= Finders keepers (English adage) =

English adage

Finders keepers, sometimes extended as the children's rhyme finders keepers, losers weepers, is an English adage with the premise that when something is unowned or abandoned, whoever finds it first may claim it for themselves to own, by the "first in time" legal standard. The phrase relates to an ancient Roman law of similar meaning and has been expressed in various ways over the centuries. It can be uncertain, however, just when or how something is unowned or abandoned, and a party other than the finder may lay claim to it, leading to legal or ethical disputes, whose findings different courts or jurisdictions may interpret differently. In one case involving two claimants, the 1982 English Court of Appeal case Parker v British Airways Board, the judgement of Donaldson L.J. declared, "Finders keepers, unless the true owner claims the article".

== Application ==
- One of the most common uses of "finders keepers" involves shipwrecks. Under international maritime law, for shipwrecks of a certain age, the original owner may have lost all claim to the cargo. Anyone who finds the wreck may then file a salvage claim on it and place a lien on the vessel, and subsequently mount a salvage operation.
- Some philosophies, such as anarcho-capitalism, that advocate a right to own land and other natural resources appeal to the doctrine of finders keepers in the case of claiming ownership of what was previously unowned (see terra nullius).
- In the United States, the Homestead Act allowed people to claim land as their own as long as it was originally unowned and was then developed by the claimant.
- In the field of social simulation, Rosaria Conte and Cristiano Castelfranchi have used "finders, keepers" as a case study for simulating the evolution of norms in simple societies.

== See also ==
- Adverse possession ("possession is nine-tenths of the law")
- Bailment
- Homestead principle
- Lost, mislaid, and abandoned property
- Theft by finding
- Usucapio/Usucaption
- Uti possidetis
