= Italian Society for the History of Physics and Astronomy =

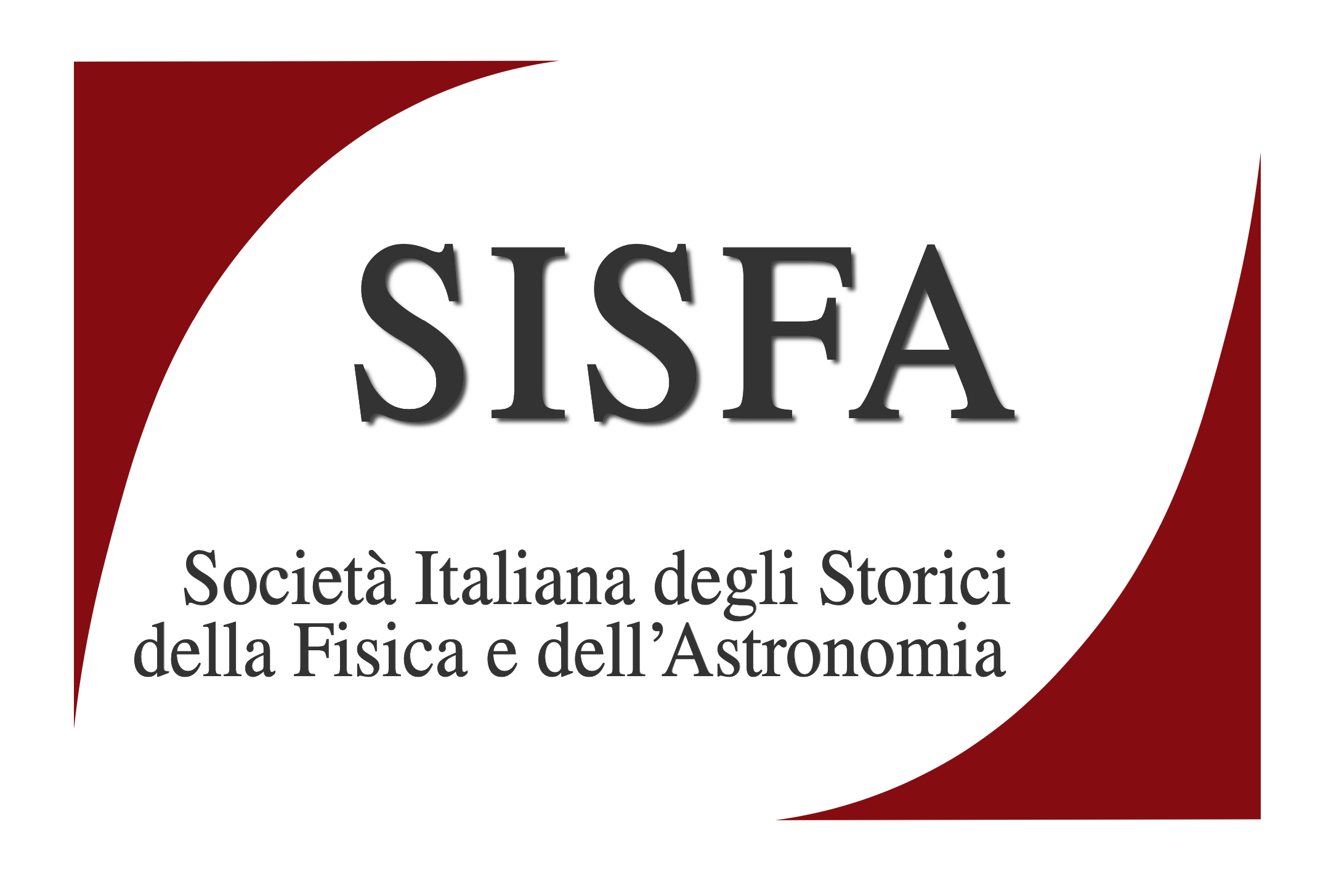
Logo of the Italian Society for the History of Physics and Astronomy

The Italian Society for the History of Physics and Astronomy (SISFA) is a scholarly association founded on 23 March 1999. Its mission is to promote historical studies in the fields of physics and astronomy as well as to strengthen the recognition of these disciplines within both academic research and education. The Society brings together scholars, researchers, teachers, and independent historians interested in the development of physical and astronomical sciences in Italy and internationally.

== Historical Background ==
SISFA's origins trace back to initiatives launched in the late 1970s, when a group of Italian researchers advocated for a coordinated national effort in the history of physics and astronomy. This movement led to the establishment in 1982, of the Gruppo Nazionale di Coordinamento per la Storia della Fisica (GNSF) within the Italian National Research Council (CNR). The group was chaired by physicist and historian Guido Tagliaferri of the University of Milan and laid the groundwork for the later foundation of SISFA.

== Aims and Activities ==
SISFA promotes a wide range of initiatives, including:

- Annual Congresses, hosted in collaboration with universities, observatories, and research institutes across Italy. These meetings gather scholars to present research, discuss methodologies, and explore new directions in the history of physics and astronomy.
- Research support, fostering collaboration among historians of science and encouraging interdisciplinary approaches.
- Publications, such as monographs, edited volumes, and the series SISFA Studies in the History of Physics and Astronomy, which includes works on the development of these disciplines in Italy.
- Outreach and education, promoting the integration of historical perspectives into school and university teaching.

== Membership ==
The Society welcomes scholars, teachers, students, and enthusiasts of the history of physics and astronomy. Members participate in the annual congress, receive updates and publications, and contribute to the advancement of historical research in the physical and astronomical sciences.

== Legacy and Impact ==
Over the decades, SISFA has played a central role in consolidating the Italian community of historians of physics and astronomy. By supporting research, organizing scientific meetings, and preserving the intellectual heritage of these disciplines, the Society contributes to a deeper understanding of the scientific traditions that shaped Italy's cultural and academic landscape.

== Awards ==
SISFA annually confers the SISFA Prize for outstanding master's theses in the history of physics or the history of astronomy. The award aims to encourage young scholars and to promote high‑quality research in these fields.
