= Vincenzo Leonio =

Italian lawyer and poet

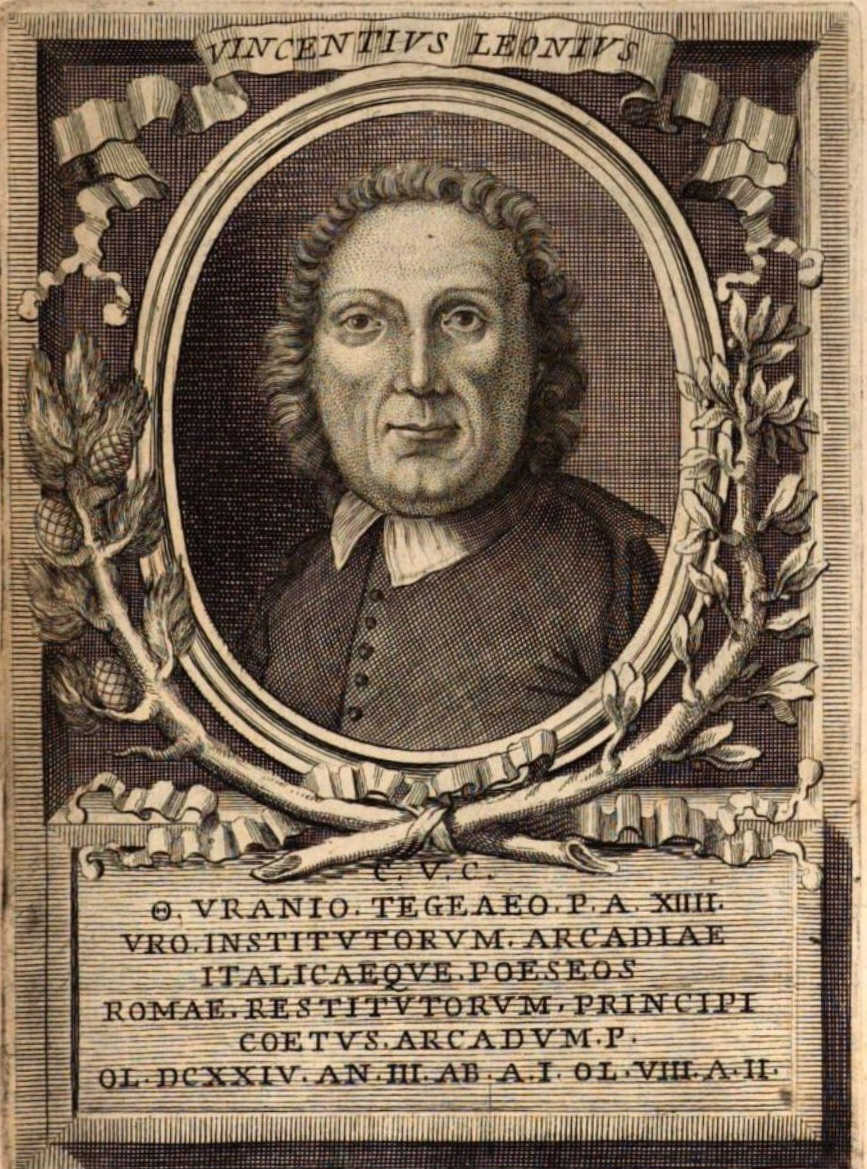
- Born: 9 February 1650; Spoleto, Papal States
- Died: 16 January 1720 (aged 69); Rome, Papal States
- Resting place: San Marcello al Corso
- Education: University of Macerata
- Occupations: Poet, lawyer
- Writing career
- Pen name: Uranio Tegeo
- Literary movement: Neoclassicism

Vincenzo Leonio (9 February 1650 – 16 January 1720) was an Italian lawyer and poet, and in 1690 was one of the original founders of the Academy of Arcadia.

== Biography ==
Vincenzo Leonio was born to an aristocratic family in Spoleto. He graduated in civil law, canon law, and theology from the University of Macerata. After practicing law in Rome for a few years, he became a writer and founder in the Accademia degli Arcadi (Academy of the Arcadians), aiming to extirpate the ruling taste and oddities introduced into the poetic language. For the academy, he took the name of Uranius Tegeaeus. A great admirer of Petrarch, Leonio wrote poetry in both Latin and Italian. Some of his elegies were included in Arcadum Carmina, Rome, 1757. His prose works are collected in the Prose degli Arcadi (Roma 1718). Some of his works were published in the second volume of Vite degli Arcadi illustri.
