= Luca Ghini =

Italian physician and botanist (1490–1556)

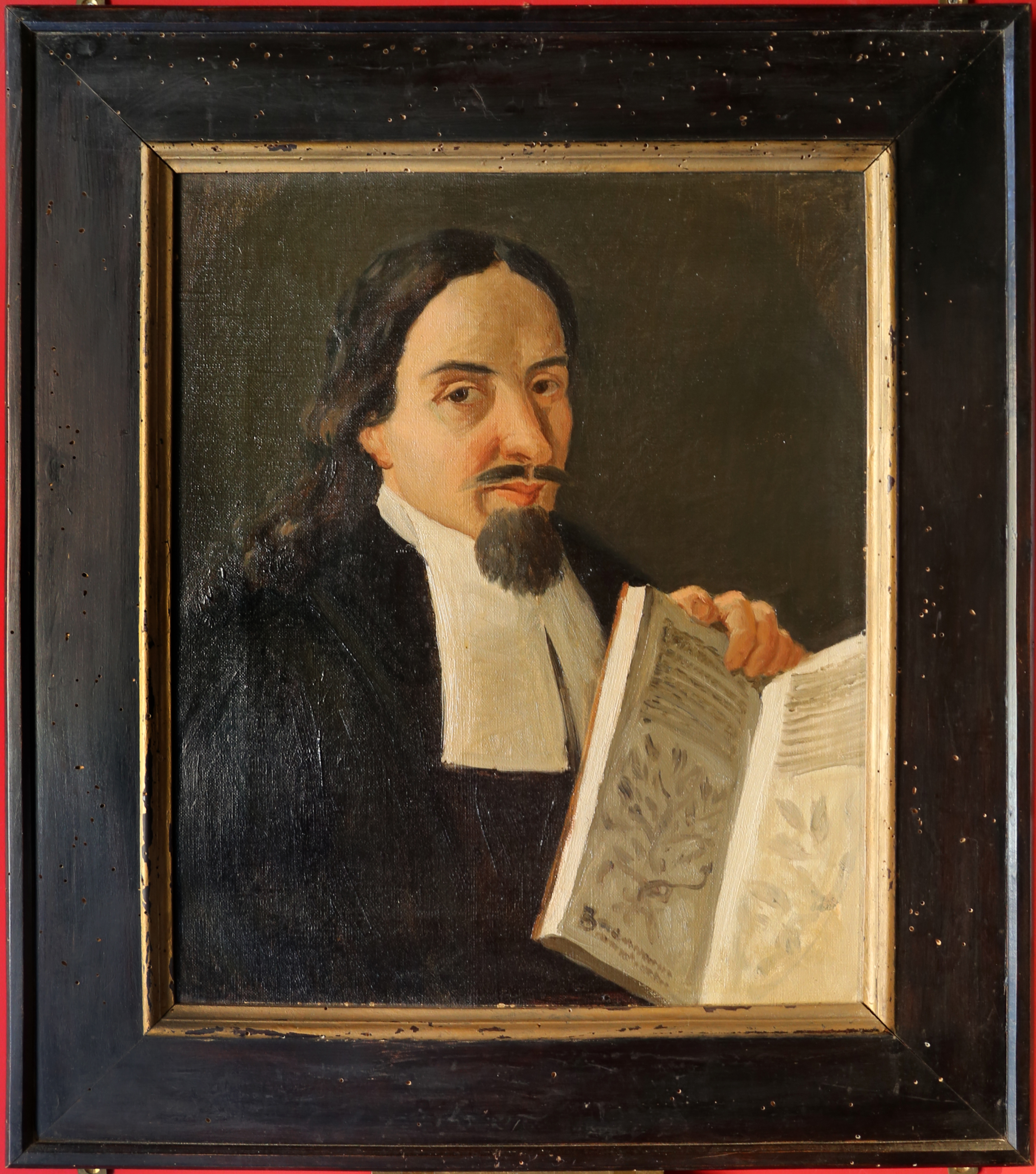
- Born: 1490; Casalfiumanese, Emilia-Romagna, Italy
- Died: 4 May 1556 (aged 65 or 66); Bologna, Italy
- Education: University of Bologna
- Known for: Creating the first herbarium
- Scientific career
- Fields: Physician and botanist
- Institutions: University of Bologna
- Notable students: Gherardo Cibo, Andrea Cesalpino, Pietro Andrea Mattioli
- Author abbrev. (botany): Ghini

Luca Ghini (Casalfiumanese, 1490 – Bologna, 4 May 1556) was an Italian physician and botanist, notable as the creator of the first recorded herbarium, as well as the first botanical garden in Europe.

== Early life and education ==
Ghini was born in Casalfiumanese, son of a notary, and studied medicine at the University of Bologna. By 1527 he was lecturing there on medicinal plants, and eventually became a professor.

== Career ==
He moved to Pisa in 1544, while maintaining his home in Bologna. He created the first herbarium (hortus siccus) in that year, drying plants while pressing them between pieces of paper, then gluing them to cardboard. None of his herbaria survived, although, the one by his student Gherardo Cibo made around 1532 survived. 1544 also saw the establishment of a garden for live plants, which became known as the Orto botanico di Pisa.

Ghini published no significant botanical work of his own, but was noted as a teacher many of whose students went on to significant careers, including Cesalpino (his successor as the director of the botanical garden) and Pietro Andrea Mattioli, the latter of which he helped by travelling around the Mediterranean and Near East in search for plants that matched the mystifying descriptions of Dioscorides. A Placiti revealing Ghini's methods was published posthumously.

== Bibliography ==
- Isely, Duane (2002). One Hundred and One Botanists. West Lafayette, Indiana: Purdue University Press. pp. 20–22. ISBN 978-1-55753-283-1. OCLC 947193619.
- Toni, G.B. de (1907). "I placiti di Luca Ghini intorno a piante descritte nei commentarii al Dioscoride di P.A. Mattioli". Memorie del Reale Istituto Veneto di Scienze, Lettere ed Arti. 27 (8): 1–49.
- Sprague, T. A.; Nelmes, E. (1 October 1931). "The Herbal of Leonhart Fuchs". Botanical Journal of the Linnean Society. 48 (325): 545–642. doi:10.1111/j.1095-8339.1931.tb00596.x.
