= McCourt =

McCourt (also rendered MacCourt, McCord, McCoard, McCard and occasionally Courtney) is an Irish surname associated with the province of Ulster. It derives from the Old Gaelic name "MacCuarta" or sometimes "MacCuairt", translating as "the son of Cuairt", a byname meaning "visitor". The name has associations with the equally Old Gaelic name of Muircheartaigh, which may be perceived through the Anglicized pronunciation of that surname as McCourt (or McCord).

McCourt is a surname of ancient origin, being first recorded in the Kingdom of Oriel, which comprised mainly the modern counties of Armagh and Monaghan, with parts of Down, Louth and Fermanagh, in the 9th century. Colla Uais, their ancestor, was King of Ireland from 322 to 326. Kinsmen of the O’Carroll Princes they were Chiefs of a considerable territory in the north of County Louth near the Armagh border. As a result of the Anglo-Norman invasions in the late 12th century, their patrimony was greatly diminished, but most remain in or near their homeland. A branch of the family who settled in County Tyrone, gave their name to the village of Cappagh (in Gaelic Ceapach Mhic Cuarta) near Dungannon in County Tyrone This is written in Gaelic as "Ceapach Mhic Cuarta", which translates as an outlying settlement of the Mac Cuarta's, one remote from the main sept.

As early as the 16th century, the surname was recorded as far south as Munster, where in several County Cork documents, it was equated with Rothe, i.e. a lease dated 1484, listed Elias Roothe alias Mc Cuarta. (viz. Muircheartaigh). Others of the "sept" are found in the Hearth Money Rolls of County Armagh for 1664, under the spelling Mac Quorte and Father Ronan, in his Irish martyrs, gives the anglicized form as Mac Worth. The name has gained a permanent place in the literary history of Ireland, due to James Mac Court or Séamas Dall Mac Cuarta [1647–1733] whose poems were collected and published by Rev. L. Murray. Known as Courtney as well as McCourt, he was a friend of Turlough O’Carolan; and he has been described as "the greatest of the northern Gaelic Poets".

== Notable people ==
- Carmel McCourt (born 1958), British singer
- Dale McCourt (born 1957), Canadian ice hockey player
- David McCourt, Irish–American entrepreneur
- E. Hansford McCourt (1909–1992), American politician
- Ellen McCourt (born 1984), English doctor and trade unionist
- Frank McCourt (1930–2009), American-Irish author
- Frank McCourt (executive) (born 1953), American businessman and sports executive
- Helen McCourt
- Hoxton Tom McCourt (born 1961), English musician
- James McCourt (writer) (born 1941), American novelist
- James McCourt (TV host), English entertainer
- Jamie McCourt (born 1953), American attorney, sports executive, and ambassador
- Jim McCourt (1944–2023), Irish boxer
- John McCourt (1874–1924), American lawyer and judge
- John McCourt (academic) (born 1965), Irish academic
- John McCourt (footballer) (1883–1948), Scottish footballer
- Kevin McCourt (businessman) (died 2000), Irish businessman
- Leah McCourt (born 1992), Irish mixed martial artist
- Malachy McCourt (1931–2024), Irish-American actor, writer, and politician
- Patrick McCourt (born 1983), Irish footballer
- Richard McCourt (born 1976), English actor and TV presenter
- Ryan McCourt (born 1975), Canadian artist
- Sean McCourt (born 1971), American actor
- Séamas Dall Mac Cuarta (c. 1647–1733), Irish poet
