= Mattioli's Dioscorides illustrated by Cibo =

16th-century illuminated herbal

Mattioli’s Dioscorides illustrated by Cibo
- British Library, Additional MS 22332
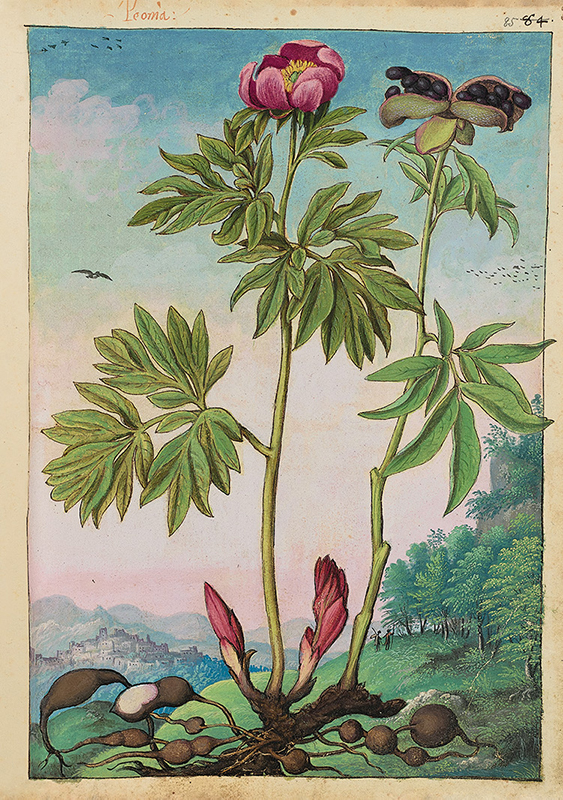
- Paeony, f. 85r
- Also known as: Discorsi by Mattioli and Cibo / Discorsi, a herbal assembled and illustrated by Gherardo Cibo
- Type: herbal
- Date: c. 1565
- Place of origin: Marche, Italy
- Language: Italian
- Author(s): Dioscorides, Pietro Andrea Mattioli, Gherardo Cibo
- Compiled by: Gherardo Cibo
- Illuminated by: Gherardo Cibo
- Material: watercolour, tempera, paper
- Size: 330 × 240 mm; 185 folios; 370 pages
- Illumination: 168 full-page illuminations

Mattioli's Dioscorides illustrated by Cibo (Discorsi by Pietro Andrea Mattioli and Gherardo Cibo) is an illuminated herbal manuscript created by the Italian artist and herbalist Gherardo Cibo in the second half of the sixteenth century. It is now kept at the British Library as Additional MS 22332, together with a related, smaller sketchbook-herbal, Additional MS 22333. Cibo’s manuscript represents a personal and original engagement with the Dioscoridean tradition, as mediated by Pietro Andrea Mattioli’s influential Discorsi, a widely circulated sixteenth-century herbal. Hand-written and hand-painted throughout, Cibo's manuscript constitutes an exceptional testimony to Italian flora, combining botanical science, first-hand observation, and landscape and botanical painting of remarkable quality. The herbal was identified as Cibo’s work in 1989 by Professor Lucia Tongiorgi Tomasi.

== Historical context ==
Pietro Andrea Mattioli (1501–1577) was the most influential Renaissance interpreter of Dioscorides, whose commentaries shaped European botany and pharmacology. His magnum opus, first published in Italian as Discorsi and later in Latin as Commentarii on Dioscorides’ treatise De materia medica, included not only Mattioli’s translation but also his own ample commentary as well as new material, namely plant species not described by Dioscorides. The work was translated into several European languages and continuously revised and new editions published throughout Mattioli’s lifetime. Later editions were particularly successful, renowned for their woodcut illustrations of plants.

Gherardo Cibo (1512–1600), a nobleman from the Marche, operated within this Mattiolian framework. A cultivated dilettante rather than a professional botanist or artist, Cibo was nonetheless highly accomplished. He was known for colouring his own copies of printed herbals, for undertaking similar commissions for others (including the Duke of Urbino), and especially for producing original botanical and landscape paintings and drawings of outstanding quality.

The relationship between Mattioli and Cibo is documented by a letter sent by Mattioli from Prague in 1565, in which he praised Cibo’s plant paintings as unequalled, thanked him for sending botanical images, and presented him with a newly published edition of his commentary on Dioscorides. This letter was later pasted onto the inside cover of Additional MS 22333. Mattioli also publicly praised Cibo’s artistic skill in the 1568 edition of his work.

== Manuscript content ==
Additional MS 22332 is Cibo’s personal herbal. It consists of excerpts from Mattioli’s Discorsi—primarily concerning plants native to the Marche region where Cibo lived—combined with Cibo’s own annotations, corrections, and observations. Most notably, the manuscript is illustrated with 165 original full-page botanical illustrations. The miniatures are placed on the recto of folios, with plant names and descriptive texts typically written on the facing page. These texts include morphological notes, medicinal, veterinary, culinary, and aesthetic uses, and information on habitats and places of collection. Many descriptions explicitly derive from Mattioli’s Discorsi, but they are expanded through Cibo’s personal experience. He often recorded precise collection sites, dates, and companions, grounding his work in field observation. Corrections and marginal additions reveal an evolving and self-critical working process.

The most distinctive aspect of Cibo’s illustrated Dioscorides is the placement of plants within charming landscape settings. Unlike conventional herbals, in which the plant is isolated against a blank ground, Cibo situates each specimen within a detailed environmental and narrative context that often accurately reflects its natural habitat. These landscapes—sometimes realistic, sometimes imaginary—include mountains, rivers, castles, ruins, ports, villages, fields, and coastlines, often inspired by the Marche region, the Apennines, and the Adriatic coastline. The plant species themselves are depicted with great botanical accuracy, emphasising their distinctive characteristics while maintaining a refined artistic sensibility that complements the pastoral or Arcadian atmosphere of their surroundings.

The manuscript was compiled over several years from the 1560s onward. Crossed-out passages and later additions testify to continual revision, in keeping with the empirical spirit promoted by Renaissance botany. As such, the manuscript constitutes an important document in the history of early modern botany, particularly as practiced outside academic and courtly institutions.

== Gallery ==
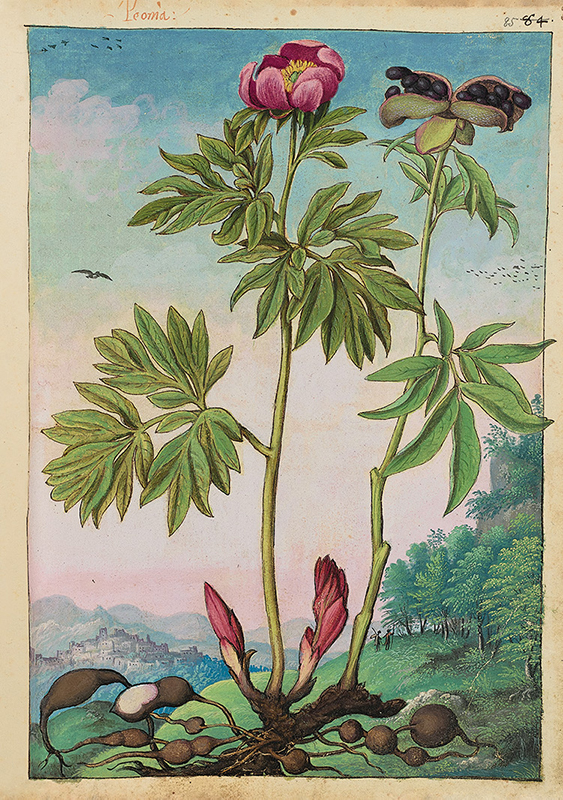
Paeony (Paeonia offcinalis), f. 85r

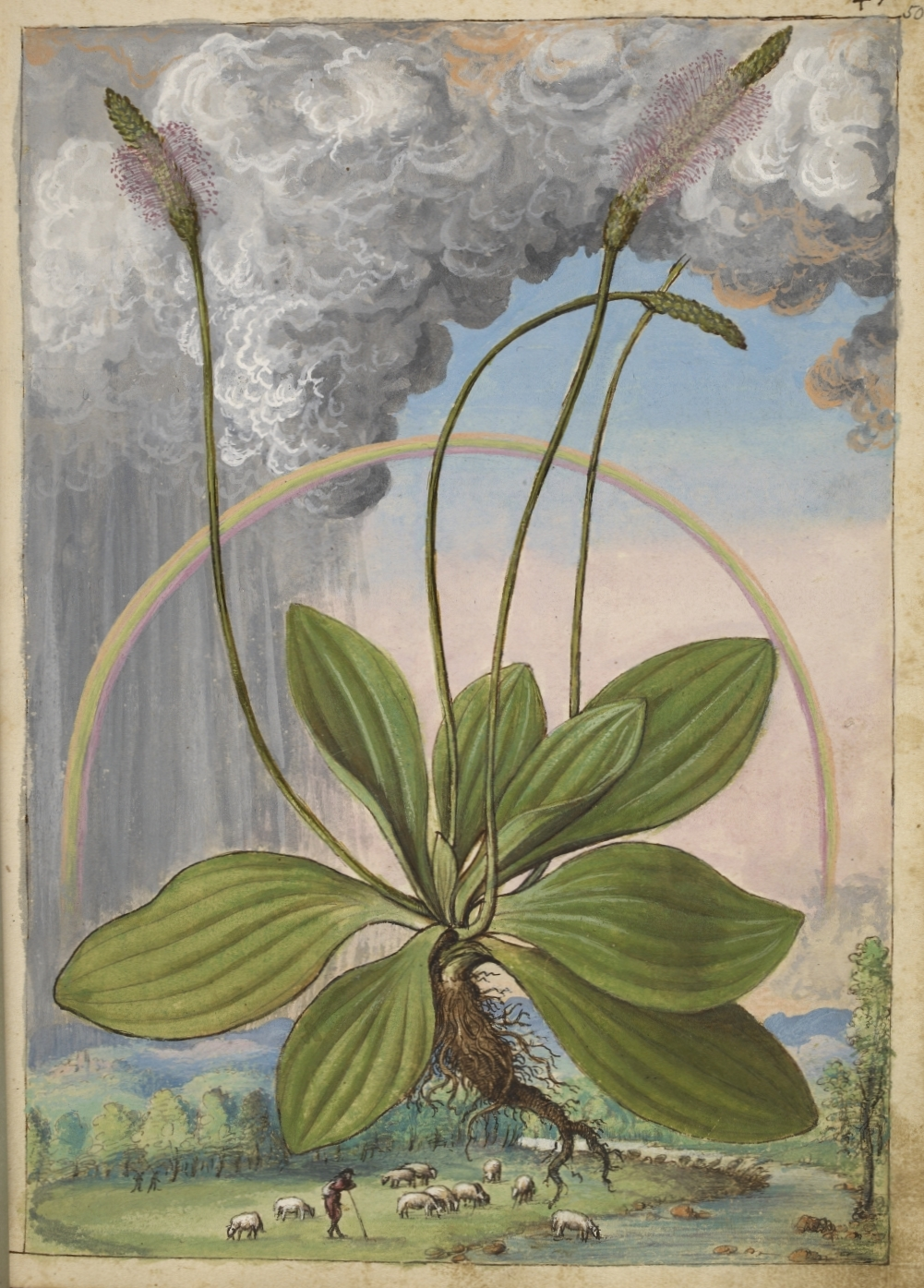
Hoary plantain (Plantago media L.), f. 50r

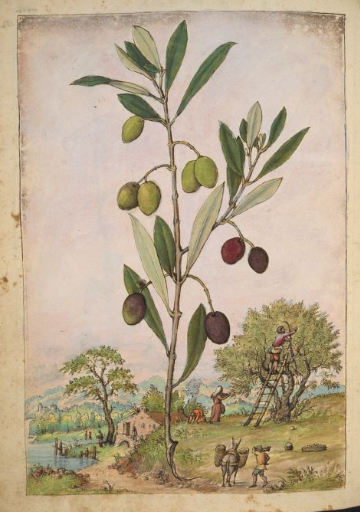
Olive tree (Olea europaea L.), f. 181v
