= Cinzia Verde =

Biochemist

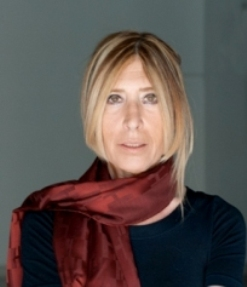
- Education: University of Naples
- Scientific career
- Fields: Polar Biology
- Workplaces: Consiglio Nazionale delle Ricerche
- Website: ibbr.cnr.it/ibbr/people/vincenza-verde

Cinzia Verde is an Italian researcher in marine biochemistry at the National Research Council (CNR), Institute of Biosciences and BioResources (IBBR).

== Early life and education ==
Verde received her Degree (equivalent to a PhD) in Biological Sciences cum laude from the University of Naples in 1987.

== Career and impact ==
Verde is a Senior Researcher at the National Research Council (CNR), Institute of Biosciences and BioResources (IBBR) as a marine biochemist leading the CNR research area “Polar Biology”. She is Managing Editor of the Journal Marine Genomics and a member of the Editorial Board of Biodiversity.

Verde researches the biological processes and evolution of prokaryotes and eukaryotes from polar ecosystems. Her work particularly focuses on these organisms’ adaptation to their extreme environments and vulnerability to changing climate. Besides her scientific papers, Verde has participated in many book chapters and international and national lectures. Verde also set up a Polar Aquarium in Naples, the first polar aquarium in Italy, under the direction of the CNR and the National Programme for Antarctic Research (PNRA).

Verde advises polar policy through SCAR and ESF steering committees. She is a Member of the Planning, Advisory and Scientific Group of the SCAR programme Antarctic Ecosystem: Adaptation, Thresholds and Resilience (AnT-ERA) as a lead investigator with a project called “Marine organisms in cold environments: Biochemical adaptations and biotechnological applications”. Verde co-authored the 2009 SCAR Report on Antarctic Climate Change and the Environment and contributed to the ESF position paper on “Ocean and Polar Life and Environmental Sciences on a Warming Planet”.

== Awards and honors ==
Verde was awarded as Influential Female Antarctic Researcher by the Scientific Committee on Antarctic Research (SCAR).

== Selected works ==
- Verde, Cinzia; Carratore, Vito; Riccio, Antonio; Tamburrini, Maurizio; Parisi, Elio; di Prisco, Guido (2002) The functionally distinct hemoglobins of the Arctic spotted wolffish Anarhichas minor Journal of Biological Chemistry 277(39):36312-36320
- Mazzarella, Lelio; Vergara, Alessandro; Vitagliano, Luigi; Merlino, Antonello; Bonomi, Giovanna; Scala, Sonia; Verde, Cinzia; Di Prisco, Guido (2006) High resolution crystal structure of deoxy hemoglobin from Trematomus bernacchii at different pH values: the role of histidine residues in modulating the strength of the root effect,"Proteins: Structure, Function, and Bioinformatics 65(2):490-498
- Mazzarella, Lelio; Bonomi, Giovanna; Lubrano, Maria C; Merlino, Antonello; Riccio, Antonio; Vergara, Alessandro; Vitagliano, Luigi; Verde, Cinzia; di Prisco, Guido (2006) Minimal structural requirements for Root effect: crystal structure of the cathodic hemoglobin isolated from the Antarctic fish Trematomus newnesi Proteins: Structure, Function, and Bioinformatics 62(2):316-321
