= University of Bari =

University in Apulia, Italy

Coordinates: 41°07′13″N 16°52′06″E

University of Bari Aldo Moro
- Università degli Studi di Bari Aldo Moro
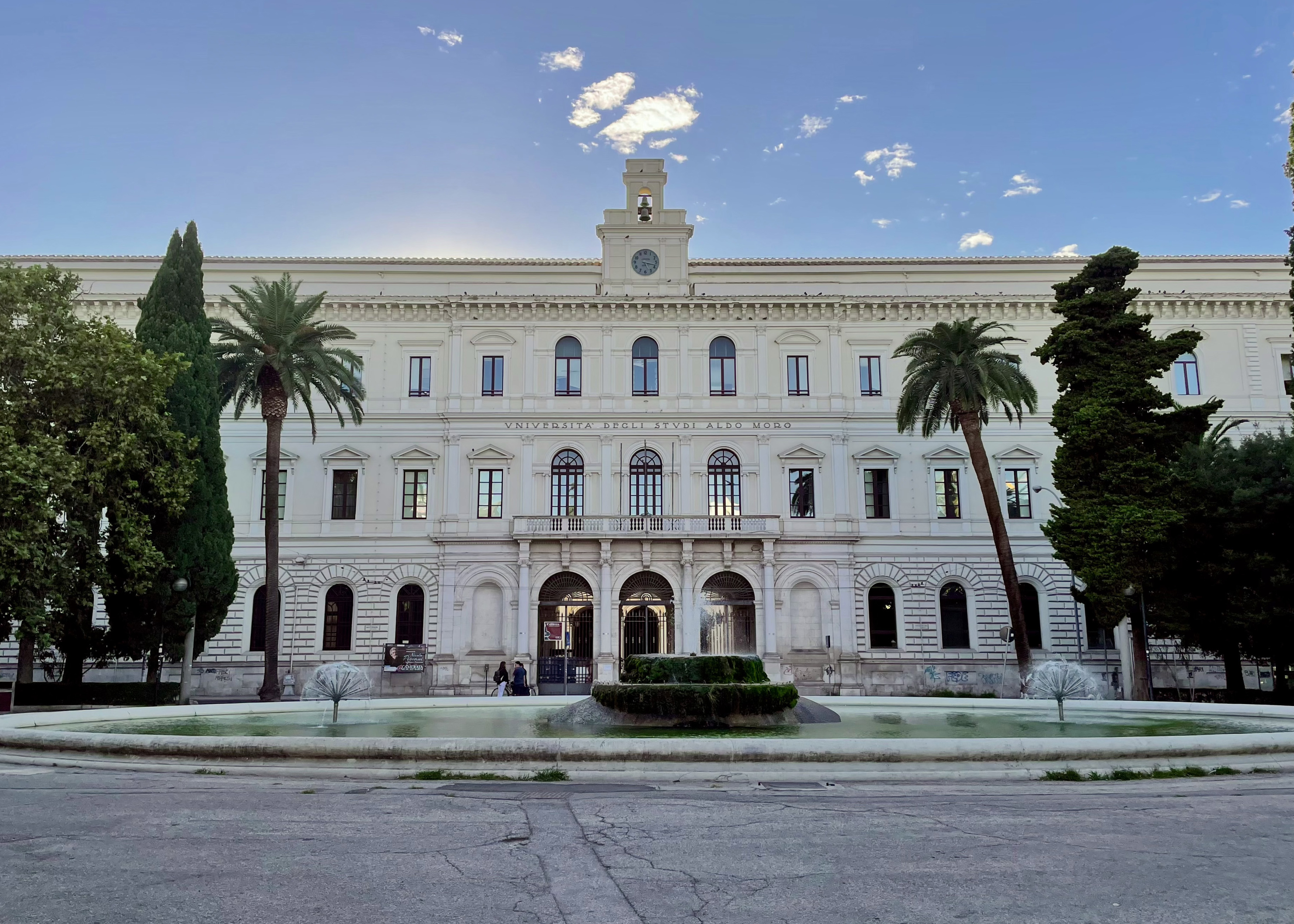
- University of Bari Aldo Moro campus
- Latin: Universitatis Barensis
- Motto: Et lucem sed aliam reddit
- Type: Public
- Established: 1925
- Rector: Roberto Bellotti
- Students: 49,000
- Location: Bari; Taranto; Brindisi, Italy
- Campus: Urban
- Sports teams: CUS Bari
- Affiliations: UNIMED, GUIDE
- Website: www.uniba.it

The University of Bari Aldo Moro (Italian: Università degli Studi di Bari Aldo Moro) is a public higher education institution founded in 1925 in Bari, Apulia in Southern Italy. The university has a student population of around 40,000.

On 15 January 2010, the university changed its name to honour the statesman and prime minister Aldo Moro (1916–1978), a student of law there until 1939 who then served as ordinary professor of philosophy of Law and Colonial Policy (1941) and of Criminal Law (1942). He was Prime Minister of Italy for five terms in the 60s and 70s.

== Organization ==
The University of Bari is divided into various faculties. Each faculty has its own set of departments that focus on the arts and sciences, mathematics, social sciences, literature, medicine, law, and education. These are the 13 faculties in which the university is divided into:

- Faculty of Agricultural Science
- Faculty of Arts and Philosophy
- Faculty of Biotechnological Sciences
- Faculty of Communication Studies
- Faculty of Economics
- Faculty of Educational Science
- Faculty of Foreign Languages and Literature
- Faculty of Law
- Faculty of Mathematics, Physics and Natural Science
- Faculty of Medicine and Surgery
- Faculty of Pharmacy
- Faculty of Political Science
- Faculty of Veterinary Medicine
- Ionian Department of Law and Economics (Taranto)

The university offers various courses for undergraduate, graduate and post-graduate students. Aside from teaching, the university is also focused on scientific research at the doctorate level. The University of Bari research centres are highly-interactive, having connections among different departments, universities, and other research centres.

== Rankings ==
The university has been awarded the following ranking positions:

- ranked 359th by the Center for World University Rankings (CWUR, 2016)
- ranked 437th by the CWTS Leiden Ranking (2016)
- ranked 401–500th, Times Higher Education (THE) World University Ranking (2016)
- ranked over 500th by Academic Ranking of World Universities (ARWU, 2017)
- ranked over 700th by QS World University Rankings (2016)

The university is one of the 48 Italian higher education institutions in the CWUR list of the top 1000 universities in the world for 2016. Moreover, it was ranked between 151st and 200th in the world for Physics by ARWU – Shanghai Jiao Tong University in 2015.

== Points of interest ==
- Orto Botanico dell'Università di Bari

== See also ==
- List of universities in Italy
- Institute for Chemical-Physical Processes
