= University of Messina =

Public university in Messina, Italy

Coordinates: 38.2310°N 15.5539°E

- Università degli Studi di Messina
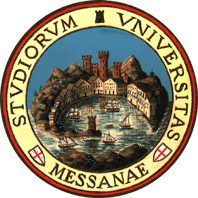
- Seal of UNIME
- Latin: Universitas Studiorum Messanae
- Motto: Tradition and change, at the centre of the Mediterranean
- Type: Public
- Established: 1548; 478 years ago
- Affiliations: UNIMED
- Rector: Giovanna Spatari
- Students: 23,779 (2018/2019)
- Location: Messina, Italy
- Campus: Polo Centrale Policlinico G. Martino Polo Annunziata Polo Papardo
- Sport Centre: CUS Messina
- Website: international.unime.it

The University of Messina (Italian: Università degli Studi di Messina; Latin: Studiorum Universitas Messanae), known colloquially as UniME, is a state university located in Messina, Sicily, Italy. Founded in 1548 by Pope Paul III, it was the world's first Jesuit college, and today it is counted among the oldest universities in Italy.

It is organized in 12 departments offering more than 80 Graduate and Undergraduate Degrees, over 20 Master's Degrees and 13 PhD Programmes. Among them, 7 are English-taught. The University counts more than 23.000 students distributed in the four campus facilities spread across the city.

Over the centuries the University of Messina has been a centre of attraction for esteemed scholars and historical figures, such as Giovanni Pascoli, Marcello Malpighi, Gaetano Salvemini and Vittorio Emanuele Orlando.

== Organization ==
The university comprises 12 departments:

- Department of Ancient and Modern Civilizations
- Department of Economics
- Department of Law
- Department of Engineering
- Department of Clinical and Experimental Medicine
- Department of Adult and Childhood Human Pathology “Gaetano Barresi”
- Department of Biomedical, Dental, Morphological and Functional Imaging Sciences
- Department of Chemical, Biological, Pharmaceutical and Environmental Sciences
- Department of Cognitive Science, Education and Cultural Studies
- Department of Mathematical and Computer Science, Physical Sciences and Earth Sciences
- Department of Political and Juridical Sciences
- Department of Veterinary Sciences

== Campuses ==
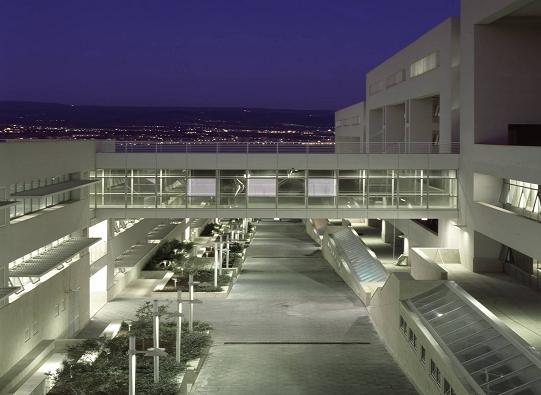
Department of Engineering, Polo Papardo

The University occupies four main sites in Messina:

University rankings

Global – Overall
- QS World: 741-750 (2026)

The Central Administration Buildings and the Faculties of Economics, Political Science, Law and Education are located in the centre of Messina in the historical site of the University or Polo Centrale.

The Faculty of Medicine is held in the main hospital of the city, Policlinico G. Martino, situated in the southern area of Messina.

The Faculties of Sciences and Engineering are located inside Polo Papardo, overlooking the famous Strait of Messina.

The Faculties of Veterinary Medicine, Pharmacy and Humanities are established in the Polo Annunziata facility, which is also the Sport Centre of the University.

== History ==
The Studiorum Universitas was formally established by Pope Paul III in November 1548, although the city of the Strait boasts an ancient cultural tradition as well as a teaching tradition connected to a Law school in the late 13th century and a well-known Ancient Languages school in the 15th century.

However, the regular working activity of the Athenaeum was paralysed by disputes with the Jesuits, in order to prevent them from monopolizing the Universities of the whole island.

The University began its activities only in 1596. It was the beginning of a short but intense existence which ended in 1678, when the Athenaeum was closed as a result of the anti-Spanish insurrection. During these years the University of Messina represented a strong political and cultural influence. It reached high levels, featuring top professors including Giovanni Alfonso Borelli, Pietro Castelli, Giovan Battista Cortesi, Carlo Fracassati, Giacomo Gallo, Mario Giurba, Marcello Malpighi and Francesco Maurolico.

The Athenaeum was refinanced in 1838 by King Ferdinando II, but it was closed again in 1847 because of an Anti-Bourbon Revolt and reopened only 2 years later.

After these years the University included numerous prominent lecturers such as Pietro Bonfante, Leonardo Coviello, Vittorio Martinetti, Vittorio Emanuele Orlando, Giovanni Pascoli and Gaetano Salvemini.

In 1908 an earthquake destroyed the city of Messina. Fourteen lecturers died under the ruins, while the majority of libraries and scientific facilities were destroyed. The University reopened in October 1909 starting with the Faculty of Law.

During the years 1914-1915, the Faculty of Sciences, Pharmacy and Medicine reopened among outstanding difficulties.

Between 1919 and 1920 all the courses of the Faculty of Medicine were carried out thanks to the local institutions, which approved the establishment of a consortium managing the Civil Hospital where clinics had a temporary location.

In the same year, the University of Messina proved the recovery of its dynamism by regaining the title of Athenaeum of the Strait.

Year by year, the Athenaeum strengthened its buildings and was playing a major role in cultural events of the country, overcoming also the difficult period of reconstruction after World War II, thanks to the Rectors Gaetano Martino and Salvatore Pugliatti.

== Points of interest ==
- Orto Botanico "Pietro Castelli" dell'Università di Messina

== See also ==
- Cirsdig
- List of early modern universities in Europe
- List of Italian universities
- Messina
- Institute for Chemical-Physical Processes
