= Francesco Dieli =

Francesco Dieli (born May 23, 1958) is an Italian immunologist. He was born in Prizzi, Italy. After high school education, in 1983 he got his degree with honors in medicine at the University of Palermo, where he specialized in pathology. He got his PhD in immunology in 1999. He is full professor of immunology and director of the Division of Immunology and Immunogenetics at the University of Palermo, Italy.

Dieli’s research has covered several aspects of human immunology: delayed-type hypersensitivity responses, immune response against Mycobacterium tuberculosis and cancer immunotherapy. Dieli has been involved in over 150 publications and is the author of 2 patents. Dieli was awarded the Albanese prize in 1983 and the Lauro Chiazzese prize in 1984. He is an honorary member of the National Academy of Sciences since 2001 and an honorary member of the Academy of Medical Sciences since 2002. Dieli is a founding member of the biopharmaceutical company TetraPharm s.r.l. and dean of the International PhD programme in Immunopharmacology at the University of Palermo.

Professional societies • Italian Society of Pathology (1984–present) • Member of the Council of the Italian Society of Pathology (2010–present) • Italian Society of Immunology (1985–1989) • British Society for Immunology (1990–present) • American Association of Immunologists (2007–present) • Federation of the American Societies for Experimental Biology (2007–present)

Editorial boards • PLoS ONE • Frontiers in Mucosal Immunity • The Open Autoimmunity Journal • The Open Biomarkers Journal • Recent Patents in Biomarkers • The World Journal of Stem Cells

Peer reviewing • Ad hoc reviewer for several journals, including: Science, Nature Medicine, Immunity, Journal of Experimental Medicine, Blood, Journal of Immunology, European Journal of Immunology, Immunology, Clinical and Experimental Immunology, Journal of Leukocyte Biology, PLoS Medicine, PLoS ONE, Molecular Medicine, Clinical Cancer Research, British Journal of Cancer, Cancer Research, Journal of Infectious Diseases, and Infection and Immunity. • Ad hoc reviewer for several grants agencies, including: Wellcome Trust, European Commission, Medical Research Council of UK, Funding for Scientific Research of Belgium, National Research Agency of France, National Cancer Institute of France, Eli and Edythe Broad Foundation for Scientific and Medical Research of USA, Health Research Board of Ireland, Italian Ministry of Universities and Research, Italian Ministry of Health, Italian National Institute of Health, Italian-German University.

Appointments • National Research Council of Italy (CNR), SAB member. Kuwait University, Promotion Committee member. University of Palermo Incubator, SAB member. “Piera Cutino” Foundation for Research, SAB Chairman. UNESCO International Centre for AIDS and Emerging and Re-emerging Infections, member. Tuberculosis Vaccine Initiative (TBVI), member. UNICEF/UNDP/World Bank/ WHO Special Programme for Research and Training in Tropical Diseases (TDR), member.
