= CIRSDIG =

The Inter-University Centre for Research on the Sociology of Law, Information and Legal Institutions (CIRSDIG) is a network created in 1988 by the Universities of Messina and Macerata in Italy.

== Aims ==
The center's stated aims are:

1. to develop research activities in the sociology of law and studies on legal institutions, with particular focus on the aspects of communication and information law;
2. to implement Ph.D. courses, awards, and scholarships (CIRSDIG is one of the promoting institutions of the Ph.D. courses on "Analysis and Theory of Political Institutions, Social and Communicative Changes" at the University of Messina, "Sociology of Legal and Political Institutions and Analysis of Administrative processes" and "Theory of Information and Communication" at the University of Macerata);
3. to promote the exchange of information among scholars in a framework of cooperation with public and private institutions;
4. to stimulate interdisciplinary approaches.

== Projects ==
Over the years, CIRSDIG has carried out a number of scientific research projects, published a series of working papers, and organized several events, based around the empirical research conducted by the centre's scholars into law and communicative processes. The Centre has also developed studies on journalism and communication. Fields of research at the Center include the "journalistic construction of electoral campaigns", deviance, youth, and immigration. Recently, the Centre has produced a study in the field of education, "The Normative Impact of Legislation on Schooling and Education in Calabria", financed by the Local Government of Calabria.

== Other roles ==
Apart from the research activities, CIRSDIG organizes seminars, conferences, and other similar events. In May 2001, an international conference on the new communicative and social codes was held at the University of Messina. Participants included Michel Maffesoli, Eric Landowski, Oscar Correas, and Roque Carrion-Wam. Presented papers were later published in two books. The Center also organised a conference on "Youth, Values and Liquid Society" in Messina in 2004, with participants from other Italian universities including Mario Morcellini, Valerio Pocar, Antonio La Spina, and Domenico Carzo.

In 2006, CIRSDIG carried out a research project on the subject of usury and organized crime in Messina, which received coverage in the national press. Today, the Centre is focused principally on social change in Southern Italian society, which includes new studies on New Media, multiculturalism, and social protections.

In May 2006, CIRSDIG began a new empirical study on "Cultural Consumption and Social Imaginaries: Gender Perspectives".
