= University of Macerata =

Public university in Italy

Coordinates: 43°17′59″N 13°27′13″E

- Università degli Studi di Macerata
- Type: Public
- Established: 1290; 736 years ago
- Affiliations: Macerata Student Network
- Rector: John Francis McCourt
- Students: 11,213 (2008)
- Location: Macerata, Italy
- Sports teams: Cus Macerata
- Website: www.unimc.it

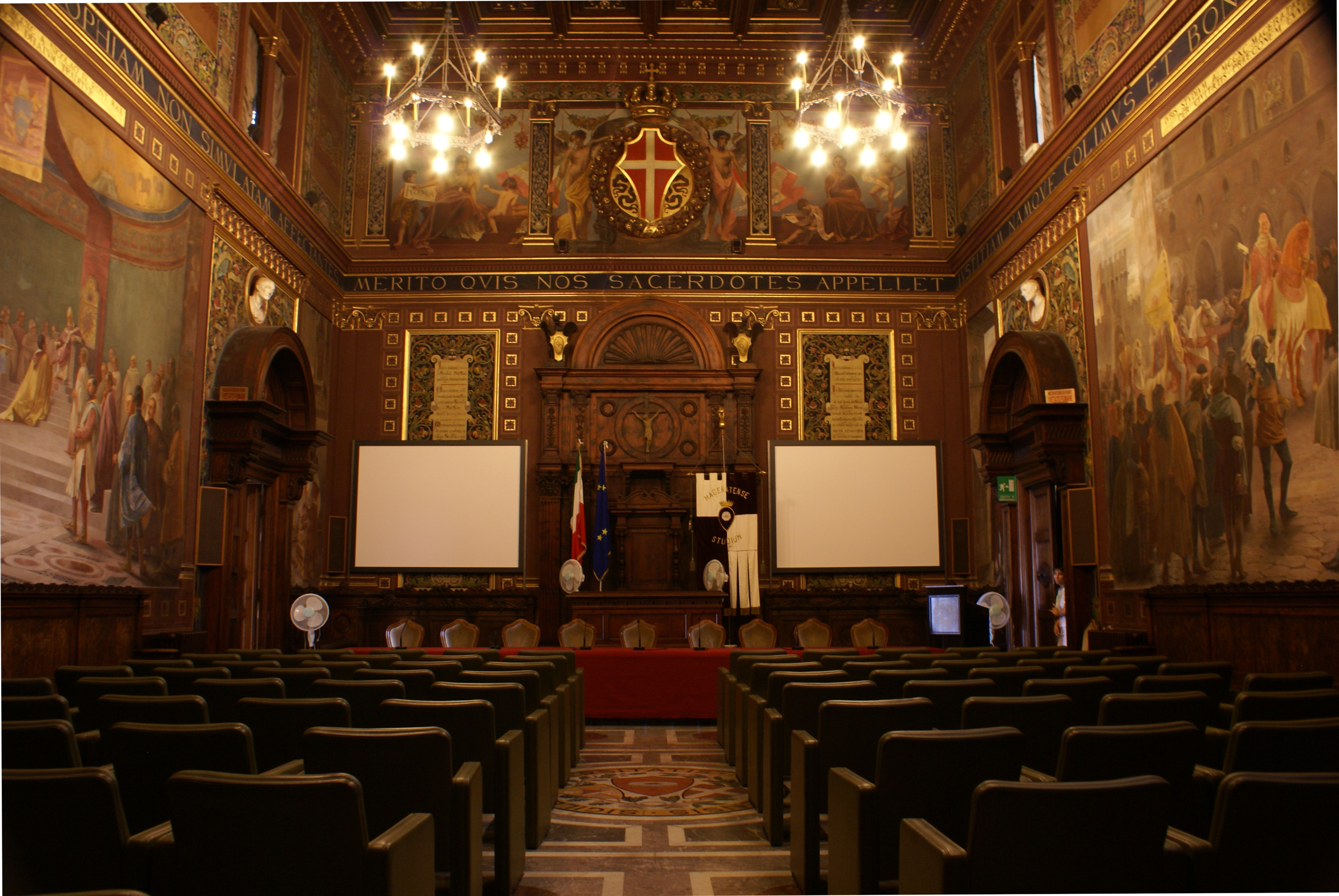
The grand hall of the University

The University of Macerata (Italian: Università degli Studi di Macerata) is a public university located in Macerata, Italy. Founded in 1290, it is one of the oldest universities in Europe still in operation. It is the only university in Italy to focus entirely on the humanities and the social sciences.

== History ==
The university was established as a school of law by the commune of Macerata in September of 1290 through Pope Nicholas IV, a native of nearby Ascoli Piceno, making it one of the oldest universities in Italy. Although not a Studium generale able to grant doctoral degrees, the school functioned as a public institution at a time when most law schools were private, leading most scholars to use 1290 as the traditional founding date.

On May 28, 1518, Pope Leo X authorized the college to confer doctoral degrees. Bishop Pietro Flores had made the request so that poor young men in the region, who could not afford to attend distant doctoral institutions, could attain higher education within the Marche.

The university began to grow in size after being formally recognized with a papal bull issued by Pope Paul III in 1540. It became the fourth university of the Papal States after the University of Bologna, on which it was closely modeled in organization, the Sapienza University of Rome, and the University of Perugia. It functioned as a center of learning in the Marche region.

For much of its history, the university was dominated by the study of law. Matriculation and remuneration records between 1527 and 1800 indicate that 4,889 doctorates were awarded and that the majority of faculty and students were born in central and northern Italy. The university awarded a large number of theology doctorates despite never having more than one theologian, likely because the Franciscan and Dominican Orders had instituted houses of study at the college. Analysis of publications in the period show that scholars at Macerata were mainly obscure and regional, with a small number of influential faculty.

Notable professors at the university include the philosopher Jacopo Mazzoni, the Scottish historian Archibald Bower, Cardinal Mario Marefoschi, playwright Sforza degli Oddi, and theologians Bernardino Ciaffoni and Giovanni Mario Crescimbeni.

The university operated continuously from 1290 until a closure from 1831 to 1849 during the political unrest of the Risorgimento. It was reopened in 1850 and became a royal university in 1860 under the Casati Law following the Marche's annexation into the Kingdom of Italy.

== Present day ==
The various departments and offices of the university are located within the medieval walls of the old center of Macerata. The average age of professors at the university is 40.

The university enrolls 13,000 students and employs 300 academics and 300 administrators. The Giacomo Leopardi School of Advanced Studies offers multidisciplinary teaching programs, and the Confucius Institute, established in 2011, promotes Chinese language and culture and Italy-China ties. Some of the seven faculties at the university offer courses entirely in English.

The current rector is John McCourt, elected in 2022 for a six-year term, and the first non-Italian to hold the position at an Italian university.

== Organization ==
These are the 5 departments in which the university is divided into:

- Department of Economics and Law
- Department of Law
- Department of Education, Cultural Heritage and Tourism
- Department of Political Science, Communication and International Relations
- Department of Humanities – Languages, Language Liaison, History, Arts, Philosophy

== Notable alumni ==
Are the following

- Giovanni Allevi, Italian composer and pianist
- Valeria Mancinelli, first female mayor of Ancona
- Maurizio Martina, UN director
- Ada Natali, first woman mayor in Italy
- Pier Matteo Petrucci, 18th-century cardinal
- Gaspare Bernardo Pianetti, 19th-century vice-governor of Rome
- Paolo Sirena, footballer
- Iginio Straffi, animator
- Fernando Tambroni, Italian prime minister

== See also ==
- Cirsdig
- List of early modern universities in Europe
- List of Italian universities
- Macerata

== Literature ==
- Roberto Sani, Sandro Serangeli Per un'introduzione alla storia dell'Universita' di Macerata // Annali di Storia delle Università italiane - Volume 13 (2009)
