= Pietro Castelli =

Italian physician and botanist (1574–1662)

- Born: 1574; Rome, Papal States
- Died: 1661 (aged 86–87); Messina, Kingdom of Sicily
- Education: Sapienza University of Rome
- Known for: Messina botanical garden
- Scientific career
- Fields: Medicine; Botany
- Workplaces: Sapienza University of Rome; University of Messina
- Academic advisors: Andrea Cesalpino

Pietro Castelli (1574–1661) was an Italian physician and botanist.

== Biography ==
Born in Rome in 1574, Castelli studied medicine under Andrea Cesalpino at the Sapienza University of Rome, graduating in 1594. He succeeded Giovanni Faber as a professor of medicine in Rome and as keeper of the Vatican gardens. Castelli taught in Rome until 1634, when he relocated to the University of Messina. In 1638, he founded the Messina botanical garden, where he cultivated many exotic medicinal plants and trained promising young naturalists such as Paolo Boccone, Francesco Cupani and Agostino Scilla. To expand the garden's collections, he made use of his personal connections. Through extensive correspondence, he obtained materials from a variety of countries across Europe, Africa and the Americas. Those who assisted him in this endeavour included Marco Aurelio Severino from Naples, Johann Vesling from Padua and Ole Worm from Denmark. The garden included also a museum of anatomy and natural history and a chemistry laboratory.

In his Hortus Messanensis (Messina, 1640), Castelli provides a precise and detailed account of the plant species cultivated in Messina's garden. What was originally intended as a simple register to share with friends and fellow botanists grew significantly to become the most important work in his extensive body of writing.

Castelli was equally distinguished as a botanist, chemist, and surgeon. He maintained the necessity for all physicians of studying anatomy, and declared in 1648 that he had dissected more than one hundred corpses. His growing scientific reputation attracted a number of prominent European naturalists to Messina, including the Dane Thomas Bartholin and the Englishmen Francis Willughby, John Ray and Philip Skippon. Bartholin, who visited Castelli in Messina, in 1644, speaks highly of his work as a botanist. During Bartholin's time in Sicily, the two naturalists travelled to Mount Etna to study its flora. Their findings and observations were detailed and preserved across various scientific letters from that period.

Castelli wrote no less than one hundred and fifty pamphlets. Among these there is one written in 1653 in answer to inquiries by Girolamo Bardi of Genoa, wherein Castelli speaks of the cinchona plant and its curative properties in cases of malaria. Castelli appears to have had little knowledge of cinchona and no experience of its medicinal use. Nevertheless, the pamphlet is noteworthy as one of the earliest publications to mention cinchona.

Castelli died at Messina in 1661. After his death, Messina's botanical garden came under the care of Marcello Malpighi and his pupil, Carlo Fracassati. The garden was destroyed by the Spanish army, along with the rest of the university, during the repression of the Messina revolt in 1678.

== Works ==
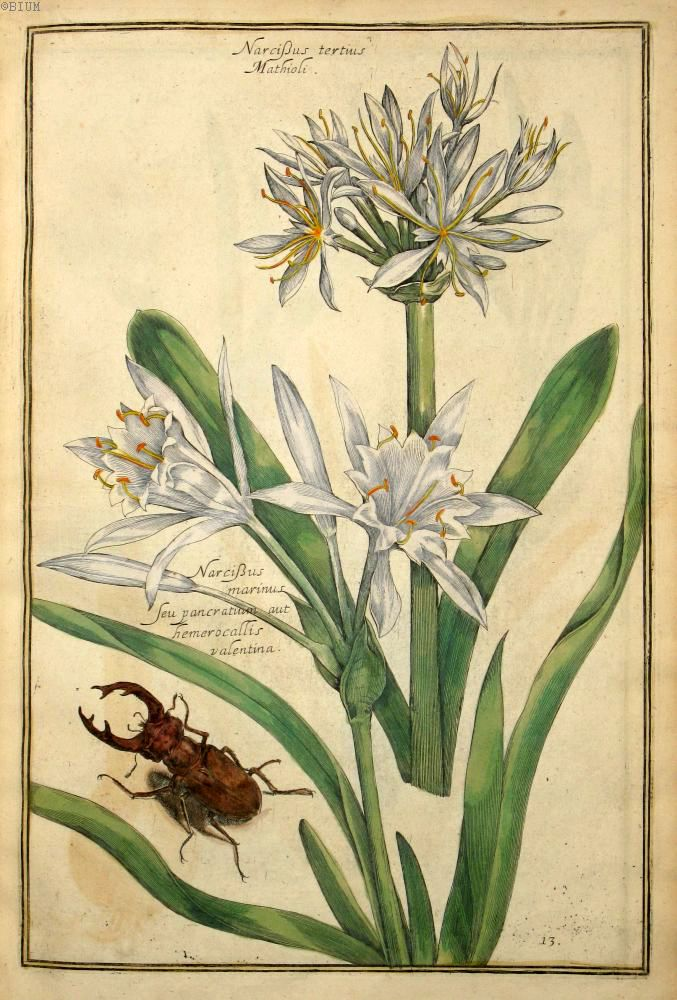
Narcissus tertius Mathioli - Narcissus marinus: Paris : Petrum Firens Date of publication : 1627 Theatrum Florae, in quo ex toto orbe selecti mirabiles, venustiores ac praecipui flores, tanquam ab ipsius Deae sinu, proferuntur by Pietro Castelli and Daniel Rabel

- Chalcanthinum dodechaporion, sive Duodecim dubitationes in usu olei vitrioli et defensio antiquorum in arsenici atque sandarachae potu (Rome, Mascardi, 1619).
- Breve Ricordo dell'ellettione, qualità et virtù dello spirito et oglio acido di vitriolo (Rome, Mascardi, 1621).
- Discorso della duratione de' medicamenti tanto semplici quanto compositi (Rome, Mascardi, 1621).
- Epistola Petri Castelli,... ad condiscipulos suos Joannem Manelphum et Aetium Cletum,... in qua agitur, nomine hellebori simpliciter prolato, tum apud Hippocratem, tum alios auctores, intelligendum album et ab hoc purgatas a Melampode Proeti regis Argivorum furentes filias atque ab Anticyreo sanatum Herculem insanientem (Rome, Mascardi, 1622).
- Epistola secunda de helleboro Petri Castelli,... in qua confirmantur ea quae in alia Epistola de helleboro allata fuere (Rome, Mascardi, 1622).
- Exactissima descriptio rariorum quarundam plantarum, quae continentur Romae in Horto Farnesiano (Rome, Mascardi, 1625).
- Epistolae medicinales (Rome, Mascardi, 1626).
- Theatrum Florae, in quo ex toto orbe selecti mirabiles, venustiores ac praecipui flores, tanquam ab ipsius Deae sinu, proferuntur (Paris, Pierre Firens, 1627; 1633).
- Antidotario romano latino e volgare tradotto da Ippolito Ceccarelli (Rome, Mascardi, 1628).
- De Abusu phlebotomiae (Rome, Mascardi, 1628).
- Discorso della differenza tra gli semplici freschi et i secchi, con il modo di seccarli (Rome, Mascardi, 1629).
- Incendio del monte Vesuvio di Pietro Castelli (Rome, Mascardi, 1632).
- Discorso dell' eletuario rosato di Mesue, nel quale si raggiona delle rose che entrano in detto elettuario e della scammonea (Rome, Mascardi, 1633).
- Emetica Petri Castelli (Rome, Mascardi, 1634).
- Optimus medicus in quo conditiones perfectissimi medici exponuntur (Rome, Mascardi, 1637).
- Hyaena odorifera (Messina, Bianco, 1638).
- Memoria per lo spetiale romano nel quale si pone il tempo in Roma consueto di raccogliere e seccare le radici, l'erbe, i fiori, i frutti et i semi necessarii per le spetiarie (Messina, Bianco, 1638).
- Chrysopos, cujus nomina, essentia, usus et dosis facili methodo traduntur. Quem sequitur problema de lacte in virginibus, experimentis, auctoritatibus et rationibus explanatum (Messina, Bianco, 1638).
- Balsamum examinatum (Messina, Bianco, 1640).
- Opobalsamum (Messina, Bianco, 1640).
- Hortus Messanensis (Messina, Bianco, 1640).
- De Abusu circa dierum criticorum enumerationem (Messina, Bianco, 1642).
- Epangelia in qua lectiones hoc anno ab ipso habendae in publico Gymnasio super primum librum Aphorismorum Hippocratis enumerantur (Mantoue, Osanna, 1646).
- Responsio chimica D. Petri Castelli,... de effervescentia et mutatione colorum in mixtione liquorum chimicorum (Messine, Brea, 1654).

== Sources ==
- De Ferrari, Augusto (1978). "CASTELLI, Pietro". Dizionario Biografico degli Italiani (in Italian). Vol. 21: Caruso–Castelnuovo. Rome: Institute of the Italian Encyclopaedia. ISBN 978-88-12-00032-6.
- Neil, Erik (2005). "The Hortus Messanensis of Pietro Castelli. Science, Nature, and Landscape Architecture in 17th-Century Messina". Lexicon. 1: 6–19.
