= Andrea Cesalpino =

Italian physician, botanist and philosopher (1524–1603)

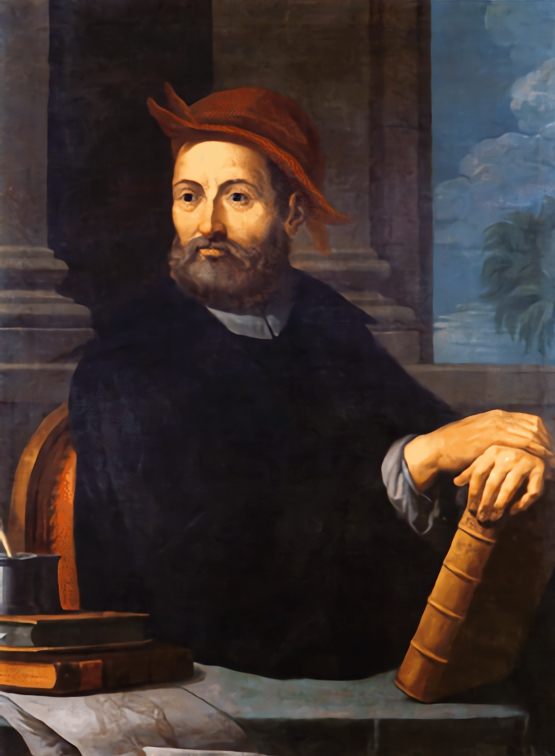
- Born: 6 June 1524; Arezzo, Republic of Florence
- Died: 23 February 1603 (aged 78); Rome
- Other name: Andreas Cæsalpinus
- Education: University of Pisa
- Known for: Quaestionum peripateticarum libri V (1569), De plantis libri XVI (1583)
- Scientific career
- Fields: Medicine
- Workplaces: University of Pisa, University of Rome
- Author abbrev. (botany): Cesalpino

Andrea Cesalpino (Latinized as Andreas Cæsalpinus) (1524/1525 – 23 February 1603) was a Florentine physician, philosopher and botanist.

In his works he classified plants according to their fruits and seeds, rather than alphabetically or by medicinal properties. In 1555, he succeeded Luca Ghini as director of the botanical garden in Pisa. The botanist Pietro Castelli was one of his students. Cesalpino also did limited work in the field of plant and animal physiology. In medicine, he envisioned a "chemical circulation" consisting of repeated evaporation and condensation of blood, and for this reason historians have conceived him as a forerunner of William Harvey (1578–1657), who theorized the "physical circulation" of blood in 1628.

== Biography ==
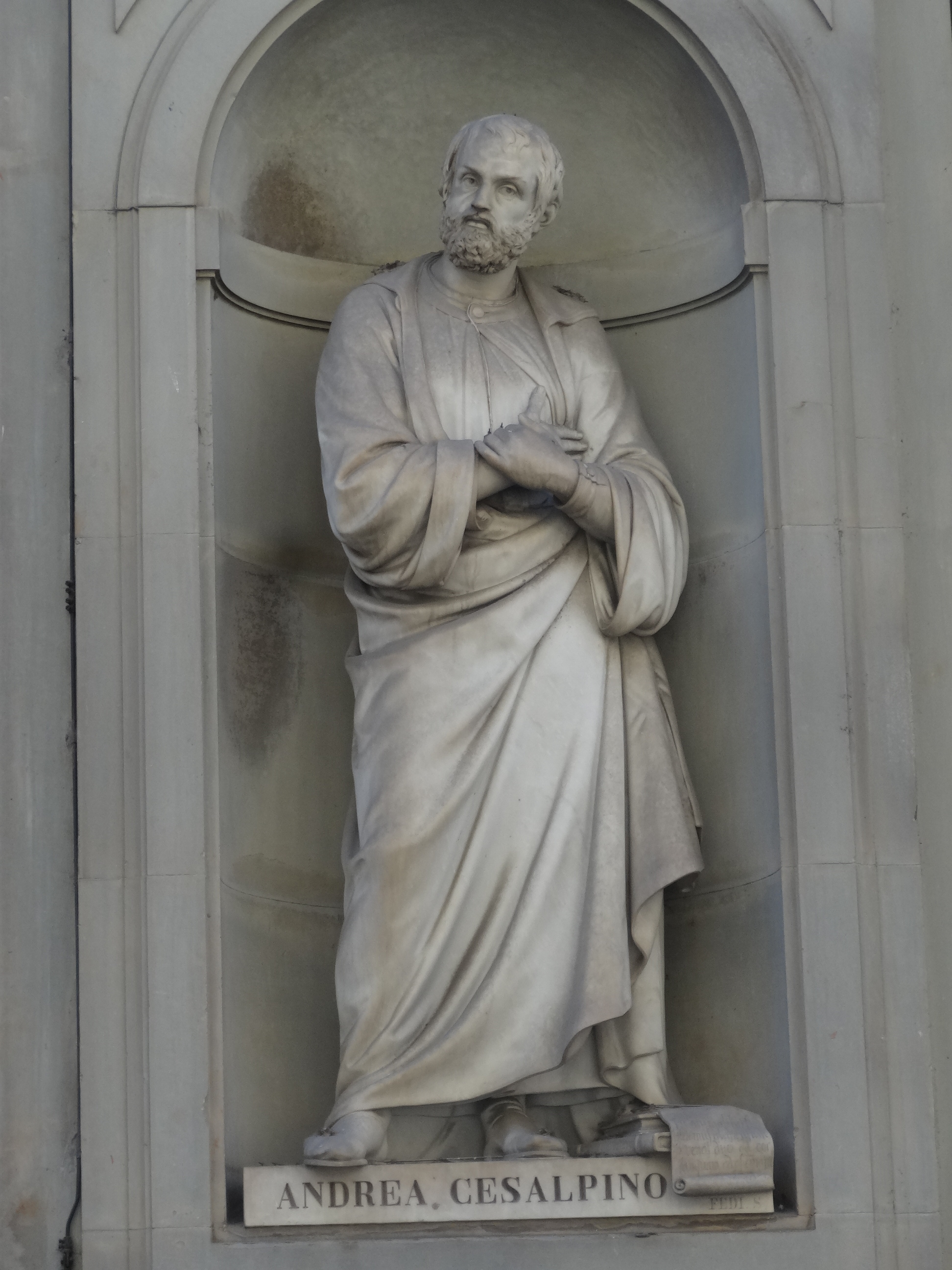
Statue of Cesalpino among the gallery of famous Tuscans in the Loggiato of the Uffizi, sculpted by Pio Fedi

Cesalpino was possibly born in Arezzo, Tuscany. As it is reported by Giuseppe Lais and Ugo Viviani, and recently repeated in a scholarly volume devoted to Cesalpino, he was likely born in the autumn of 1524 or 1525 in the outskirt of Arezzo but many authors give 1519 as the year of his birth, e.g. Frans Stafleu in his Taxonomic Literature 2.

For his studies at the University of Pisa his instructor in medicine was R. Colombo (d. 1559), and in botany the celebrated Luca Ghini. After completing his course he taught philosophy, medicine, and botany for many years at the same university, besides making botanical explorations in various parts of Italy. At this time the first botanical gardens in Europe were laid out; the earliest at Padua, in 1546; the next at Pisa in 1547 by Ghini, who was its first director. Ghini was succeeded by Cesalpino, who had charge of the Pisan garden 1554–1558. When far advanced in years Cesalpino accepted a call to Rome as professor of medicine at University of Rome La Sapienza and physician to Pope Clement VIII. It is not positively certain whether he also became the chief superintendent of the Roman botanical garden which had been laid out about 1566 by one of his most celebrated pupils, Michele Mercati. For the 1600 Jubilee, Cesalpino wrote a text on the history of the Church, entitled Historiae ecclesiasticae compendum usque ad Annum Jubilei MDC, kept as a manuscript at the Biblioteca Apostolica Vaticana in Rome (Vat. Lat. 35600), evidence of his orthodoxy.

== Philosophical works ==
All of Cesalpino's writings show the man of genius and the profound thinker. His style, it is true, is often heavy, yet in spite of the scholastic form in which his works are cast, passages of great beauty often occur. Modern botanists and physiologists who are not acquainted with the writings of Aristotle find Cesalpino's books obscure; their failure to comprehend them has frequently misled them in their judgment of his achievement.

No comprehensive summing up of the results of Cesalpino's investigations, founded on a critical study of all his works has appeared, neither has there been a complete edition of his writings. Seven of these are positively known, and most of the seven have been printed several times, although none have appeared since the 17th century. In the following list the date of publication given is that of the first edition.

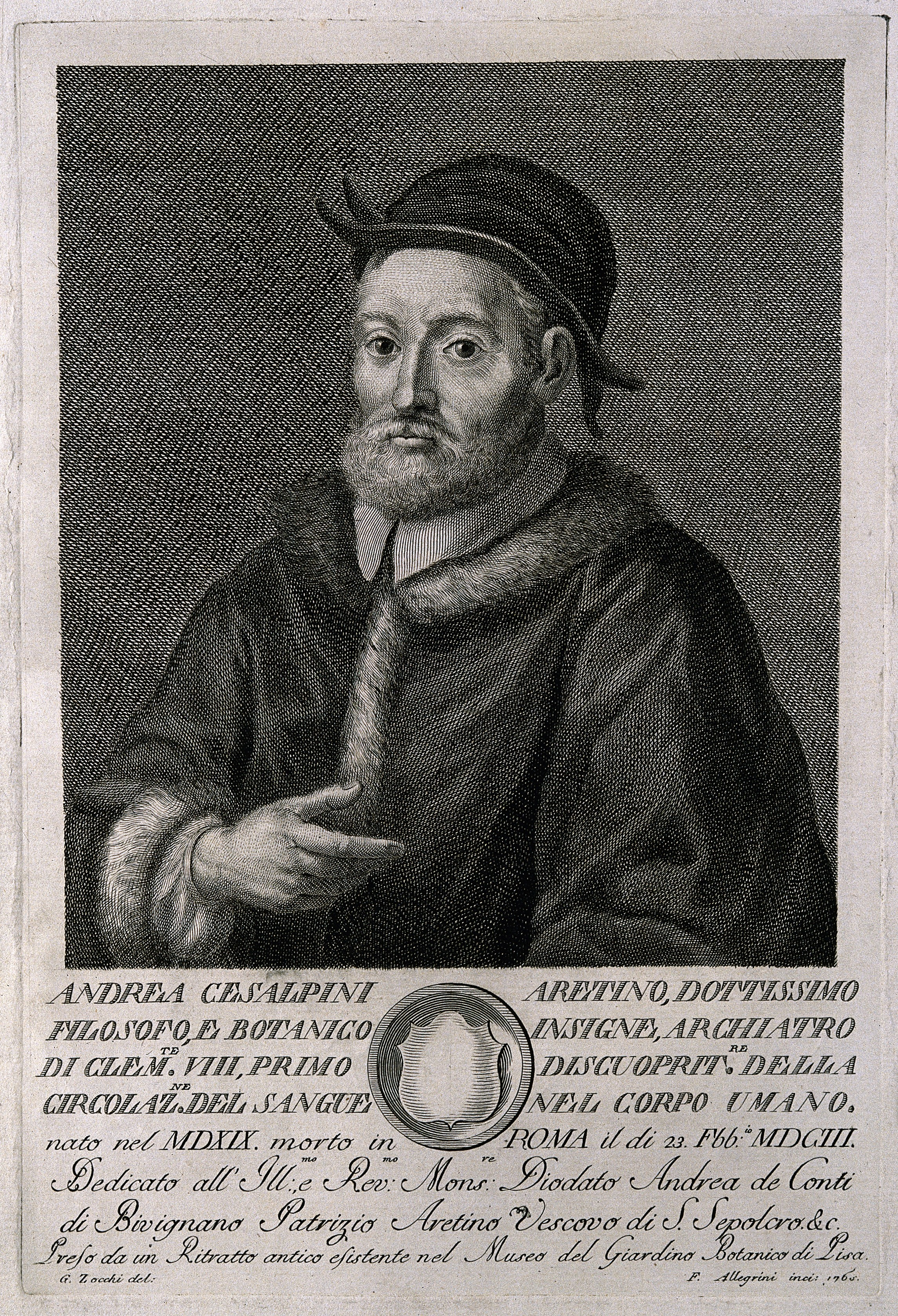
Portrait of Andrea Cesalpino (1519 - 1603)

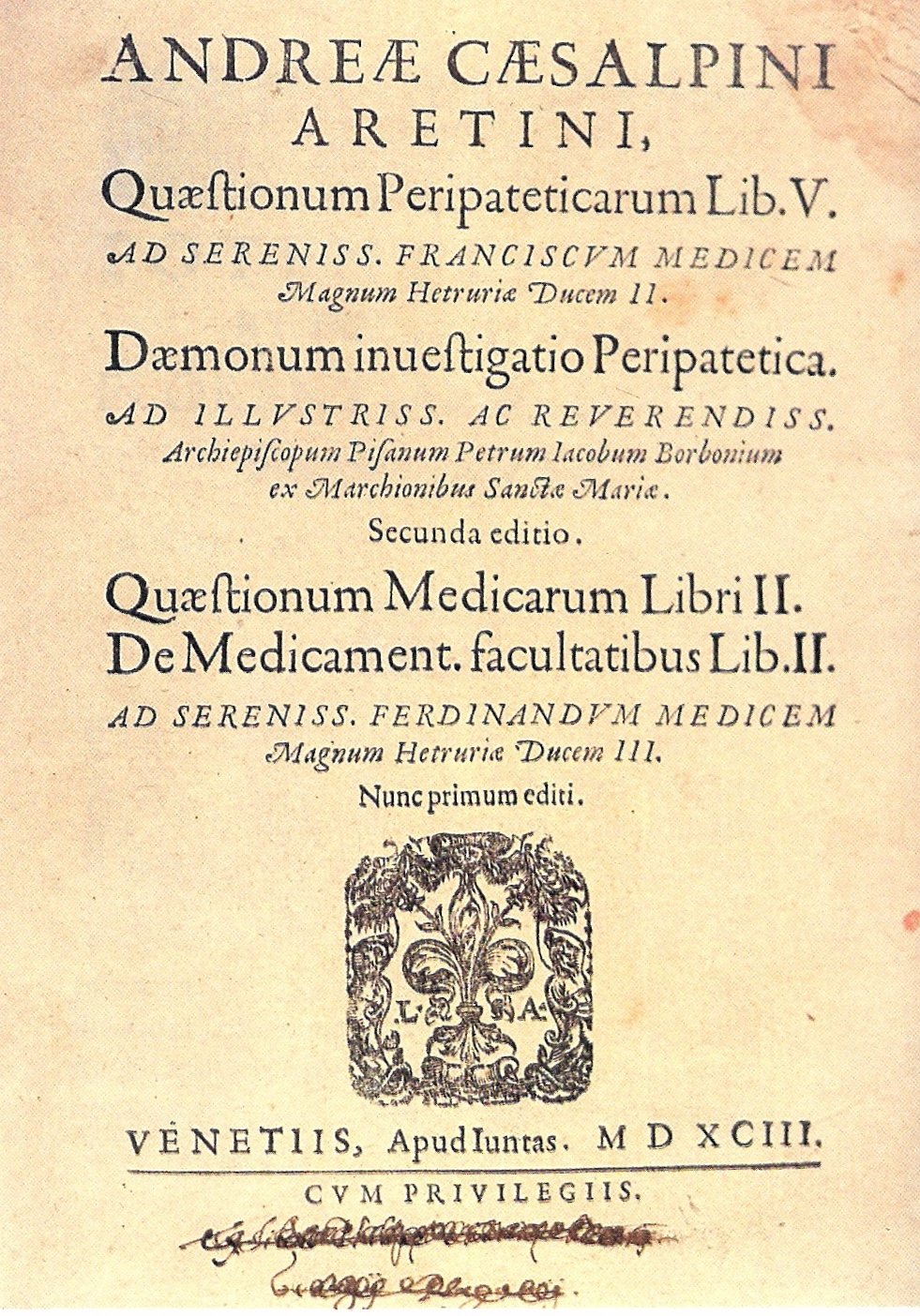
Andrea Cesalpino Quaestionum peripateticarum vol V

His most important philosophical work is Quaestionum peripateticarum libri V (1571). Cesalpino proves himself in this to be one of the most eminent and original students of Aristotle in the 16th century. His writings, however, show traces of the influence of Averroes, hence he is an Averroistic Aristotelian; apparently he was also inclined to pantheism, consequently he was included, later, in the Spinozists before Spinoza. A Protestant opponent of Aristotelian views, Nicolaus Taurellus wrote several times against Cesalpino. The work of Taurellus entitled Alpes cæsae, etc. (1597), is entirely devoted to combating the opinions of Cesalpino, as the play on the name Cæsalpinus shows. Nearly one hundred years later Cesalpino's views were again attacked by Samuel Parker, in a work entitled Disputationes de Deo et providentia divina (1678).

Cesalpino repeatedly asserted the steadfastness of his Catholic principles and his readiness to acknowledge the falsity of any philosophical opinions expounded by him as Aristotelian doctrine, which should be contrary to revelation.

== Medical and physiological works ==
Cesalpino's physiological investigations concerning the circulation of the blood are well known, but even up to the present time they have been as often overestimated as undervalued. An examination of the various passages in his writings which bear upon the question shows that although it must be said that Cesalpino had penetrated further into the secret of circulation of the blood than any other physiologist before William Harvey, still he had not attained a thorough knowledge, founded on anatomical research, of the entire course of the blood. Besides the work Quæstionum peripateticarum already mentioned, reference should be made to Quaestionum medicarum libri duo (1593).

== Botanical works ==
His most important publication was De plantis libri XVI (1583). The work is dedicated to the Grand Duke Francesco I de' Medici. Unlike the "herbals" of that period, it contains no illustrations. The first section, including thirty pages of the work, is the part of most importance for botany in general. From the beginning of the 17th century up to the present day botanists have agreed in the opinion that Cesalpino in this work, in which he took Aristotle for his guide, laid the foundation of the morphology and physiology of plants and produced the first scientific classification of flowering plants. Three things, above all, give the book the stamp of individuality: the large number of original, acute observations, especially on flowers, fruits, and seeds, made, moreover, before the invention of the microscope, the selection of the organs of fructification for the foundation of his botanical system; finally, the ingenious and at the same time strictly philosophical handling of the rich material gathered by observation. Cesalpino's selection of seeds and seed-receptacles as the primary criteria for plant classification heavily influenced the classificatory work of John Ray, a major seventeenth-century British naturalist. After his death, an incomplete supplementary to this work, entitled Appendix ad libros de plantis et quaestiones peripateticas (1603), was published.

Cesalpino is also famous in the history of botany as one of the first botanists to make an herbarium; one of the oldest herbaria still in existence is that which he arranged in 1563 for Bishop Alfonso Tornabuoni. After many changes of fortune the herbarium is now in the Museo di Storia Naturale di Firenze at Florence. It consists of 260 folio pages arranged in three volumes bound in red leather, and contains 768 species of plants. A work of some value for chemistry, mineralogy, and geology was issued by him under the title De metallicis libri tres (Rome, 1596). This mostly relies on the Vatican Methalloteca, and it was prepared by Mercati, who was unable to complete it due to his early death. Some of its matter recalls the discoveries made at the end of the eighteenth century, as those of Antoine Lavoisier and René Just Haüy, it also shows a correct understanding of fossils.

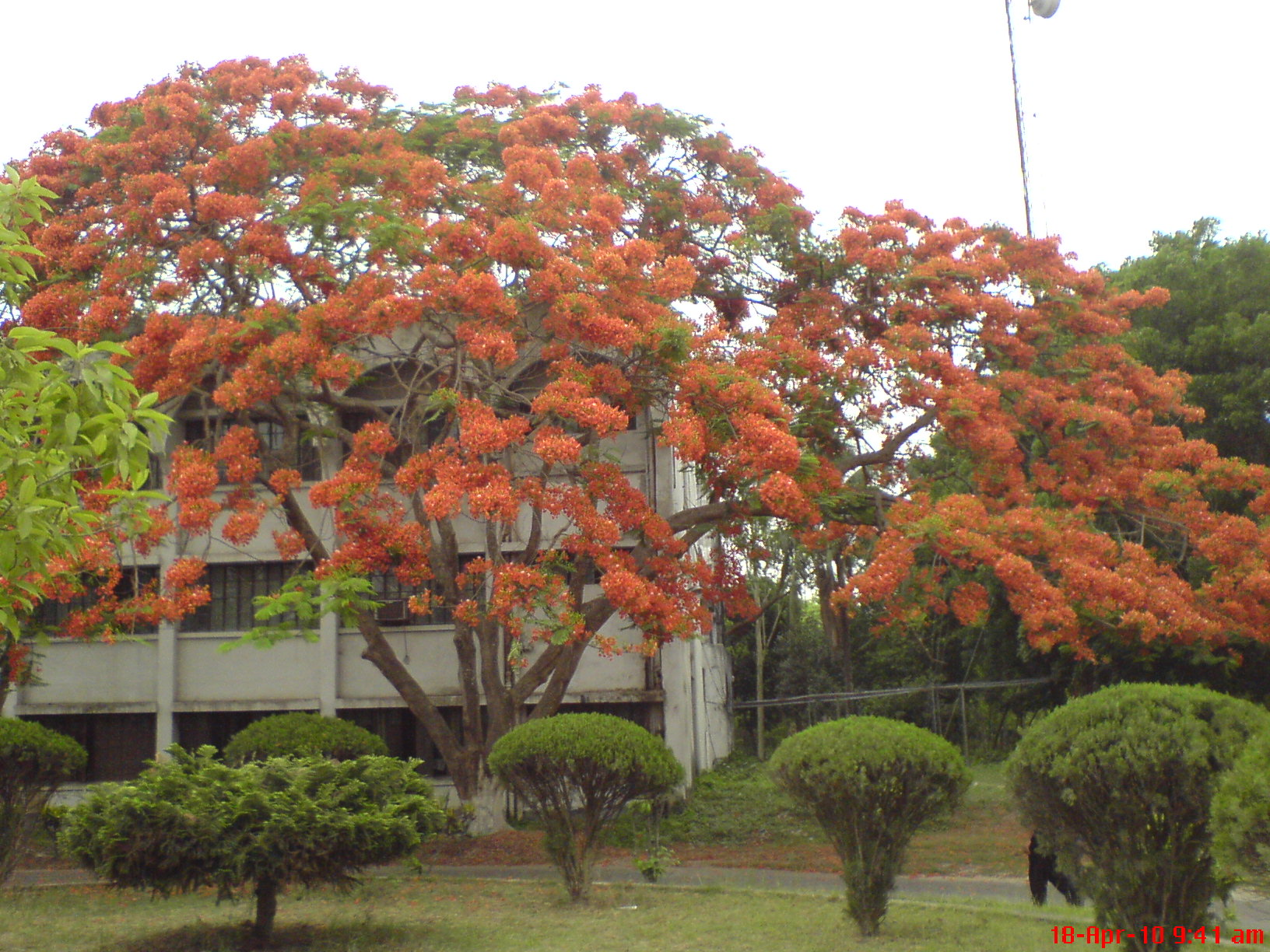
Cæsalpinia pulcherrima

The Franciscan friar Charles Plumier gave the name of Cæsalpinia to a plant genus and Linnaeus retained it in his system. At the present day this genus includes approximately 10 species and belongs family Fabaceae, subfamily Cæsalpinioideae, which contains a large number of useful plants. Linnaeus in his writings often quotes his great predecessor in the science of botany and praises Cesalpino in the following lines:

Quisquis hic exstiterit primos concedat honores
Cæsalpine tibi primaque certa dabit.

== Geology ==
As mentioned above, De metallicis libri tres (Rome, 1596) was of value for mineralogy and geology, displaying a correct understanding of fossils. Charles Lyell's Principles of Geology states that in 1596,

Cesalpino, a celebrated botanist, conceived that fossil shells had been left on the land by the sea, and had concreted into stone during the consolidation of the soil."
