= Rosaria Conte =

Rosaria Conte (14 April 1954 in Rome – 5 July 2016 in Rome) was an Italian social scientist. She was the head of the Laboratory of Agent Based Social Simulation at the ISTC-CNR in Rome, which hosts an interdisciplinary research group working at the intersection among cognitive, social and computational sciences. She was President of European Social Simulation Association and AISC (Italian Cognitive Science Association). Rosaria Conte published more than 130 works among volumes, papers in scientific journals, conference proceedings and book chapters. Her scientific activity aims at explaining social behaviour among intelligent autonomous systems, and modeling the dynamics of norms and norm-enforcement mechanisms (including reputation and gossip). Her research was characterized by a highly interdisciplinary approach, at the intersection among cognitive, social and computational sciences. In her name, the European Social Simulation Association assigns every other year the Outstanding Contribution Award for Social Simulation, whose first recipients are Nigel Gilbert and Uri Wilensky.

== Career ==
Conte was born in Foggia. She studied philosophy at the Sapienza University of Rome. In 1980 she received a Postdoctoral Fellowship at Department of Sociology, UCSD, USA, under the supervision of the sociologist Aaron Cicourel. In 1985 she completed her education with a visiting period at the Department of Psychology of the Johns Hopkins University, Baltimore, USA.

Rosaria Conte's scientific interest focused on Social order, Agent Theory, Emergence and the Evolution of Social institutions, Deontic logic, Social simulation and Cultural evolution. From 1982 to 2001 she was Junior Scientist at the Institute of Psychology (IP, now Institute of Cognitive Science and Technology, ISTC) of Cnr. In 1998 she founded the Laboratory of Agent Based Social Simulation (LABSS), at ISTC-CNR. In the same period she started teaching Social Psychology at the University of Siena.

In 2001 she became Honorary Associate Researcher at Center for Policy Making of Business School, Manchester Metropolitan University, UK. In 2006 she was elected President of AISC (Italian Cognitive Science Association), and in 2008 became President of the European Social Simulation Association. In 2015 she became Vice Head of the Psychology Faculty at the Università telematica internazionale Uninettuno.

Rosaria Conte was Vice President of the Scientific Committee of the National Research Council (Italy) and Member of the Italian National Bioethics Committee. She died in Rome in 2016.

== Selected publications ==
- D. Villatoro, G.Andrighetto, R. Conte, J. Sabater-Mir (2011), Dynamic Sanctioning for Robust and Cost-Efficient Norm Compliance, In Proceedings of the Twenty-Second International Joint Conference on Artificial Intelligence (IJCAI 2011). https://web.archive.org/web/20110930223630/http://www.istc.cnr.it/bibtex.php?id=2669
- F. Giardini, R. Conte (2011), Gossip for Social Control in Natural and Artificial Societies, Simulation: Transactions of the Society for Modeling and Simulation International. http://sim.sagepub.com/content/early/2011/05/19/0037549711406912.full.pdf
- Andrighetto, G., Villatoro, D., Conte, R (2010). Norm internalization in artificial societies, in AI Communications, pp. 1–15. http://www.deepdyve.com/lp/ios-press/norm-internalization-in-artificial-societies-QwnPbkdiGX
- Conte, R. (2010) Rational, Goal-directed Agents. Encyclopedia of Complex Social Systems, Springer, Encyclopedia. https://web.archive.org/web/20110930224157/http://www.istc.cnr.it/bibtex.php?id=2245
- Tummolini, L., Andrighetto, G., Castelfranchi, C. & Conte, R. (pres). A convention or (tacit) agreement betwixt us: on reliance and its normative consequences. Synthese. https://cnr-it.academia.edu/LucaTummolini/Papers/152049/A_convention_or_tacit_agreement_betwixt_us_on_reliance_and_its_normative_consequences
- Campennì, M., Cecconi, F., Andrighetto, G., Conte, R., (2010). Norm and Social Compliance A Computational Study. The International Journal of Agent Technologies and Systems (IJATS), 2 (1), 50–62. http://www.igi-global.com/bookstore/article.aspx?titleid=39032
- Cecconi, F.; Campennì, M.; Andrighetto, G.; Conte, R. (2010). "What Do Agent-Based and Equation-Based Modelling Tell Us About Social Conventions: The Clash Between ABM and EBM in a Congestion Game Framework". Journal of Artificial Societies and Social Simulation. 13 (1): 6. doi:10.18564/jasss.1585.
- Pitt, J., Conte, R., Dung, P., Sartor, G., Troitzsch, K., Draief, M., Andrighetto, G. (2010). Modular Argumentation and the Dynamics of (Il)Legality: A Position Statement on ICT for Governance and Policy Modelling. Best Contributions on the State of the Art and Future of ICT for Governance and Policy Modelling. https://web.archive.org/web/20120501094125/http://crossroad.epu.ntua.gr/files/2010/04/13_moduleg.pdf
- Campenní, Marco; Andrighetto, Giulia; Cecconi, Federico; Conte, Rosaria (December 2009). "Normal = Normative? The role of intelligent agents in norm innovation". Mind & Society. 8 (2): 153–172. doi:10.1007/s11299-009-0063-4. S2CID 52073203.
- Paolucci M., Conte R. (2009). Reputation: Social Transmission for Partner Selection. In Trajkovski G. P. & Collins S. G. (Eds.), Handbook of Research on Agent-Based Societies: Social and Cultural Interactions (pp. 243–260). Hershey: IGI Publishing. https://web.archive.org/web/20110930224708/http://www.istc.cnr.it/doc/70a_553p_PaolucciConteComplete.pdf
- Paolucci, M; Conte, R; Marmo, S; Picascia, S; Quattrociocchi, W; Eymann, T; Balke, T; König, S; Jager, W; Broekhuizen, T.L.J; Trampe, D; Tuk, M.A; Sabater, J; Pinyol, I; Villatoro, D; Brito, I (2009). "Social knowledge for eGovernance: Theory and technology of reputation". eRep booklet, EU sixth framework programme, Priority 7, Citizens and governance in the knowledge based society. OCLC 6893138284.
- Quattrociocchi, Walter; Paolucci, Mario; Conte, Rosaria (2009). "Image and Reputation Coping Differently with Massive Informational Cheating". Visioning and Engineering the Knowledge Society. A Web Science Perspective. Lecture Notes in Computer Science. Vol. 5736. pp. 574–583. doi:10.1007/978-3-642-04754-1_58. ISBN 978-3-642-04753-4.
- Conte, R.; Paolucci, M.; Sabater Mir, J (2008). "Reputation for Innovating Social Networks" (PDF). Advances in Complex Systems. 11 (2): 303–320. doi:10.1142/s0219525908001647. S2CID 14540110.
- Giardini, F.; Di Tosto, G.; Conte, R. (2008). "A Model for Simulating Reputation Dynamics in Industrial Districts". Simulation Modelling Practice and Theory. 16 (2): 231–241. doi:10.1016/j.simpat.2007.11.017.
- Di Tosto, G.; Paolucci, M.; Conte, R. (2007). "Altruism Among Simple and Smart Vampires". International Journal of Cooperative Information Systems. 16 (1): 51–66. doi:10.1142/s0218843007001561.
- Conte, Rosaria; Castelfranchi, Cristiano (December 2006). "The Mental Path of Norms". Ratio Juris. 19 (4): 501–517. doi:10.1111/j.1467-9337.2006.00342.x. S2CID 144430806.
- Paolucci, M.; Conte, R.; Di Tosto, G. (2006). "A Model of Social Organization and the Evolution of Food Sharing in Vampire Bats". Adaptive Behavior. 14 (3): 223–239. doi:10.1177/105971230601400305. S2CID 21920618.
- Sabater, J.; Paolucci, M.; Conte, R. (2006). "Repage: REPutation and ImAGE Among Limited Autonomous Partners". Journal of Artificial Societies and Social Simulation. 9 (2).
- Conte, R.; Paolucci, M. (2004). "Responsibility for Societies of Agents". Journal of Artificial Societies and Social Simulation. 7: 4.
- Conte R. (2003). Review of simulating organizations: Computational models of institutions and groups. Journal of Artificial Societies and Social Simulation, N° 6. http://jasss.soc.surrey.ac.uk/6/2/reviews/conte.html
- Conte, Rosaria (14 May 2002). "Agent-based modeling for understanding social intelligence". Proceedings of the National Academy of Sciences of the United States of America. 99 (Suppl 3): 7189–7190. Bibcode:2002PNAS...99.7189C. doi:10.1073/pnas.072078999. PMC 128580. PMID 11997442.
