= Institute for Chemical-Physical Processes =

Italian research institute

The Institute for Chemical-Physical Processes (IPCF) is part of the Department of Materials and Devices of the Italian Research Council.

== Mission ==
Multidisciplinary research and training for the understanding of processes and basic phenomena in physics and chemistry, for the development of new methodologies and applications in many field of high social and economical impact, like health, environment, energy, industrial technologies and cultural heritage.

== About IPCF ==
The Institute for Physical and Chemical Processes was established in the year 2000, merging the research expertise of previous Italian Research Council units, as an answer to the growing demand for a new trend in the relationships between science and society, industry and training. It is part of the Department of Materials and Devices of the Italian Research Council and is located in Messina with divisions in Bari, Cosenza, Pisa and Rome.

IPCF is a multidisciplinary institute where theoretical, computational and experimental approaches are combined in specific fields of physical and chemical disciplines, namely new models and devices, environment and Soft Matter. The staff includes about 90 researchers and 30 technicians and administrative officers.

Scientists and technicians carry out their activities in chemistry and physics, life and material sciences, with both theoretical and experimental approaches.

Their expertise covers a wide variety of disciplines including synthetic chemistry, analytical and spectroscopic techniques, thermodynamics and calorimetry, lasers, molecular design, modeling and computational chemistry, and nanotechnologies.

== Location ==
Headquarters of the IPCF are located close to the University of Messina campus, thus enabling a continuous cultural exchange with researchers of the Science and Engineering faculties. The Bari Division is lodged within the premises of the Department of Chemistry at the University of Bari, which offers access to its facilities (accommodation, libraries, sport etc.). The Cosenza Division is located in Rende, within the University of Calabria, and cooperates closely with the local department of physics. The Pisa Division is part of the Italian Research Council Campus at Pisa, the largest in Italy, with a highly multidisciplinary presence of scientific institutes of international level, covering the fields of medicine, information science and technology, life and earth sciences and basic sciences. Finally, the Roma Division is located in the central headquarters of the Italian Research Council.

== Facilities ==
The IPCF technological support to the research activity is complete, including computer assisted design, high precision mechanical workshop, micro-machining, advanced electronics, glass workshop, surface polishing and coating, free-standing thin foil preparation, laser optics design and optimisation, chemical preparations.

Each IPCF Division has meeting rooms fully equipped for seminars and video conferences. Conference rooms with a larger accommodation capacity (up to 300 persons) are provided by the CNR Campus in Pisa for hosting workshops and other events.

== Research activities ==
The research activities of IPCF, concerning the three main scientific fields of fundamental research, innovative methodologies and soft matter, can be grouped in the following areas:

- Advanced laser technologies
- Biotechnologies
- Theorethical chemistry and physics and molecular modelling
- Magnetic resonance spectroscopy
- Instrumental analytical chemistry
- Soft chemistry approaches for fabrication of multifunctional nanostructured materials
- Optical and in-silico characterization and manipulation of nanoscale systems
- Thermodynamics, characterization of materials and microwave assisted heating
- Microscopy and nanotechnology

The research activities of IPCF are carried out in laboratories having up-to-date scientific and technological equipment and collaborating with a large number of academic and private national and international institutions.The research activities carried out at IPCF have resulted in numerous peer reviewed publications, patents, scientific reports and contributions to international conferences.

== Training ==
IPCF staff has a long time experience in tutoring and training students and young scientists from Italy and abroad. Each year about 40 young people affording master's degree, PhD and post-doc grants are trained at IPCF.
