= Gustavo Colonnetti =

Italian mathematician (1886–1968)

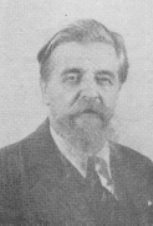
- Born: 8 November 1886; Turin, Italy
- Died: 20 March 1968 (aged 81); Turin, Italy
- Education: Polytechnic University of Turin (Laurea in engineering, 1908); University of Turin (Laurea in mathematics, 1911)
- Known for: Colonnetti's theorem
- Scientific career
- Fields: Civil engineering Linear elasticity Mathematics
- Workplaces: University of Pisa; Polytechnic University of Turin

Gustavo Colonnetti (8 November 1886 – 20 March 1968) was an Italian mathematician and engineer who made important contributions to continuum mechanics and strength of materials. He was a Rector of the Polytechnic University of Turin and President of CNR (Consiglio Nazionale delle Ricerche). His theories found important applications in modern techniques of construction, such as pre-stressed concrete.

He is remembered for Colonnetti's theorem (or Colonnetti's minimum principle) which states that in equilibrium the potential energy function W^{*} is minimized.

== Life ==
=== Honours ===
He was nominated member of the Pontificial Academy of Sciences on October 28, 1936. In 1947, during the first meeting of the RILEM in Sorrento, he was elected the first president of the society, and began its mandate in 1948. The same year, on 27 August 1947, he was elected corresponding member of the Accademia Nazionale dei Lincei: nearly a year later, on 15 July 1948, he was elected full member.

== Work ==
=== Research activity ===
Due figure particolarmente significative nella teoria dell'elasticità in Italia furono Gustavo Colonnetti e Giulio Krall. Rappresentò, ciascuno di essi, una sintesi quasi perfetta tra la figura dell'ingegnere e quella del matematico.

— Gaetano Fichera, (Fichera 1979, p. 21).

=== Teaching activity ===
Queste pagine–in cui ho raccolte le lezioni da me impartite quest'anno agli allievi del Politecnico di Torino–rispecchiano fedelmente la concezione didattica a cui io ispiro il mio insegnamento; il quale si propone, deliberatamente, finalità di alta cultura, e, solo subordinatamente, di preparazione professionale. La scelta degli argomenti è stata fatta con quest'unica preoccupazione: di offrire allo studioso i principii fondamentali, di approfondirne il significato e la portata, di vedere come si possa su di essi costruire un corpo razionale di dottrine, e come questo possa poi venire, di volta in volta, utilizzato per risolvere problemi concreti. Gli argomenti che meglio si prestano a tale scopo sono stati sviluppati a fondo. Altri, per se stessi non meno importanti, ma sotto questo punto di vista meno suggestivi, sono stati in tutto o in parte trascurati. Il lettore non troverà qui la solita raccolta di soluzioni fatte, da applicare–a proposito o a sproposito–a tutti i problemi che la pratica tecnica gli potrà presentare. Ma potrà imparare ad analizzare ed a risolvere ciascuno di quei problemi, rendendosi conto del valore delle ipotesi su cui la soluzione si fonda e del grado di approssimazione ch'essa comporta.

— Gustavo Colonnetti, (Colonnetti 1941, p. i).

== Selected publications ==
=== Books ===
- Colonnetti, Gustavo (1941), Scienza delle costruzioni (in Italian), Turin: Edizioni Scientifiche Einaudi, pp. viii+509.
- Colonnetti, Gustavo (1960), Elastoplasticità, Scripta varia (in Italian), vol. 19, Città del Vaticano: Pontificia Academia Scientiarum, p. 110, Zbl 0102.16902.
- Colonnetti, Gustavo (1960), L'équilibre des corps déformables (in French), Paris: Dunod, p. 162

=== Papers ===
- Colonnetti, Gustavo (1962), "Singolari proprietà degli stati di coazione" [Singular properties of constraint states], [Atti della Accademia Nazionale dei Lincei. Classe di Scienze Fisiche, Matematiche e Naturali. Rendiconti], Serie VIII (in Italian), 32 (4), Roma: Accademia Nazionale dei Lincei: 429–431, Zbl 0105.36901.
