= Orto Botanico "Pietro Castelli" dell'Università di Messina =

Botanical garden in Messina, Sicily, Italy

Coordinates: 38.1924°N 15.5462°E

The Orto Botanico "Pietro Castelli" dell'Università di Messina (8000 m²), also known as the Orto botanico di Messina, is a botanical garden operated by the University of Messina and located at Piazza 20 Settembre, Messina, Sicily, Italy.

The university's first botanical garden was established in 1638 by Pietro Castelli, but destroyed by the Spanish along with the rest of the university in 1678. Although in 1889 the garden was reestablished on the banks of the river Portalegni, this second version was ruined by the earthquake of 1908, and most of its site then devoted to building construction.

== Specimens ==
Today the garden's trees include:

- Calodendrum capensis
- Casuarina torulosa
- Chorisia insignis
- Dracaena draco
- Ficus macrophylla
- Ginkgo biloba
- Livistona chinensis
- Phoenix canariensis
- Pinus brutia
- Pinus longifolia
- Pterocarya caucasica
- Trachycarpus excelsius
- Washingtonia filifera

Other plants of interest include:

- Anona cherimolia
- Eugenia jambos
- Eugenia myrtifolia
- Eugenia uniflora
- Feijoa sellowiana
- Flacourtia indica
- Mangifera indica
- Nymphaea capensis
- Nymphaea alba
- Persea gratissima
- Pithecoctenium cynanchoides
- Pontederia cordata
- Psidium guajava
- Psidium cattleianum

== Bibliography ==
- Erik Neil, The Hortus Messanensis of Pietro Castelli. Science, Landscape, and Collecting in 17th Century Messina, in "Lexicon. Storie e architettura in Sicilia" n. 1, 2005

== See also ==
- List of botanical gardens in Italy
