= Gherardo Cibo =

Italian botanist and painter (1512–1600)

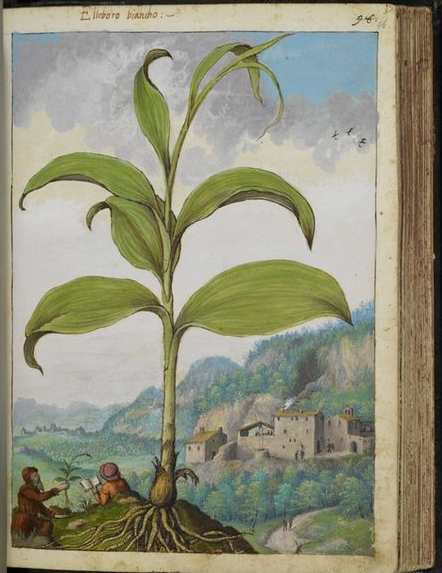
A plate of by Cibo, showing herbalists in the field and Polygonatum in the foreground, Mattioli's Dioscorides illustrated by Cibo, f. 96r

Gherardo Cibo, also known by the alias of Ulisse Severini da Cingoli (1512 − 30 January 1600), was an artist and a herbalist from Italy. The herbarium that he began in 1532 is the oldest surviving example of the method invented in Italy by his contemporaries and is preserved in Rome. His illustrations of plants show plants in the foreground with landscapes and details of people and places in the background.

Cibo was born in Genoa in 1512 to Aranino and Bianca Vigeri Della Rovere (daughter of the bishop of Senigallia) in a wealthy family related to the Duke of Urbino. His paternal great-grandfather was Giovanni Battista Cibo better known as Pope Innocent VIII. After some early years in Genoa he moved to Rome where he stayed with his aunt, the Duchess of Camerino, Caterina Cibo da Varano and sought to join the clergy but war led to his movement to Bologna where he studied botany under Luca Ghini. His studies during this period ending in 1532 included the collection of plants and the creation of a herbarium. In 1534 he moved to Agnano and stayed with Lorenzo Cibo where he made trips around Pisa. In 1539 he visited Germany and travelled to Marches, Umbria and moved to Rome in 1553. He spent the largest part of his life in Arcevia.

Cibo left diaries of his daily trips, illustrations of the landscapes. He studied the works of Pliny, Leonhart Fuchs and Pierandrea Mattioli. He corresponded with Mattioli and Ulisse Aldrovandi and Andrea Bacci. He maintained his herbarium in alphabetical order. The letters and collections are scattered across museums and archives. Books in his library that have survived at the Biblioteca Angelica include Historia Stirpium by Leonhart Fuchs, a copy of the Historia dei semplici by Garcia da Orta as well as 1548, 1558 and 1573 editions of Discorsi by Mattioli with illustrations added by Cibo.

The most important part of his artistic production is the corpus of landscape drawings done in pen and ink or sanguine, and his botanical illustrations in watercolour and tempera. Over 220 botanical illustrations can be found in two illuminated manuscripts kept in the British Library (Mattioli's Dioscorides illustrated by Cibo, Add. Ms. 22332 and Add. Ms. 22333). Cibo’s illustrations are executed with great accuracy and feature different plants, usually common species of Italy and the central Apennines. They are often placed against the brightly coloured landscapes of their natural habitat, sometimes with scenes of daily life and details of buildings. The illustrations are accompanied by botanical commentaries excerpted from Discorsi by Pietro Andrea Mattioli (glossed Italian translation of Dioscorides’ De materia medica) and notes by Cibo himself.

== Bibliography ==
- Sprague, T. A.; Nelmes, E. (1 October 1931). "The Herbal of Leonhart Fuchs". Botanical Journal of the Linnean Society. 48 (325): 545–642. doi:10.1111/j.1095-8339.1931.tb00596.x.
