= Sforza degli Oddi =

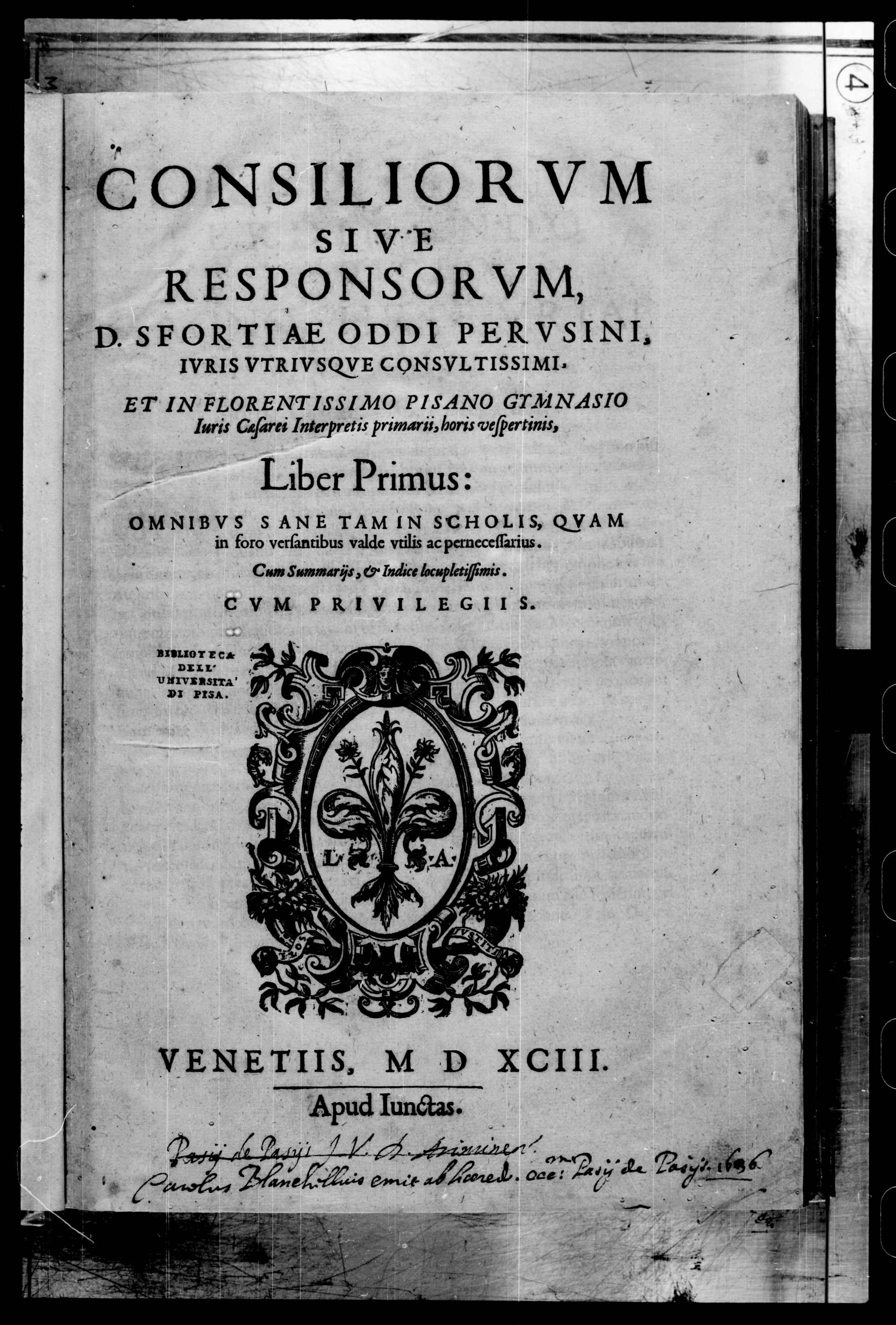
- Born: 1540; Perugia
- Died: 1611 (aged 70–71); Parma

Sforza degli Oddi (Italian: Sforza degli Oddi; 1540 - 1611) was an Italian lawyer, poet and playwright.

== Biography ==
Sforza degli Oddi was born into a noble family. He was a member of the Literary Academy in Perugia and directed law schools in Macerata, Pavia, and Pisa. Later, he was an adviser to the Duke of Farnese and a professor at the University of Parma. In 1569, he took the chair of jurisprudence at the University of Perugia.

He was the author of three prose plays: Erofilomachia (Venice, 1572), I morti vivi (Perugia, 1576), and La prigione d’amore (Florence, 1572). The works are reminiscent of Latin comedies in their structure, but were not characterized by the typical intrigues of 16th-century comedies, but by a sense of the pathetic and dramatic, generally more suitable for modern drama. The works he wrote were so imbued with the morality of feelings that his contemporary, Abbot Bernardino Pino da Cagli, added a eulogy to the work in a subsequent edition of Erofilomachia.

The author's poetic works were very successful. His main legal works are:

- "De compendiosa substitutione" (Perugia, 1571),
- "De restitutione in integrum tractatus" (1584),
- "Consilia, Venezia, Lucantonio Giunta" (1593),
- "Tractatus de substitutionibus.." (1600),
- "De fideicommissis" (ibid., 1622),
- "De restitutione in integrum" (Frankfurt, 1672).

== Literature ==
- "Одди, Сфорца". Brockhaus and Efron Encyclopedic Dictionary: In 86 Volumes (82 Volumes and 4 Additional Volumes) (in Russian). St. Petersburg: F. A. Brockhaus. 1890–1907.
