= John McCourt (academic) =

Irish academic (born 1965)

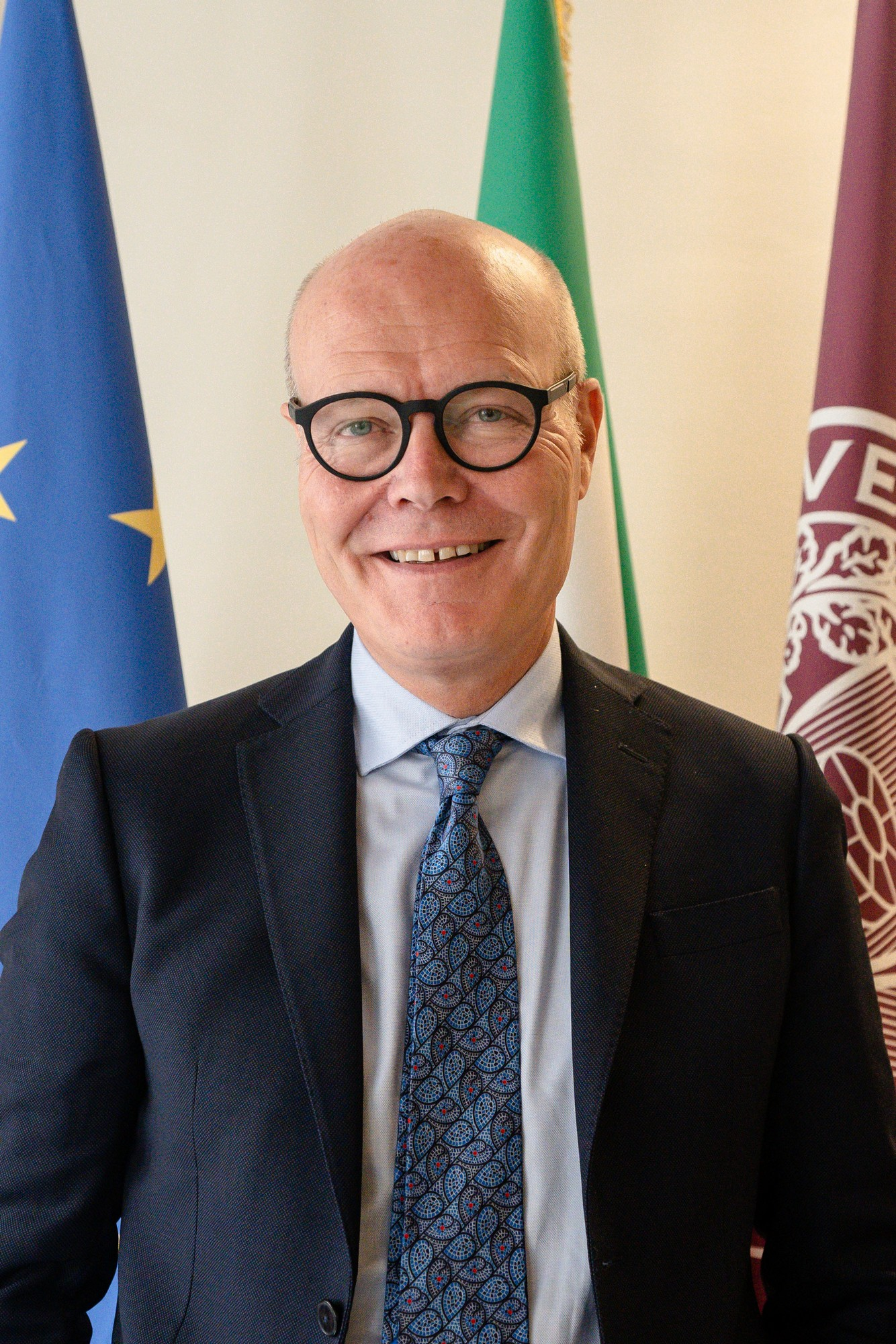
- Born: John Francis McCourt; July 18, 1965 (age 61); Dublin, Ireland

Academic background
- Education: University College Dublin (BA, MA, PhD)

Academic work
- Institutions: University of Macerata; Roma Tre University
- Main interests: Irish literature; James Joyce; English literature

John Francis McCourt (born 18 July 1965) is an Irish academic and professor of English literature who specializes in the works of James Joyce. He was appointed rector of the University of Macerata in 2022, becoming the first foreign rector of an Italian university.

== Early life and education ==
McCourt was born in Dublin in 1965. He earned a Bachelor of Arts in English literature at University College Dublin in 1988, a Master of Arts in Anglo-Irish literature in 1989, and a doctorate in English literature in 1997.

== Career ==
Before completing his doctorate, McCourt served as an adjunct professor at Michigan State University in 1989 and taught English language at the British School of Trieste from 1991 to 1993. He worked with Franz Stanzel at the University of Graz in 1994 and became a professor of English language at the University of Udine from 1996 to 1998. He lectured at the University of Trieste from 1993 to 2005, where he was a research fellow for four years.

McCourt built his academic career in Italy, establishing himself as a scholar of English and Irish literature within the Italian university system. He became a professor of English literature at Roma Tre University in 2010, where he was director of the Research Centre for Irish and Scottish Studies. He was a visiting professor at the University of Pennsylvania in 2006 and Sorbonne University in 2016.

He joined the University of Macerata in 2017 and was appointed rector in 2022. His appointment at one of the oldest universities in Italy received media attention for being the first time that a foreigner was appointed head of an Italian university. Michael Murphy, president of the European University Association, congratulated McCourt for breaking the perceived glass ceiling in Italian education.

McCourt has written on the relationship between Joyce and Italy, and on the broader cultural and literary connections between Ireland and the Italian peninsula. In 2020, McCourt became president of the International James Joyce Foundation. McCourt is a member of the Modern Language Association and the board of the International Yeats Summer School in Sligo, Ireland.

== Awards ==
- Giovanni Comisso Prize (2005)
- Mellon Fellowship, University of Texas at Austin (2007)
- "Le Cattedrali Letterarie Europee" Prize, Cultural Association (2007)
- Peter O'Brien Visiting Scholar, Concordia University (2019)

== Selected works ==
- Writing the Frontier: Anthony Trollope between Britain and Ireland (Oxford University Press, 2015) ISBN 9780198729600
- The Years of Bloom: James Joyce in Trieste, 1904–1920 (Lilliput Press and University of Wisconsin Press, 2000) ISBN 1901866459
- Roll Away the Reel World: James Joyce and Cinema (Cork University Press, 2010) ISBN 9781859184714
- James Joyce: A Passionate Exile (Thomas Dunne Books, 1999) ISBN 9780312269418
- James Joyce in Context (Cambridge University Press, 2009) ISBN 9780511576072
