= National Research Council (Italy) =

Italian national research funding organization

Coordinates: 41.9010°N 12.5126°E

Consiglio Nazionale delle Ricerche
- Established: 1923; 103 years ago
- President: Andrea Lenzi
- Location: Piazzale Aldo Moro 7, Rome, Italy
- Website: http://www.cnr.it

The National Research Council (Italian: Consiglio Nazionale delle Ricerche, akronym CNR) is the largest research organization of Italy, with >9,000 employees. Its structure includes 83 research institutes, 3 research bases at the Poles and one oceanografic research vessel. As a public organisation, its remit is to support scientific and technological research. Its headquarters are in Rome.

== History ==
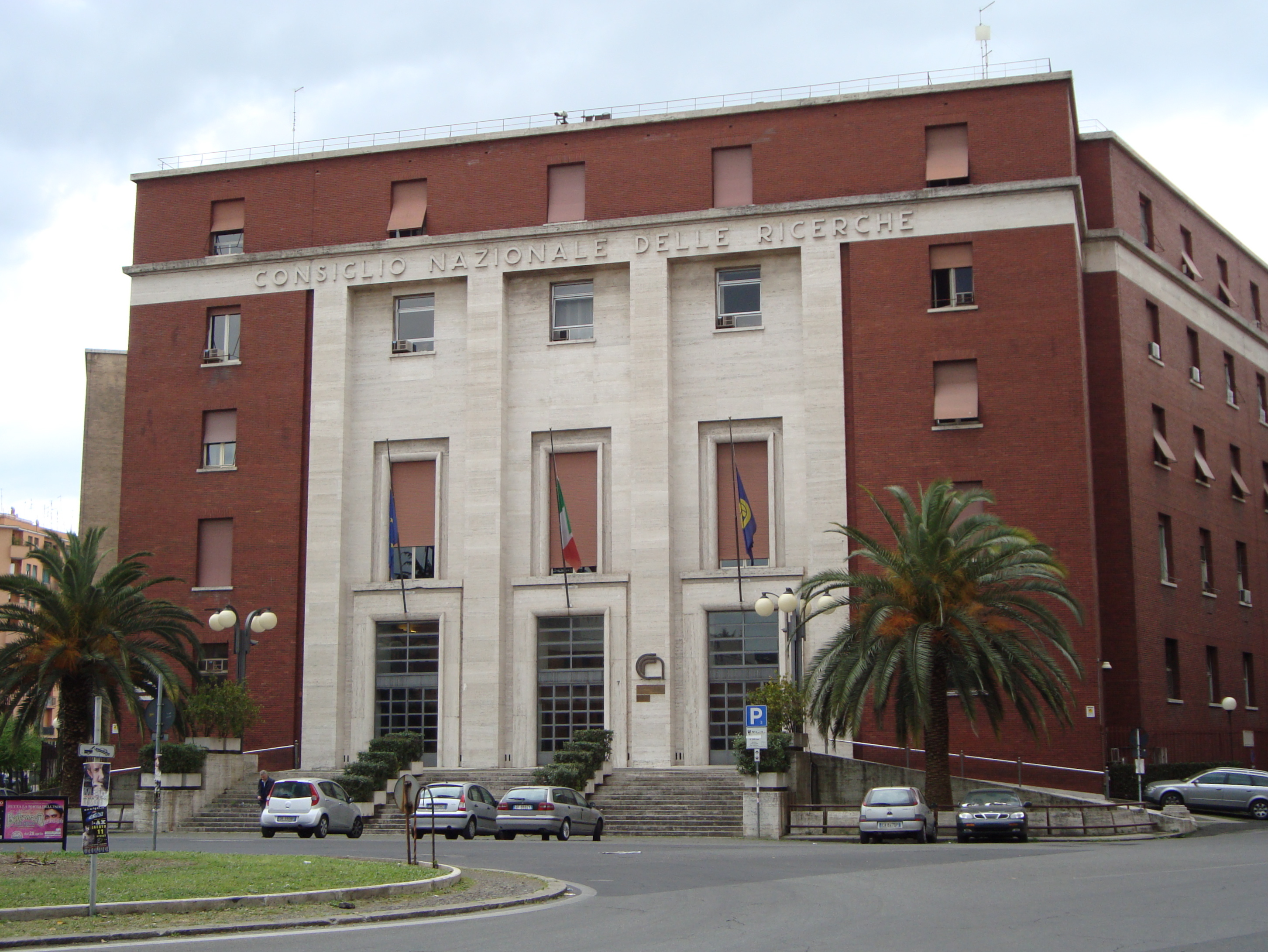
CNR headquarters in Rome

The institution was founded in 1923. The first president was Vito Volterra, succeeded by Guglielmo Marconi. The process of improvement of the national scientific research, through the use of specific laws, (see Law 59/1997), affects many research organisations, and amongst them is CNR, whose "primary function is to carry on, through its own organs, advanced basic and applied research, both to develop and maintain its own scientific competitiveness, and to be ready to take part effectively in a timely manner in the strategic fields defined by the national planning system".

On 23 December 1987, CNR registered the first Italian domain, “cnuce.cnr.it”, and thus the register of Italian Internet names – .it Registry – was established. As to 2026, the register is still managed by the CNR’s Institute of Informatics and Telematics in Pisa.

== Reorganisation ==
The national decree of 4 June 2003, n.127, named "The reorganisation of the National Research Council" confirmed the central role of CNR in the Italian research system. The main change introduced by the measure was the redefinition of institutional governance and a significant simplification of the operational structure, aimed at strengthening integration with the production sector and the international system.

CNR has the legal status of a public organisation, and defines for itself autonomous rules and regulations, in accordance with the existing laws and the Civil Code.

== Departments and research institutes ==
CNR is organised in seven departments and 83 research institutes:

=== Departments ===
- Biology, agriculture and food sciences
- Biomedical sciences
- Chemical sciences and materials technology
- Earth system science and environmental technologies
- Engineering, ICT and technologies for energy and transportation
- Physical sciences and technologies of matter
- Social sciences and humanities, cultural heritage

=== Research areas ===
The "research areas" of CNR are regional centres aggregating institutions where some services are managed in a centralised manner. Conceived in 1979, the implementation phase began in the mid-eighties with the creation of the first four areas; Montelibretti, Milan, Genoa and Potenza.

== Notable members ==
- Daniele Archibugi
- Andrea Boattini
- Luigi Broglio
- Eduardo Caianiello
- Guido Caldarelli
- Cristiano Castelfranchi
- Guido Castelnuovo
- Gustavo Colonnetti (former president)
- Angioletta Coradini
- Rosaria Conte
- Mauro Cristofani
- Oscar D'Agostino
- Roberto de Mattei (vice-president since 2004)
- Francesco Dieli
- Luciano Fadiga
- Rita Levi-Montalcini
- Paolo Malanima
- Luigi Nicolais
- Stefano Nolfi
- Fabio Paternò
- Luciano Pietronero
- Giorgio Sirilli
- Sauro Succi
- Cinzia Verde

== See also ==
- Istituto di Scienza e Tecnologie dell'Informazione – Institute of Information Science and Technologies (ISTI)
- Istituto per la Protezione delle Piante – Institute of Plant Protection
- Institute for Chemical-Physical Processes
