= Cristiano Castelfranchi =

Cristiano Castelfranchi (born 1944 in Rome) is an Associate Researcher at the Institute of Psychology of the Italian National Research Council. He teaches Cognitive Psychology and Artificial Intelligence at the University of Siena. In 2003, he was made a fellow at the European Coordinating Committee for Artificial Intelligence for pioneering work in Artificial Intelligence.

His research topic include:

- autonomy and goal-oriented behavior, with an emphasis on anticipatory action-control
- cognitive agent theory and architecture, with special focus on goals and their dynamics
- cognitive foundations of social phenomena (trust, power, cooperation, norms, institutions, etc.)
- cognitive approach to communication (semantics and pragmatics)
- social cognition and emotions, with an emphasis on the cognitive anatomy of complex emotional states
- multi-agent systems and social simulation, integrating cognitive, social and computer science

== Selected works ==
Books

- Trust Theory: A Socio-Cognitive and Computational Model (with Rino Falcone). 2010.
- Cognitive and social action (with Rosaria Conte). 1995. London University College of London Press.
- Artificial Social Systems (with Eric Werner). 1994. Springer Verlag.
