= Bunny Industries v FSW Enterprises =

Bunny Industries Ltd v FSW Enterprises
- Court: Supreme Court of Queensland
- Full case name: Bunny Industries Ltd v FSW Enterprises Pty Ltd
- Decided: 28 July 1982
- Citation: [1982] Qd R 712

Court membership
- Judges sitting: Andrews SPJ, Connolly, ThomasJJ

Case opinions
- judgement for the plaintiff 'That a vendor, who had dealt with land of which he was trustee for the purchaser, was accountable to the purchaser for his dealings with it, the purchaser being debited with any balance of purchase moneys due by him' (per Connolly J) concurring (Andrews SPJ) (Thomas J)

Bunny Industries v FSW Enterprises (also known as 'Bunny Industries') is a decision of the Supreme Court of Queensland.

It is an important case in Australian law regarding property, equity, and trusts. It is an authority for the role of equity and constructive trusts in contracts for the sale of land.

== Factual background ==
The plaintiff had entered into a contract to purchase land from the defendant. Four months later, the defendant decided to sell the land to a bona-fide purchaser for value without notice, collecting at least (and presumably more than) as much money from the bona fide purchaser than the original contract price with the plaintiff. The contract with the bona-fide purchaser was performed, and the purchaser was registered as the proprietor of the land under the Torrens system.

The plaintiff sought a declaration from the court that the defendant held the proceeds of sale with the third party, on trust for the plaintiff; and equitable relief in the form of an order that the plaintiff be paid the proceeds of that sale.

== Decision ==
The court held that upon execution of the contract by the plaintiff; the plaintiff had acquired an equitable fee simple in the property. The defendant then therefore became a constructive trustee of the legal fee simple, to the benefit of the purchaser. The vendor was then prevented under equity from transferring the legal estate to a third party; because in equity the property had already been transferred to the purchaser.

As the vendor was 'accountable' to the purchaser as trustee; the purchaser was entitled with all money that the vendor had received in sale to the bona-fide purchaser.

However, that remedy was contingent upon trustee principles being found to apply to the case. The court held that trustee principles could only apply if a court of equity would grant specific performance of the contract. Specific performance was impossible at the time of the hearing, as a bona-fide purchaser had already acquired legal title in the land.

Nevertheless, this was resolved by the court finding that questions about a breach of trust; are to be tested at the time of the relevant breach of trust. The court held the breach of trust had occurred at the moment of entry by the defendant into the second contract, and when that contract was completed. The defendant was therefore liable to the account of profits remedy, and was forced to transfer the full amount paid by the bona fide purchaser for the land to the plaintiff.

The court relied heavily upon the UK decision of Shaw v Foster, delivered by Lord Chelmsford, Lord Cairns, and Lord O'Hagan.

== See also ==
- Australian property law
- English trust law
- Equity (law)
- Law of Australia
