= Tract index =

A tract index is a document which summarizes real property transactions in certain U.S. states and may be available in the offices of Recorder of deeds.

== Layout and content ==
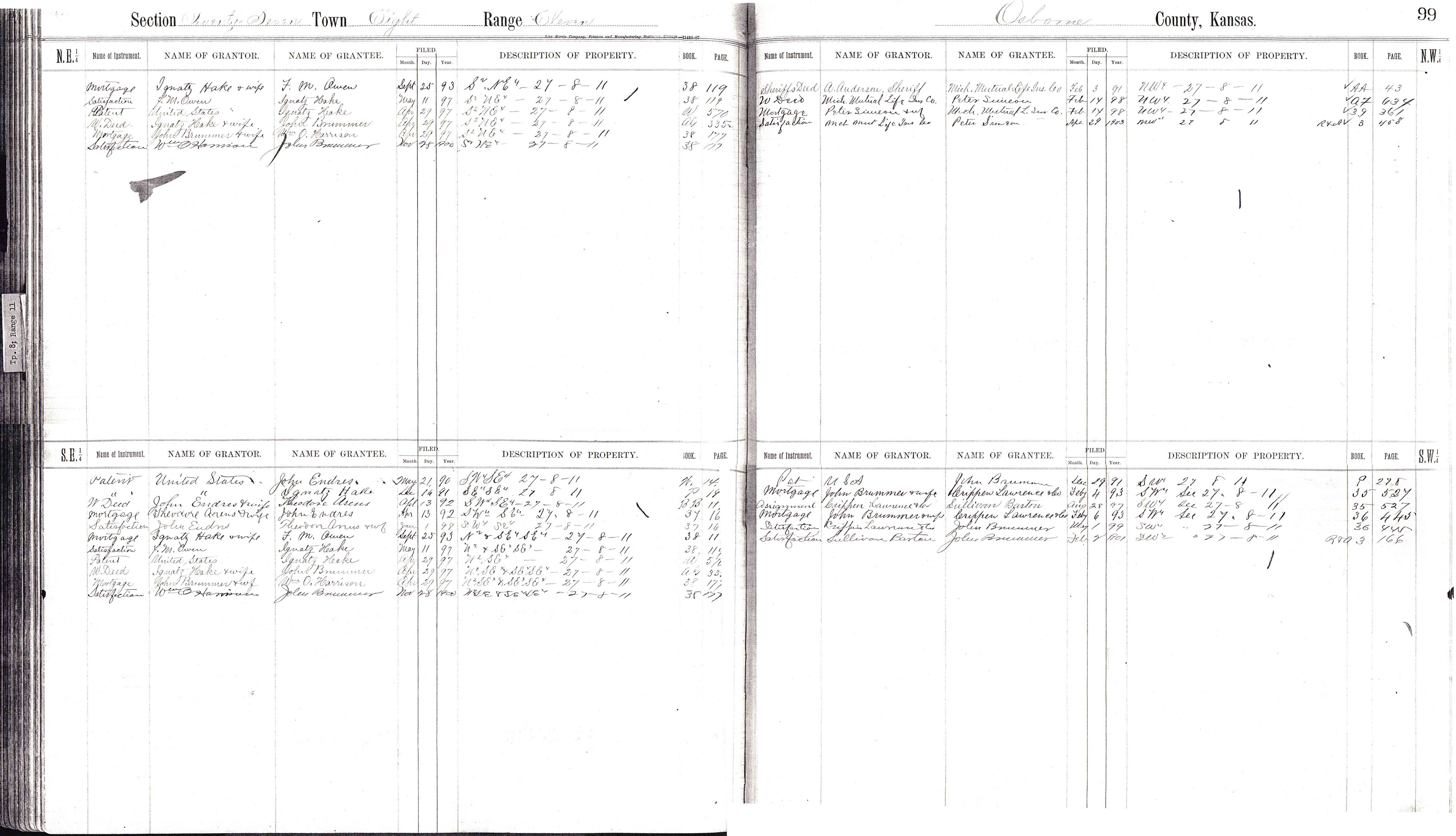
Example of a section index page

The information is organized by section, with a section relating to one square mile. Each section is presented in a two-page representation, usually by presenting the northwest quarter-section as the top half of the left page. The other quarter-sections are placed in map relationship to the northwest. In each quarter-section area, all transfers are listed in chronological order, often regardless of any subdivisions of the quarter-section. Each entry includes several cross-reference details, such as the names of the grantor (seller) and grantee (purchaser), the description of the parcel, the volume and page of the Deed books, the date, and other identifying characteristics of the transfer (for example, the type of deed).

Typically, when one quarter-section fills with its listings of transactions, a new set of pages is begun in the same volume or a later volume, so that all transactions in a period are found in the same volume. The number of sections within a jurisdiction dictates how many volumes are needed for a single period.

In comparison to the atlas (also called a plat map or cadastral map), which is a graphic representation of land ownership in a township for the date of publication, the tract index is relatively dynamic. However, the most accurate information results from use of the tract index together with the grantor-grantee index and the recorded deeds or mortgages themselves.

== Availability ==
Only a few states require their recording offices to maintain this type of index. Among these states are Nebraska, North Dakota, Oklahoma, South Dakota, Utah and Wyoming. In addition, some other states permit recording offices to maintain tract indexes (for example, Kansas, Minnesota, Montana, Ohio, and Wisconsin).

== See also ==
- Land registration
- Deeds registration
- Deed
- Mortgage law
- Grantor
- Grantor-grantee index
- Recording (real estate)
