= Australian property law =

Laws regulating property rights and land ownership in Australia

Australian property law, or property law in Australia, are laws that regulate and prioritise the rights, interests and responsibilities of individuals in relation to "things" (property). These things are forms of "property" or "rights" to possession or ownership of an object. Property law orders or prioritises rights and classifies property as either real and tangible, such as land, or intangible, such as the right of an author to their literary works, or personal but tangible, such as a book or a pencil. The scope of what constitutes a thing capable of being classified as property, and when an individual or body corporate gains priority of interest over a thing, has in legal scholarship been heavily debated on a philosophical level.

== Land law ==
Land is the predominant focus of Western property law, including Australian property law. Legal developments in this field outweigh the development of other forms of property law, primarily due to the high value of land in comparison to other forms of property, such as chattels.

Each state in Australia has a different regime for the regulation and bureaucratisation of land. Property law is largely statute-based but continues in important aspects to be influenced by the common law and principles that originate from Australia's history as a British colony, where land and estate law developed through the ambit of feudalism.

Property law is enabling in that it creates a system for evidencing, recognising and transferring title to land, facilitating its use as an economic instrument. Other legal instruments in property law that facilitate the private and commercial dealing of land include the mortgage, lease, covenant and easement.

=== Torrens title ===
All Australian colonies (now states and territories) adopted the Torrens system of land registration of title between 1858 and 1875. The Torrens system was introduced first in South Australia by Sir Robert Richard Torrens, the Registrar-General of Deeds, through the Real Property Act 1858. Victoria adopted the system with the Real Property Act 1862, and New South Wales with the commencement of the Real Property Act 1862 on 1 January 1863.

Most land in Australia is now held under the Torrens system, although remnants of the old system of land title still remain, called "general law land". All land in the Australian Capital Territory is leasehold (effectively Torrens freehold), and much of the Northern Territory is held under Crown lease. Native title is now recognised as a form of land ownership. Some land remains as Crown land (i.e. in Australia, public land).

In accordance with the principles of the Torrens system, each jurisdiction maintains a register of land titles of land in the jurisdiction that has been registered under the system. The register also shows the proprietor (owner) of the land. This system was devised to reduce the amount of fraud relating to land due to falsification of title deeds. It does so with "ownership" of the land being confirmed only upon registration of the property. That is, "it is not a system of registration of title but a system of title by registration". This gives a purchaser "greater assurance, indeed certainty, of title". The principle of "indefeasibility" of title - where a right has been entered on the register, it cannot be defeated by later rights except in certain circumstances - further protects the Torrens title holder.

The Torrens system also provides for registration of other entitlements to land such as a mortgage, by which land is used to secure a loan.

=== Strata title ===
Strata title is a form of ownership devised for multi-level apartment buildings and horizontal subdivisions with shared areas. Under strata title, individual lot owners hold title to the space within their lot, while the building structure and common areas are owned collectively through an Owners Corporation (also called a body corporate in some states), which levies fees on lot owners to fund maintenance and insurance of common property. Strata title legislation was first introduced in New South Wales through the Conveyancing (Strata Titles) Act 1961, which commenced on 1 July 1961. The first strata plan registered anywhere in the world was for a block of 18 units at Burwood, Sydney, approved on 28 July 1961. Other states and territories subsequently enacted their own legislation: Tasmania in 1962, Queensland in 1965, Western Australia and Victoria in 1967, the Australian Capital Territory in 1970, and the Northern Territory in 1974. Strata title is the predominant title structure for apartment and unit ownership in Australia, and the model has since been adopted in various forms by numerous countries including Canada, New Zealand, Singapore, and the United Arab Emirates.

== Main property codes ==
The main legislation in each Australian jurisdiction regulating interests in land law in relation to property (negotiable instruments) and the scheme of registration (title) are:

State or Territory of Australia	Legislation regarding property	Legislation regarding Title
New South Wales	Real Property Act 1900	Conveyancing Act 1919
Victoria	Property Law Act 1958	Sale of Land Act 1962
Australian Capital Territory	Civil Law (Property) Act 2006	Civil Law (Sale of Residential Property) Act 2003
Queensland	Property Law Act 2023	Land Title Act 1994
Northern Territory	Law of Property Act	Land Title Act
South Australia	Law of Property Act 1936	Real Property Act 1886
Tasmania	Conveyancing and Law of Property Act 1884	Land Titles Act 1980
Western Australia	Property Law Act 1969	Transfer of Land Act 1893

== Goods and chattels ==
Australia's law in relation to goods and chattels (items which are not land or intellectual property) follows that of the United Kingdom.

== Intellectual property ==
Australia follows the English traditions for intellectual property, and is a signatory of the Berne Convention for the Protection of Literary and Artistic Works and operates a system of automatic copyright. Other areas of Australian intellectual property include patents, designs and Plant breeders' rights.

== See also ==
- Torrens title (land registration and land transfer system)
