= Efstratiou v Glantschnig =

1972 New Zealand legal case

- Court: Court of Appeal of New Zealand
- Full case name: Efstratiou, Glantschnig, and Petrovic v. Glantschnig
- Decided: 1972
- Citation: [1972] NZLR 594

Keywords
- indefeasible title, fraud

Efstratiou v Glantschnig (1972) is an often cited New Zealand case to the limits of indefeasibility of title to land ownership, where in this case, (unlike in Frazer v Walker and Boyd v Mayor of Wellington) the purchaser of the land was aware of the title fraud at the time of the purchase of the property.

== Background ==
Mr H and Mrs Christine Glantschnig had a turbulent relationship.

Originally married in Austria in 1955, they later moved to New Zealand in 1956. In that same year they purchased their matrimonial house at 62 Wallace Street, Wellington for the sum of $3,900, with the wife paying half the deposit of $1,000.

However, despite her paying half the deposit, only the husband was listed on the property title as the registered owner. However, this still gave her an equitable ownership to the property.

In 1958 the couple briefly separated, and the husband agreed to a settlement agreement in which he acknowledged he owed his wife half the deposit for the house. The couple soon reconciled.

In 1968 the wife lent the husband $1,000 for a trip back to Austria for what has been described as an indefinite stay. In his absence, the wife took in a boarder, only referred to as "K".

When the husband finally returned to his wife unexpectedly on 20 April, he discovered that his wife and the boarder "K" were living together in a marriage-like relationship.

In the ensuing argument, the wife walked out of the house, taking their two children with her. The following day, 21 April, the wife obtained, and had served on her husband, an interim injunction prohibiting him from returning to the house.

Not happy with these developments, on the following day 22 April, the husband showed the injunction to a Mr Petrovic, a real estate agent, and instructed him to sell the house, and the agent arranged a sale of the house for $5,000, substantially below its valuation of $8,000, the same day, with the settlement date being only three days later on 25 April.

Even then, the purchaser settled the sale the following day, on 23 April, which was legally two days early than required, and the title transfer was done first thing the following day at 9.30am on 24 April.

Mrs Glantschnig was then forced to file a motion for the purchase to be set aside, and also added her ex-husband and the real estate agent Mr Petrovic, who was aware of the scheme to defraud, to the proceedings.

The purchaser, Mr Efstratiou claimed he had indefeasible title.

== Held ==
The Court of Appeal of New Zealand ruled that due to amongst other things, the great speed of the sale (less than 24 hours after listing), that it was sold for only 63% of the market price, and the transaction was stamped and registered the very day after settlement, that the purchaser was aware of the wife's equitable interest in the property (albeit unregistered) and that the sale was registered through fraud, that accordingly, the purchaser did not have indefeasible title and the sale was set aside. However the court vacated the wife's previous award of damages for $3,000 and awarded her legal costs of only $300.
