= Frazer v Walker =

1966 Judicial Committee of the Privy Council case

- Court: Judicial Committee of the Privy Council
- Full case name: Alan Frederick Frazer v Douglas Hamilton Walker and Others
- Decided: 7 December 1966
- Citations: [1966] UKPC 27; [1967] 1 AC 569; [1967] 1 All ER 649
- Transcript: PC judgment

Court membership
- Judges sitting: Viscount Dilhorne, Lord Denning, Lord Hodson, Lord Wilberforce, Sir Garfield Barwick

Keywords
- Fraud, indefeasibility of title

Frazer v Walker [1967] 1 AC 569 is a landmark New Zealand court case that went to the Privy Council on appeal. The case upheld the concept that an owner of interest in land which was originally obtained from the rightful owner through fraud, still obtains an indefeasible interest in that title if they were unaware of the fraud.

The case also provided a succinct definition of "indefeasibility of title" as it appears in common law and the Torrens title land registration system. Specifically, it is the "immunity from attack by adverse claim to the land or interest in respect of which he is registered, which a registered proprietor enjoys".

== Background ==
Mr Alan Frederick Frazer and his wife Flora Agnes Frazer, jointly were the registered owners of a dairy farm in New Zealand under the Land Transfer Act [1952]. In 1961 Mrs Frazer borrowed £3,000 ($121,214 in 2011 dollars) from Mr and Mrs Radomski using the jointly owned property as security for the loan without her husband's knowledge or consent.

For the mortgage to be legally valid for a jointly owned property, the mortgage contract needed both owners' signatures (and for them to be witnessed). Mrs Frazer forged her husband's signature (without his knowledge) and persuaded the solicitors' own law clerk to falsely witness the forged signature of Mr Frazer. Mrs Frazer then paid off the existing mortgage on the house, leaving a certain sum of money for herself.

To further complicate matters, Mrs Frazer made no repayments on the new mortgage, resulting in the Radomski's selling the farm in the following year for £5,000 at a mortgagee sale to Mr Walker, who was totally unaware of the defect in the title to the farm (as were the Radomskis).

On 29 November 1962, Mr Walker was duly registered as the new legal owner of the farm on the property title.

After the farm was sold however, Mr Frazer refused to recognise Mr Walker's claim to legal ownership to the farm, leaving Mr Walker having to file an action for possession of the farm with the courts.

== Held ==
Mr Walker's claim was upheld by both the High Court and the Court of Appeal of New Zealand. The Frazers appealed his claim to ownership to the farm to the Privy Council, where the earlier decisions were upheld. The Privy Council ruled that while the legal interest in the land may have been originally obtained by fraud, because Mr Walker was unaware of any fraud at the time of purchase (a bona fide purchaser for value without notice, under section 183 of the Land Transfer Act), meant that he had indefeasible title to the farm.

In a wider sense, this case is important due to its affirmation of the immediate nature of indefeasible title under section 62 of the New Zealand Land Transfer Act 1952, following Boyd v Mayor of Wellington.

== See also ==
- Breskvar v Wall, which affirmed this case in Australia.
