= Breskvar v Wall =

Judgement of the High Court of Australia

- Court: High Court of Australia
- Decided: 13 December 1971
- Citations: [1971] HCA 70, (1971) 126 CLR 376

Case history
- Prior actions: Breskvar v Wall [1972] Qd R 28
- Appealed from: Supreme Court (Qld)
- Subsequent actions: Breskvar v White [1978] Qd R 187

Court membership
- Judges sitting: Barwick CJ, McTiernan, Menzies, Windeyer, Owen, Walsh and Gibbs JJ

Case opinions
- 7:0

Keywords
- fraud, indefeasibility of title

Breskvar v Wall, was an Australian court case, decided in the High Court on 13 December 1971. The case was an influential decision in property law, specifically the effect of obtaining title by registration under the Torrens title system, the application of the fraud exception to the principle of indefeasibility and whether Frazer v Walker should be followed in Australia. The High Court followed Frazer v Walker in upholding that a bona fide purchaser for value without notice of the fraud obtained an effective title even though the person they purchased from was registered by fraud against the original owner.

The case is best known for the succinct description of the Torrens system of registered title by Chief Justice Garfield Barwick that it "is not a system of registration of title but a system of title by registration".

== Facts ==
Essentially this was a contest between two innocent parties, the Breskvars and Alban Pty Ltd in relation to the ownership of a two acre block of land at Acacia Ridge, Brisbane, each of who were victims of fraud by Petrie and Wall. Whoever succeeded would be the owner of the land, while the other party would be left to recovering damages against Petrie and Wall. Emilie & Franc Breskvar were the registered owners of the land. They took a loan of $1,200 from Petrie and gave Petrie the title documents and transfer papers as collateral. Petrie fraudulently inserted the name of his grandson G.W. Wall onto transfer papers and had it registered with Titles Office. Petrie, on behalf of Wall sold the property for $3,500 to Alban Pty Ltd who were unaware of the fraud. The Breskvars were trying to sell the land and discovered that Wall had been registered on the title and lodged a caveat in an attempt to prevent the property from being sold. The caveat was lodged after the sale to Alban Pty Ltd had been completed, but before the transfer had been registered.

== Trial ==
At the time, there were two approaches to indefeasibility of title under the Torrens system. The prevailing view, known as the theory of deferred indefeasibility, was that title only became indefeasible on the registration of a subsequent transfer to a bona fide purchaser for value. Under the deferred theory, because Alban Pty Ltd was not registered, Wall's title could be set aside for fraud. The Breskvars argument was, in effect, that Wall never had title to the property and so could pass no title to Alban Pty Ltd. This was because the transfer to Wall was fraudulent and because Wall's name was not on the transfer at the time of signing and so the transfer was void under the Stamp Act 1894 (Qld). The deferred theory had been rejected by the Privy Council in Frazer v Walker. If the Breskvars failed in their challenge to the registration, then the issue was whether their equitable interest in the land should be given priority over the equitable interest of Alban Pty Ltd, as a bona fide purchaser for value. The difficulty with the Breskvars claim in this respect was that they had enabled the fraud by signing a blank transfer of the property.

In the Supreme Court of Queensland Justice Graham Hart followed Frazer v Walker and held that Alban Pty Ltd was a bona fide purchaser for value without notice of the fraud and were entitled to be registered as the owners of the land. The Breskvars were awarded damages against Petrie and Wall and were required to pay the legal costs of Alban Pty Ltd. The Breskvars could recover those costs from Petrie and Wall, if they were able to pay.

The Breskvars appealed directly to the High Court. While Petrie and Wall had appeared in the Supreme Court, they did not appear in the High Court.

== Judgment ==
=== Chief Justice Barwick ===
The leading judgment was delivered by Chief Justice Garfield Barwick with whom justices Victor Windeyer, William Owen and Harry Gibbs agreed.

- 'a registration which results from a void instrument is effective according to the terms of the registration. It matters not what the cause or reason for which the instrument is void'.
- 'a right to sue to recover the land ... is an equitable claim'
- Before the equitable claim was made, bona fide purchaser for value without notice intervened, giving 3rd party an equitable interest in land.
- 'The priority of the creation of that right will only be lost by some conduct on the part of the [plaintiffs] which must have contributed to the assumption, false as the event proved, upon which the holder of the competition equity acted when that equity was created. Here the appellants armed the [2nd Def] with the means of placing himself … on the register'.
- Barwick CJ, agreed with Supreme Court ruling that by reason of Breskvars (Plaintiff) conduct in providing the means of transfer to G.P. Wall (2nd Def), their equity though prior in time was postponed to the equitable interest of the 3rd party bona fide purchaser for value and without notice.

=== Justice McTiernan ===
- 'In my judgment the decision of the Privy Council in Frazer v Walker requires the conclusion that Wall's certificate of title was good against all the world, except of course the defrauded Breskvars'.
- 'When the transfer which the appellants had given to Petrie [2nd Def] was completed with the name of Wall as purchaser it operated, in my judgment, as a representation, addressed to any person who might take it without notice of the appellants' rights, that Wall had an estate in the land which he was entitled to transfer in his turn'.
- 'Apart from priority in time, the test for ascertaining which incumbrancer has the better equity must be whether either has been guilty of some act or default which prejudices his claim'.
- '[T]he interest of Alban [3rd Def] should be accorded paramountcy'.

=== Justice Menzies ===
- 'The appellants can, I have no doubt, displace Wall's title. To succeed, however, at the expense of Alban Pty. Ltd., they must go further than they have to go against Wall. They must show either that Wall had no title at all, or, that their claim is to be preferred to that of Alban Pty. Ltd'.
- 'Frazer v Walker was not a case of conflict between unregistered interests'.
- 'It must now be recognized that, in the absence of fraud on the part of a transferee, or some other statutory ground of exception, an indefeasible title can be acquired by virtue of a void transfer. It seems to me to follow that, where there is fraud or one of the other statutory exceptions to indefeasibility, a transferee does, by registration of a void transfer, obtain a defeasible title'.
- Contrast to 'Gibbs v Messer where, as the Privy Council has explained, there was no real registered proprietor at all but only a fictitious person'.
- 'The authorities already cited establish that the appellants' right or claim should, in the absence of a good ground for distinguishing them, be postponed and it becomes necessary to determine whether The Stamp Acts, s 53(5), affords any such ground for distinction'.
- 'What [section 53(5) of the Stamp Acts] says is that no transfer signed in blank “shall be valid either in law or in equity”'.
- 'Nevertheless, in executing the transfer in blank they were in breach of The Stamp Acts, s 53(5), and it was [the Breskvars'] breach of the law that enabled Wall in disregard of the section, to become registered as proprietor'.

=== Justice Walsh ===
- If Breskvars had taken action before the 3rd party, then they would have been able to get it back despite Wall's registration of title.
- '[W]hen the transfer was registered then, ... “the registration of Wall as the registered proprietor was effective to vest the title in him and to divest the title of the plaintiffs”'.
- 'The appellants placed in the hands of Wall a memorandum of transfer in a form which enabled him to complete it in such a way as to make it appear to be a valid absolute transfer of the appellants' estate. They allowed Petrie to have possession of the certificate of title. Thus they enabled Petrie to procure the registration of Wall as the owner of an estate in fee simple'.
- 'These acts of the appellants, coupled with their failure at the relevant time to place upon the register any notice of any interest retained by them in the land, enabled Wall and his agent Petrie to represent to an intending purchaser that Wall had an unencumbered estate in fee simple in the land'.
- 'In this respect their conduct was precisely the same as the conduct described in Abigail v Lapin, which was held to postpone the equity of the person who by that conduct enabled a representation to be made upon the faith of which another person acquired an equitable interest.

== Aftermath ==
The Breskvars appeal was dismissed and they were required to pay the legal costs of the appeal. Professor Peter Butt states that the effect of Breskvar v Wall was that:

Title under the Torrens system derives from Registrar-General's act in registering an instrument - the act of a statutory official acting under statutory authority - not from the parties' act in executing the instrument. ... Registration is the source of title - it confers on the person registered as proprietor a title that did not previously exist. ... The conclusiveness of the Register confers on the registered proprietor of an interest in Torrens title land an 'indefeasible title' to that interest. By an 'indefeasible title' to an interest is meant a title that cannot be set aside on the ground of a defect existing in the title before the interest was registered.

The Breskvars sought to recover the money against Petrie and Wall. When this proved unsuccessful they sought compensation from the assurance fund under s 127 of the Real Property Act 1861-1976 (Qld). A claim under this section had to be made within six years. The Breskvars argued that the six years ran from when the judgment was unsatisfied. Justice Peter Connolly rejected their claim, holding that the six years ran from when the Breskvars were deprived of their land in 1968, noting that "In many cases a plaintiff under s. 126 would have no way of knowing that the defendant might prove to be insolvent when after litigating his claim and possibly conducting an appeal or appeals he ultimately came to execute his judgment. ... This means that for him the six-year period of limitation is really illusory".
