= Formalities =

A formality is a customary or official procedure. In law, it is a requirement for obtaining a legal status.

Formalities may also refer to:

Law

- Formalities in English law
- Copyright formalities, legal requirements for obtaining copyright in a jurisdiction

Mass media

- "Formalities" (CSI), seventh episode of the fifth season of CSI: Crime Scene Investigation, a US TV series
- Formalities (album), 2010 album by US alternative rock band The Spill Canvas
