= Recording (real estate) =

System of documenting land titles and interests in a public register

The vast majority of states in the United States employ a system of recording legal instruments (otherwise known as deeds registration) that affect the title of real estate as the exclusive means for publicly documenting land titles and interests. The record title system differs significantly from land registration systems, such as the Torrens system, that have been adopted in a few states. The principal difference is that the recording system does not determine who owns the title or interest involved, which is ultimately established through litigation in the courts. The system provides a framework for determining who the law will protect in relation to those titles and interests when a dispute arises.

== Creation ==
The recording systems are established by state statute. They usually provide for the office of a recorder in each county or other jurisdiction. The names of these offices are usually the "Recorder of Deeds" or something similar. State statutes also prescribe the following elements:

1. What instruments are entitled to be recorded, usually deeds, mortgages (whether or not in the form of deeds of trust), leases (usually longer term varieties), easements, and court orders. There is generally added to these a catch-all category of "other instruments affecting the title to real estate". These statutes also list technical requirements, such as whether acknowledgements before a notary public are required (the great majority) or witnesses must also sign the document (rarer).
2. The effect of failure to record. This is usually stated: Deeds (etc.) that are not recorded are void as against purchasers for valuable consideration without knowledge of their existence.
3. The procedure for indexing instruments presented for recording.
  - Grantor-grantee indices. Overwhelmingly, this is the creation of an index based on the names of the grantors (the persons conveying the interest) and of the grantees (those receiving the interest). This is called the grantor-grantee index. Also included are the dates the instruments are recorded. Many, if not most, such systems keep separate indexes for deeds and mortgages. There are also systems for indexing judgment liens in which the judgment debtor and the judgment creditor are listed in the same way as grantors and grantees, respectively.
  - Tract indices. A few state laws require the creation of a tract index. This requires the employees in the recorder's office to make a determination of which property is affected by the instrument and to index it by the legal description of that property. This is not widely practiced because of the increased cost, the greater probability of error and, possibly, the abstractors' and title insurers' lobbies in the legislatures. (Abstractors and title insurers have spent vast amounts of money creating "title plants" that reindex the recorded documents according to the tracts they affect for greater efficiency in title searching.)

== Title searching ==
=== Grantor/grantee ===
A grantor/grantee title search attempts to locate records by searching the parties listed on a recorded instrument. One approach to conducting a full grantor/grantee title search starts by searching the grantor index in the County records and determining the name of the first recorded owner of title. This is usually the sovereign, which is the federal government or the Crown of the nation which owned a former colony now located within the United States. The search finds the grant from the sovereign to the first grantee. This is usually in the form of a patent. Then, the grantee's name is searched in the grantor index to find the deed by which it has subsequently conveyed the title, and so forth until no more grants are found. Liens or encumbrances granted by any of the parties shown on recorded instruments are also found in the search. Though theoretically accurate, this approach has practical difficulties due to there often being numerous grants from the sovereign. Therefore, an alternative method is to reverse the process, i.e. to search backward in the grantee index. This is done by beginning with the name of the person or entity who is thought to own the land to find the grantor to it. Then the grantee index is searched again to find the source of that grantor's title, and so on until you reach the grant from the sovereign. These linkages from grantor to grantee are called the "chain of title". The last grantee found is the "record title holder".

=== Geographic index ===
In municipalities with a large population and states that do not support tract indices, the Grantor/Grantee method can be time-consuming and difficult altogether due to common names within the index. In these municipalities, a geographic index is often created to aid in title searching. In this system, each document is posted in both a Grantor and Grantee index in addition to being posted to indexes describing attributes of the property's location such as a lot number, subdivision name or Parcel Identification Number (PIN). With a functioning geographic index, a search can be done with a combination of a grantor/grantee, legal description or PIN search.

== How the system works ==
The record title holder is not necessarily the actual owner of the land if there are previous unrecorded deeds to it to others. The principal legal theory is that once a person has conveyed the title to their property (or some aspect of it) to someone, he or she has nothing left to transfer to any subsequent person. However, as a result of the various state recording acts, the courts will protect a bona fide purchaser who pays valuable consideration and does not have knowledge of the prior unrecorded deed from the claims of a prior grantee under that deed. The same is true respecting most types of unrecorded liens or encumbrances. For example, purchasers of the land from the record title holder who pay valuable consideration and have no knowledge of unrecorded mortgages will be protected against those mortgages by the courts. All of this flows from the statement in most recording statutes that the unrecorded instruments are void against such purchasers. Also, U.S. law permits the bankruptcy trustee of a debtor to set aside property interests the debtor has conveyed if a bona fide purchaser of the real estate, who properly perfected its interest, would be protected against the conveyance. Therefore, it behooves purchasers and mortgage lenders to record their deeds or mortgages, respectively, to prevent this outcome.

Once an instrument affecting the title to real estate has been recorded, the law holds that everyone is deemed to know of its existence, even if they have not searched the records in the recorder's office. This is the doctrine of "constructive notice" and it is nearly universal in the various states of the U.S. So, for example, after a deed or mortgage has been recorded by someone in the chain of title, no subsequent purchaser will be protected against it. The reason is that the recording laws deem everyone to know of its existence once it is recorded.

=== Effect of the recording act ===
Each U.S. state has a recording act, a statute which dictates the legal procedure by which an individual claiming an interest in real property (real estate) formally establishes their claim to that property. The recordation of property rights becomes particularly significant where an unscrupulous dealer in land purports to sell the same tract of land multiple times. With other kinds of property, the first buyer would be the owner of the property, and later owners would have no interest in the property and would instead have a cause of action against the original seller for fraud. With real property, however, the first buyer is not necessarily the owner, depending on the kind of statute under which the recording of such property interests operates. There are three basic kinds of statutory schemes in recording acts: race, notice, and race/notice.

Even though a recording act does not require recordation, the law does create strong incentive for a buyer to record. Recordation provides constructive notice to any subsequent purchasers that a prior conveyance occurred and therefore protects the prior purchaser in the event of a subsequent conveyance.

==== Race statutes ====
Under a race statute, whoever records first wins. Thus, if Oscar purports to sell a piece of land to Alice for $100,000, and the next day purports to sell exactly the same piece of land to Bob for another $100,000, then whichever of the two buyers is the first to reach the recording office and have the sale recorded will be deemed the owner of the property. Thus, if Bob is the first to record the conveyance, he will be the owner even if he knew about the prior conveyance to Alice. Race statutes are extremely rare because it is generally viewed as unfair to protect a party who had actual notice of a prior conveyance. Currently, Delaware, North Carolina, and Louisiana are the only jurisdictions where a race statute is in effect. The benefit of a pure race statute is that it encourages all grantees to record their interest quickly.

==== Notice statutes ====
Under a notice statute, a subsequent purchaser for value wins if, at the time of conveyance, that subsequent purchaser had no actual or constructive notice of the prior conveyance. In short, a subsequent bona fide purchaser wins. Thus, if Oscar purports to sell a piece of land to Alice for $100,000, and the next day purports to sell exactly the same piece of land to Bob for another $100,000, then Bob will own the land so long as he was not aware of the prior sale to Alice. However, note that if Alice records her interest before Bob's purchase, this recordation will be deemed to give Bob constructive notice. If Bob purchases the land without notice, and Alice then records her prior purchase before Bob records his own purchase, then Bob will still prevail in ownership of the land. The benefit of a pure notice statute is that it encourages Alice to record quickly, but if Alice records after Bob's purchase, Bob has only limited incentive to record his conveyance immediately. This can leave the land records incomplete for an indeterminate amount of time and could cause Alice to make improvements of which she might be divested by Bob's later recorded deed.

Currently, Alabama, Arizona, Connecticut, Florida, Illinois, Iowa, Kansas, Missouri, New Hampshire, New Mexico, Rhode Island, South Carolina, Tennessee, Texas, Vermont, and West Virginia are the jurisdictions where a notice statute is in effect.

==== Race/notice statutes ====
Under a race/notice statute, a subsequent purchaser for value wins if (1) at the time of conveyance, that subsequent purchaser had no actual or constructive notice of the prior conveyance, and (2) the subsequent purchaser records before the prior purchaser. In short, a subsequent purchaser in good faith wins only if he records before the prior purchaser does. In this type of system, if Oscar purports to sell a piece of land to Alice for $100,000, and the next day purports to sell exactly the same piece of land to Bob for another $100,000, then Bob will own the land only if he was not aware of the prior sale to Alice, and if Bob actually records his interest before Alice does. In the hybrid race/notice statute, all grantees have a strong incentive to record early, thereby making the land records complete.

Currently, Alaska, Arkansas, California, Colorado, District of Columbia, Georgia, Hawaii, Idaho, Indiana, Kentucky, Maine, Maryland, Massachusetts, Michigan, Minnesota, Mississippi, Montana, Nebraska, Nevada, New Jersey, New York, North Dakota, Ohio (regarding mortgages, Ohio follows the race statute), Oklahoma, Oregon, Pennsylvania (regarding mortgages, Pennsylvania follows Race), South Dakota, Utah, Washington, Wisconsin, and Wyoming are the jurisdictions where a race/notice statute is in effect.

== Limitations ==
As can be seen from above, there are limitations to the protection of most recording laws, some of which are noted below.

Those who pay no valuable consideration for their interest in the property are not protected against unrecorded interests. Examples are those getting the property as a gift and heirs. Also, those who purchase ownership interests in the owners of the property, such as shares of stock in a corporation owning the land, have not purchased an interest in the property itself and so are unprotected. Also, recording laws generally do not protect purchasers against real estate taxes because notice of them is usually not required to be recorded for them to be effective. Finally, certain classes of nongovernmental liens such as mechanic's liens are often made effective for a certain period of time even if they are unrecorded.

== See also ==
- Land registration
- Shelter rule
- Deeds registration
