= Shelter rule =

The shelter rule is a doctrine in the common law of property under which a grantee who has received an interest in property from a bona fide purchaser will also be protected as a bona fide purchaser, even if the grantee would not legally qualify for this status. The grantee is "sheltered" from other claims by the grantor's status as an actual bona fide purchaser.

This rule comes into play in situations under a number of circumstances. For example, where a bad actor agrees to convey the same real property to multiple other parties. For example, if Oscar conveys Blackacre by deed to Andrew on Monday; before Andrew records the conveyance, Oscar conveys Blackacre to Bob, who is a bona fide purchaser and who is unaware of Oscar's previous conveyance of the same property. Bob then conveys Blackacre to Charles, but before the conveyance, Andrew notifies Charles of the deed conveyed from Oscar to Andrew. Since Charles has notice of the prior conveyance, Charles does not qualify to be a bona fide purchaser. However, under the shelter rule, Charles will receive the same treatment as Bob, and will prevail over Andrew in a legal contest over the ownership of Blackacre.

The rule has several purposes. One is to allow a bona fide purchaser, who is entitled to hold and enjoy the property, to have a congruent entitlement to sell that property. Another is to prevent the use of the property from being held up in litigation.

There are two exceptions to the shelter rule:

1. Where the property is reconveyed by the good faith purchaser to an original grantor who had notice of an outstanding interest in the property.
2. Where the property is conveyed by the good faith purchaser to a person who had violated a trust or duty with respect to the property.

The shelter rule also applies to the transfer of negotiable instruments. If the recipient of a negotiable interest is a donee (that is, a person who receives by gift), that person would generally not have the rights of a holder in due course - that is, a person who received the instrument for value and without notice of other claims. However, if the gift was received from a qualifying holder in due course of the same instrument, the shelter rule gives the donee the right to recover on the instrument.
