= Recorder of deeds =

Office or position that maintains property ownership records

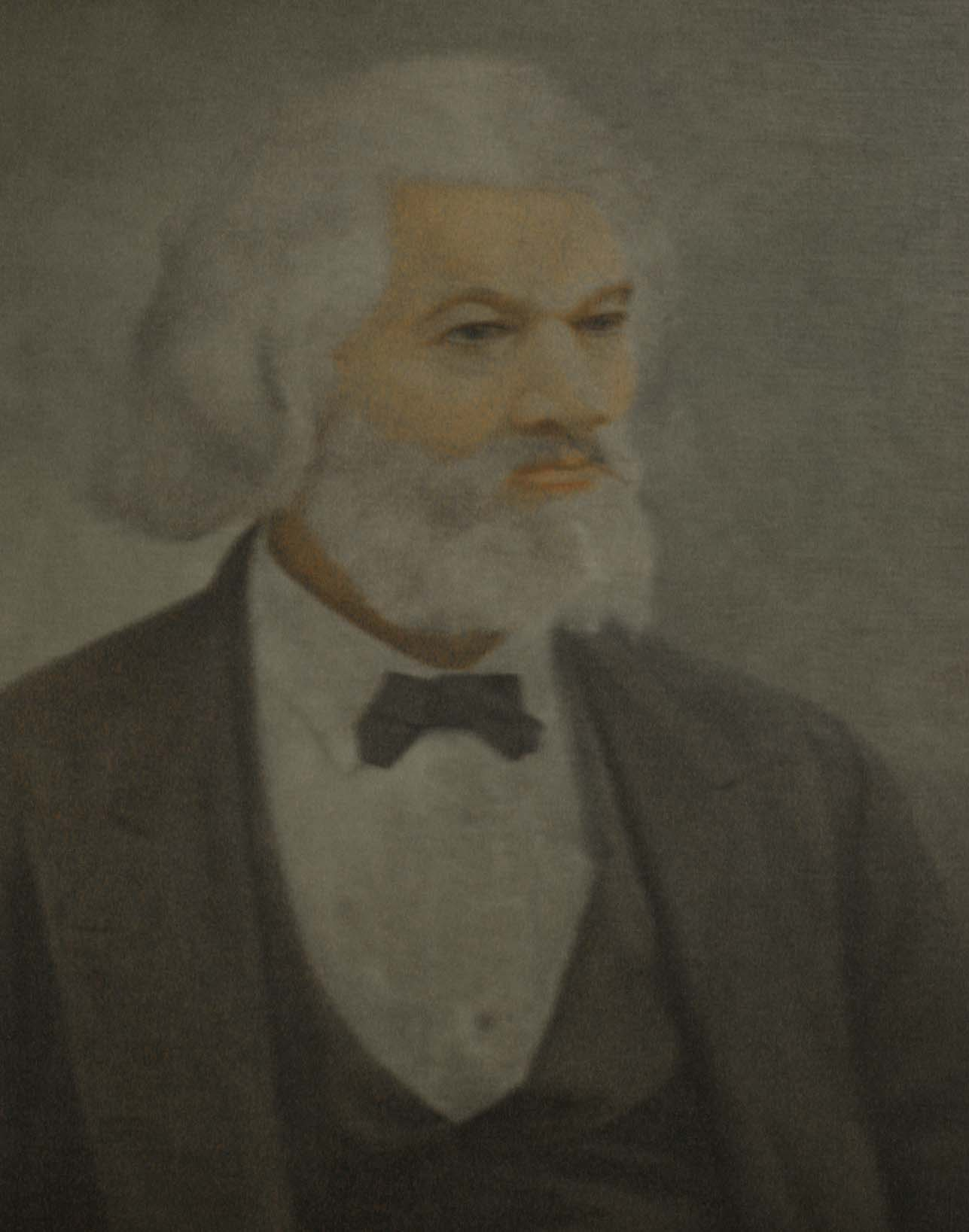
Portrait of Frederick Douglass in the D.C. Recorder of Deeds Building. Frederick Douglass was the first recorder of deeds for the District of Columbia.

Recorder of deeds or deeds registry is a government office tasked with maintaining public records and documents, especially records relating to real estate ownership that provide persons other than the owner of a property with real rights over that property.

== Background ==
The offices with similar duties (varying by jurisdiction) include registrar general, register of deeds, registrar of deeds, registrar of titles. The office of such an official may be referred to as the deeds registry or deeds office. In the United States, the recorder of deeds is often an elected county office and is called the county recorder. In some U.S. states, the functions of a recorder of deeds are a responsibility of the county clerk (or the county's clerk of court), and the official may be called a clerk-recorder or recorder-clerk.

The recorder of deeds provides a single location in which records of real property rights are recorded and may be researched by interested parties. The record of deeds often maintains documents regularly recorded by the recorder of deeds, including deeds, mortgages, mechanic's liens, releases and plats, among others. To allow full access to deeds recorded throughout the office history, several indexes may be maintained, which include grantor–grantee indexes, tract indexes, and plat maps. Storage methods to record registry entries include paper, microform, and computer.

The principles of statutory, case, and common law are given effect by the recorder of deeds, insofar as it relates to vested ownership in land and other real rights. Because estate in land can be held in so many complex ways, a single deeds registry provides some clarity, even though it cannot "guarantee" those real property rights.

Title registration provides legal certainty for parties who hold or seek to acquire rights in real property. Reliable evidence of title facilitates investment and transactions involving residential, commercial, industrial, and agricultural property. The accurate and consistent recording of ownership and other interests in land is therefore an important function of the recorder of deeds, helping to provide a clear and accessible record of property rights.

Each document recorded against title to real estate can be examined and the portion of the bundle of rights that it includes can be determined. These records can assist interested parties in researching the history of land and the chain of title for any property and purpose.

== Philippines: Registry of Deeds ==
The Registry of Deeds exists in almost all cities and municipalities in the Philippines and it has a primary duty of registering and keeping all documents pertaining to transfer of real property and issuance of certificates of land title, whether original, transfer or condominium as well as chattel mortgage papers. The said agency is under the supervision of the Land Registration Authority, Department of Justice.

== South Africa: Deeds Registry ==
The South African system of deeds registry is unique in that it is associated with tenure security. When conveyancers transfer title, they are expected to follow rigid procedures which involve ensuring the title and the property comply with all the relevant legislation and regulations, leading to a high degree of certainty and accuracy. Recent concerns about the standard of legal education in South Africa, however, has raised concerns about whether this is still the case. The South African Registrar of Deeds is responsible for the national system of deeds offices which, through a juristic foundation and long-standing practices and procedures, has the effect of “guaranteeing” title.

The Deeds Registries Act and Sectional Titles Act are applied to regulate the deeds registry system, and form the foundation of land registration in South Africa.

== United States: Recorders of Deeds ==
In the U.S., most recorders of deeds are elected officials who serve the area of a county or equivalent jurisdiction.

In some states, the recorder of deeds may also act as a public posting place for documents that are not directly related to estates in land, such as corporate charters, military discharges, Uniform Commercial Code records, applications for marriage licenses, and judgments.

Deeds in a few states of the U.S. are maintained under the Torrens title system or some limited implementation of it. (For example: Minnesota, some property in Massachusetts, Colorado, Hawaii, New York, North Carolina, Ohio, and Washington.)

Other U.S. states maintain their deeds under the common law system of record title. Typically, they are filed in chronological order with a grantor/grantee index.

== Recorders/registers of deeds who became prominent in politics ==
=== District of Columbia ===
- Simon Wolf: Recorder of Deeds for the District of Columbia, 1869–1878
- George A. Sheridan: Recorder of Deeds for the District of Columbia, May 1878 - May 1881
- Frederick Douglass: Recorder of Deeds for the District of Columbia, May 1881 – August 1886
- James Campbell Matthews: Recorder of Deeds for the District of Columbia, August 1886 – March 1887
- James M. Trotter: Recorder of Deeds for the District of Columbia, March 1887 – February 1890
- Blanche Kelso Bruce: Recorder of Deeds for the District of Columbia, February 7, 1890 – May 26, 1894
- C. H. J. Taylor: Recorder of Deeds for the District of Columbia, 1894–1896
- Henry Plummer Cheatham: Recorder of Deeds for the District of Columbia, 1897–1901
- John C. Dancy: Recorder of Deeds for the District of Columbia, 1901–1910
- Henry Lincoln Johnson: Recorder of Deeds for the District of Columbia, 1910 - 1913
- John F. Costello: Recorder of Deeds for the District of Columbia, June 1916 - 1921
- Arthur G. Froe: Recorder of Deeds for the District of Columbia, 1922 - September 1930
- Jefferson S. Coage: Recorder of Deeds for the District of Columbia, October 1930 - February 1934
- William J. Thompkins: Recorder of Deeds for the District of Columbia, March 1934 – 1944
- Marshall L. Shepard: Recorder of Deeds for the District of Columbia, 1944 – 1951
- Vacant as Senate took no action on President Truman's nomination of Earl Wayne Beck, 1951 - June 1952
- President Truman signs S. 2871 which became Public Law 379, 82d Congress (66 Stat. 129), June 1952. Commissioners of DC to fill the job as a civil service position. Recorder of Deeds for DC must be a DC resident for at least 5 years immediately before their appointment.

=== Elsewhere in the US ===
- Joseph Montgomery: Recorder of Deeds and Register of Wills, Dauphin County, Pennsylvania, 1785–94
- Samuel P. Morrill: Register of Deeds for Franklin County, Maine, 1857–67
- Hugh McLaughlin (politician), Register of Deeds for Kings County, New York, for three consecutive terms from 1861
- Charles E. Townsend: Register of Deeds for Jackson County, Michigan, 1886–97
- William S. Vare: Recorder of Deeds for Philadelphia, Pennsylvania, 1902–12
- Edward Boland: Register of Deeds for Hampden County, Massachusetts, 1941–52
- Carol Moseley Braun: Recorder of Deeds for Cook County, Illinois, 1988–92
- Jesse White: Recorder of Deeds for Cook County, Illinois, 1993–99
- Ryan Costello: Recorder of Deeds for Chester County, Pennsylvania, 2008–11
- Zach Payne: Recorder of Deeds for Clark County, Indiana, 2015–18

=== Spain ===
- Mariano Rajoy: Recorder of Deeds first for Padrón, then for Villafranca del Bierzo, and lately for Santa Pola, Spain; from 1979 until the present

== See also ==
- Cadastre
- Crown lands
- Land registration
- Property law
- Recorder (judge)
- Registry of Deeds (Massachusetts)
- Torrens title
