= New Jersey Fair Foreclosure Act =

New Jersey state law protecting residential mortgage debtors

The Fair Foreclosure Act (FFA), N.J.S.A §§ 2A:50-53 to 2A:50-73, is a state law that protects residential mortgage debtors and establishes a uniform statutory framework under which courts can more clearly identify the rights and remedies of the parties involved in foreclosure proceedings throughout New Jersey. The FFA was approved by the New Jersey State Legislature on September 5, 1995, and signed into law by Governor Christine Todd Whitman on December 6, 1995—nearly two years after the bill was first introduced in the State General Assembly on January 24, 1994. The New Jersey Legislature amended the FFA on September 19, 2017, to require mortgage servicers to consider debtors' good faith short sale offers and respond within 60 days of receiving them (as discussed in Subsection 2A:50-56.2 below).

New Jersey is a judicial foreclosure state, meaning that before a creditor with a lien on residential property may foreclose on that property, they must file suit in the New Jersey Superior Court, Chancery Division—the court of general equity in New Jersey. As a result of this limitation on the means of foreclosure available to creditors, the Garden State has one of the longest foreclosure processes in the United States, averaging nearly three and a half years or 1,262 days between the time a notice of default has been issued to a debtor and the time that the property is sold at auction. It is because of this lengthy foreclosure process and the fact that residential mortgage debtors often lack bargaining power that the New Jersey Legislature has established a broad statutory framework to protect debtors and their property interests.

The FFA protects debtors by providing them with "every opportunity" to pay off their mortgages and prevent their homes from being seized by lenders in foreclosure. The Act provides such opportunities by imposing substantial notice requirements on lenders before they may institute foreclosure proceedings and by providing debtors with the right to cure defaults on their mortgage, thereby stalling the foreclosure process and returning their mortgage loans to performing status. Because the FFA is legislation intended to protect residential mortgage debtors, the Act's provisions only apply to residential foreclosures, not commercial foreclosures. Residential mortgage debtors will always be entitled to the protections of the FFA because § 2A:50-61 of the Act voids any waiver of the debtor's statutory rights prior to a default on their mortgage. A borrower defaults on their mortgage when they fail to make payments as required by the terms of the promissory note they signed concurrently with their mortgage.

Although the New Jersey Legislature's main objective in enacting the FFA was to protect residential mortgage debtors, the Act was also intended to benefit residential mortgage lenders by expediting New Jersey's historically slow judicial foreclosure process. While there is debate as to whether the FFA has actually shortened the judicial foreclosure process in New Jersey, § 2A:50-63 of the Act empowers mortgagors to bypass that process entirely under specific circumstances, such as when the mortgaged property has been abandoned or when the parties have agreed to execute a deed in lieu of foreclosure.

== Key Provisions and Relevant Case Law ==
=== 2A:50-56. Written notice of intent to foreclose; contents. ===
After a debtor fails to make a payment on their mortgage and before a creditor may commence a foreclosure action, the creditor must send the debtor a written notice of intention to foreclose ("NOI") that complies with the formalities set forth in § 2A:50-56(c) of the Fair Foreclosure Act. These formalities include stating the identity of the lender, the obligation or security interest at issue, the right of the debtor to cure the default on that obligation, the sum necessary to cure default, and the debtor's right, if any, to transfer the mortgaged real estate to another person subject to the original security interest (mortgage). In determining how strict a lender must be in their compliance with Section 56(c), the Court in Wright v. Bank of America N.A., recognized that "a lender or its agent must accurately recite in any notice of intention to foreclose those things the FFA specifically requires." Such a strict application of Section 56(c) was demonstrated in U.S. Bank National Association v. Guillaume, wherein the Court held that the creditor had failed to comply with the notice requirements of the FFA when its NOI identified the creditor's loan servicer instead of the name and address of the actual lender. Despite its holding, the Court concluded that the default judgment entered against the debtor by the trial court was not void "by virtue of lender's violation of Fair Foreclosure Act's requirement that a notice of intention to foreclose include the name and address of the actual lender." Although lenders must be in strict compliance with the notice formalities of the Fair Foreclosure Act, it is up to the courts' discretion to balance the equities in the broader context of the entire foreclosure proceeding and provide relief to the parties in accordance therewith.

§ 2A:50-56(a) limits the amount of time between the debtor's receipt of the NOI and the lender's filing of any foreclosure action. Under this section, a residential mortgage lender must give to a residential mortgage debtor a written notice of intention to foreclose at least 30 days, but not more than 180 days, prior to the commencement of any foreclosure action. If more than 180 days have passed since the lender sent the NOI, then they must send a new notice within the same 30 to 180 day time frame. § 2A:50-56(b) further requires that any notice of intention be in writing and sent to the debtor by registered or certified mail, return receipt requested, at the debtor's last known address. If the mortgage is secured by "a residence for which a restriction on affordability was recorded," then an NOI must also be provided to the clerk of the municipality in which the mortgaged property is located. § 2A:50-56(d) provides an exception to the requirement that a lender send a notice of intention to foreclose, which applies when a debtor has "voluntarily surrendered the property which is the subject of the residential mortgage."

=== 2A:50-56.1. Statute of limitations relative to foreclosure proceedings. ===
An action to foreclose a residential mortgage shall not be commenced following the EARLIEST of:

a. "Six years from the date fixed for the making of the last payment or the maturity date set forth in the mortgage or the note, bond, or other obligation secured by the mortgage…except that if the date fixed for the making of the last payment or the maturity date has been extended by a written instrument, the action to foreclose shall not be commenced after six years from the extended date under the terms of the written instrument;"
b. "Thirty-six years from the date of recording of the mortgage, or, if the mortgage is not recorded, 36 years from the date of execution, so long as the mortgage itself does not provide for a period of repayment in excess of 30 years;" or
c. "Six years from the date on which the debtor defaulted, which default has not been cured…except that if the date to perform any of the obligations or covenants has been extended by a written instrument or payment on account has been made, the action to foreclose shall not be commenced after six years from the date on which the default or payment on account thereof occurred under the terms of the written instrument."

=== 2A:50-56.2. Response by servicer to good faith offer of short sale. ===
The FFA requires mortgage servicers to respond to good-faith short sale offers from a seller, seller's agent, or other authorized third party within 60 days of the date of the offer. A short sale occurs when "the lender or servicer agrees to release the lien that is secured by a residential mortgage on real property upon receipt of a lesser amount than is owed on the mortgage." In their response to a short sale offer from the debtor, the lender or servicer must approve, deny, or request more information from the party making the offer. A lender or servicer's failure to respond within 60 days results in the buyer being refunded any deposit made in connection with the purchase of the property.

=== 2A:50-56.3. Reinstatement of action to foreclose a residential mortgage; conditions; fee. ===
"If a plaintiff's action to foreclose a residential mortgage has been dismissed without prejudice pursuant to R.4:64-8 of the Rules Governing the Courts of New Jersey of the State of New Jersey, reinstatement of the plaintiff's action may be permitted only on motion for good cause shown. Reinstatements shall be limited to three for any action, except that a reinstatement which is granted following a dismissal without prejudice that resulted from the plaintiff's compliance with federal law or regulation shall not count toward the limit established by this subsection."

=== 2A:50-57. Right to cure default; procedure. ===
§ 2A:50-57(a) provides that residential mortgage debtors shall have the right at any time, until entry of final judgment in a foreclosure proceeding, "to cure the default, de-accelerate and reinstate the residential mortgage." When a debtor cures a default on their mortgage, they are reinstated to the same position as they were in before the default occurred, any acceleration on their obligation under the mortgage is nullified, and if the default occurred prior to the filing of a foreclosure action, the lender is prohibited from instituting such an action. To cure a default on their mortgage, a debtor must pay all sums that would have been due in the absence of default at the time of payment or tender, perform any other obligation which the debtor "would have been bound to perform in the absence of the default," pay court costs and attorney's fees, and pay all contractual late charges associated with the note or security agreement.

One protection provided to debtors in § 2A:50-57 is that a debtor cannot be required to pay any additional fees to exercise their right to cure default. The Court in Luciani v. Hill Wallack upheld this statutory protection when it determined that it would be inequitable to require a debtor to pay attorney's fees that were six times higher than the reasonable value of time expended by the mortgagee's attorney. The Court reasoned that such a charge would be in violation of the FFA's prohibition against lenders charging a "penalty" as a condition to cure default, especially because a homeowner seeking to cure default and avoid foreclosure has little to no bargaining strength. Despite the FFA's bar on additional fees, in Skypala v. Mortgage Electronic Registration Systems, Inc., the Court held that the debtors did not have a claim against the lender for allegedly incorrect calculations of recording fees, sheriff's fees, and interest fees in a draft payoff statement because the lender never invited the debtor's reliance on its calculations and had no reason to believe the debtor would do so. Even if the lender had invited the debtor's reliance on its calculations, it is still unlikely that the debtor would have a valid claim because courts have determined that there exists no private right of action for a lender's violations of the FFA.

=== 2A:50-61. Waiver of debtor's rights void; exception. ===
§ 2A:50-61 of the FFA states that "waivers by the debtor of rights provided pursuant to this act are against public policy, unlawful, and void, unless given after default pursuant to a workout agreement in a separate written document signed by the debtor." In Smith v. Shattls, the plaintiffs conveyed property to the defendant subject to an existing mortgage, leased the property from the defendant, and executed a general release of their rights in the leased property. The trial court subsequently declared the plaintiffs to be the true owners of the property and held that the conveyance and lease of the property constituted an equitable mortgage held by the defendant. In its review of the determinations made by the trial court, the Appellate Court expressed the principle that "a mortgagor may not deprive himself of a right to redeem even by an express agreement for that purpose if such agreement is a part of, or made contemporaneously with, the conveyance." In light of this principle, the Court held that the plaintiffs had executed a valid release of their equity of redemption in the property, reasoning that the general release was executed as an entirely separate transaction from the original mortgage for which the plaintiffs had had long been in default.

Courts have made clear that § 2A:50-61 applies to both express and implied waivers of the debtors statutory rights. This was demonstrated in Wells Fargo Bank, N.A. v. Herzinger, wherein the Court dismissed the plaintiff's foreclosure complaint, holding that the plaintiff failed to serve an NOI upon the defendant by means of certified or registered mail with return receipt requested as explicitly required by the FFA. The Court reasoned that the debtors had not impliedly waived the procedural protections of the FFA simply because they failed to re-assert their claim that the defendant violated the FFA in their motion to dismiss after stating it as an affirmative defense in their earlier pleadings.

=== 2A:50-62. Inapplicability to foreclosures of non-residential mortgages. ===
§ 2A:50-62 of the FFA states that "the provisions of sections 1 through 9 of this act shall not apply to the foreclosure of a non-residential mortgage nor to collection of the obligation by means other than enforcing the lender's lien on the residential property. A lender shall not be required to foreclose a residential mortgage and a non-residential mortgage securing the same obligation in the same proceeding."

=== 2A:50-63. Optional foreclosure procedure. ===
Under § 2A:50-63 of the FFA, residential mortgage creditors are permitted to enforce their liens through an optional foreclosure procedure wherein the creditor may recover the mortgaged property without initiating a judicial foreclosure process as is typically required in New Jersey. A creditor may only pursue this optional foreclosure procedure when: (1) the debtor has abandoned the mortgaged property; (2) the debtor has voluntarily surrendered the mortgaged property by executing a deed in lieu of foreclosure in favor of the lender; or (3) there is no equity in the mortgaged property. In Atlantic Palace Development LLC v. Robledo, the creditor applied for judgment of foreclosure on the debtor's timeshare interest in an Atlantic City condominium, reasoning that the debtor had defaulted on their obligations under the note and abandoned their interest in the timeshare by leaving the condominium "vacant, unoccupied, and unused." The Court began its analysis by establishing that the FFA's optional foreclosure procedure generally applies to timeshares encumbered by a residential mortgage and there is no requirement for an original mortgage instrument to expressly allow for the optional foreclosure procedure to be used. Applying these principles to the facts before it, the Court held that the creditor was entitled to a judgment of foreclosure under the optional foreclosure procedure because the mortgage on the subject timeshare was a residential mortgage and the creditor had satisfied both the procedural and the substantive requirements of the FFA. Finally, the Court emphasized that although the procedure established by § 2A:50-63 is "optional," the use of such procedure must ultimately be acceptable to both parties because the creditor must elect to utilize the procedure and the debtor retains the right to insist that the court enter a judgment requiring a sale.
