= Deeds registration =

Government-run land management system

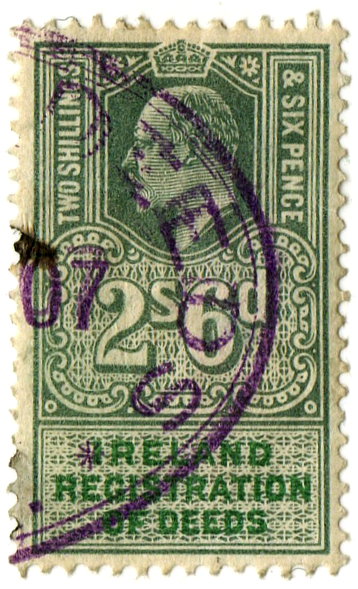
Irish Registration of Deeds revenue stamp of 1902

Deeds registration is a land management system whereby all important instruments which relate to the common law title to parcels of land are registered on a government-maintained register, to facilitate the transfer of title. The system had been used in some common law jurisdictions and continues to be used in some jurisdictions, including most of the United States.

It is being replaced by Torrens systems in many jurisdictions. Australia, Ireland as well as most Canadian provinces have converted from deeds registries to Torrens titles. Some Canadian provinces have never operated a deeds registry and have always used Torrens titles. Other Canadian provinces which have converted from a deeds registry to Torrens titles have operated both systems in conjunction until the Torrens system gradually superseded the deeds registry system, as was the case in Nova Scotia and New Brunswick during the 2000s. In the Canadian province of Ontario, electronic registration led to Ontario's version of Torrens title covering almost all land, but the past deeds registration still governs some issues. Hong Kong and the Canadian provinces of Quebec, Newfoundland and Labrador and Prince Edward Island are the only provinces left which still operate a deeds registration system.

In contrast to the Torrens system in which basically the one who registered in a land registry as owner of a piece or parcel of land has an indefeasible title of the land, deeds registration system is merely a registration of all important instruments related to that land. In order to establish one's title to the land, a person (or usually their purchaser's attorney) will ascertain, for example:

- all the title documents have been properly executed,
- "a chain of title" is established, i.e. the proper ownerships from the granting of the land from the government to the current owner,
- there are no encumbrances on the land that probably will harm the title of the land.

== Duty to give and show good title ==
Since, in contrast to the Torrens system, the registry is merely a record of all instruments related to the land, the "owner" as shown on the land registry record (or common known as "land search record" in Hong Kong) does not necessarily mean that he has a "good title", which means a title that is not defeasible or potentially defeasible.

In a sale and purchase of land, a vendor is required to show a "good title" to the purchaser. Since the land search record is not conclusive, it leads to problems when a vendor has to prove his title, in particular when the land is old or involves multiple encumbrances. This may lead to litigation if the parties cannot agree on whether a good title is shown.

== Relief from harsh system ==
In Hong Kong, the vendor is generally only required to prove his title up to 15 years prior to the date of the sale and purchase. Further, various legislative measures relieve the vendor's duty. For example, the vendor can rely on assumption that a recital of an instrument referring to matters prior to 15-year-old is true.

In Ireland a vendor has to produce "a good root of title" (usually a conveyance for value but some other instruments qualifies). A purchaser cannot insist that the root of title to be more than 40 years old; the practice being only to insist on a minimal 20-year period. There is a presumption that the recitals in a conveyance for valuable consideration are true if that conveyance is at least 20 years old.

== Changing to title registration ==
Many jurisdictions have switched or are switching from a deeds registration system to a system of title registration. For example, Hong Kong, one of the last common law jurisdictions to maintain a deed registration system, passed the Land Titles Ordinance in 2004, which will see Hong Kong shift to the Torrens system. The law will be gradually implemented over a period of twelve years. However, there is no timetable for the commencement of the Ordinance as at 2016.

== See also ==
- Land registration
- Recording (real estate)
- Recorder of deeds
