= Grantor–grantee index =

A grantor–grantee index is a general term for two lists of real property transfers maintained in alphabetical order of the last name of the parties transferring the property. One list is the grantor index, an alphabetic list of sellers (grantors). The other list is the grantee index, an alphabetic list of purchasers (grantees).

In a typical county in the United States, the index is kept by an official known as the County Recorder (or the Recorder of Deeds). Transfers are not necessarily listed in strict alphabetical order, but are often placed chronologically in a letter index corresponding to the first letter of the party's last name. In the grantor index, the alphabetic order of entries is by the grantors' last names. In each entry, the name of the grantee (purchaser) is then given, along with the location of the affected parcel and the volume and page number where the full text of the deed or other recorded instrument describing the transfer may be found. In the grantee index, the order of entries is by the grantees' last names, and each entry provides the same identifying information for the recorded instrument.

Historically, the full-text records were kept in large bound volumes, and each volume held indexed entries for a single year, group of years, or partial year. More recently, in many United States offices, the records have been stored on microform or on computer.

== See also ==
- Tract index
- Recording (real estate)
- Grant (law)
