= Nemo dat quod non habet =

Legal principle

Rules regarding resale of stolen or embezzled goods to a good-faith third party by country

Nemo dat quod non habet, literally meaning "no one [can] give what they do not have", is a legal rule in common law, sometimes called the nemo dat rule, that states that the purchase of a possession from someone who has no ownership right to it also denies the purchaser any ownership title. It is equivalent to the civil (continental) Nemo plus iuris ad alium transferre potest quam ipse habet rule, which means "one cannot transfer to another more rights than they have". The rule usually stays valid even if the purchaser does not know that the seller has no right to claim ownership of the object of the transaction (a bona fide purchaser); however, in many cases, more than one innocent party is involved, making judgment difficult for courts and leading to numerous exceptions to the general rule that aim to give a degree of protection to bona fide purchasers without undermining the protection of the original owners.

== United States ==
In American law, a bona fide purchaser who unknowingly purchases and subsequently sells stolen goods will, at common law, be held liable in trover for the full market value of those goods as of the date of conversion. Since the true owner retains legal title, the seller is liable even in a chain of successive bona fide purchasers (i.e., the true owner can successfully sue the fifth bona fide purchaser in trover). However, the problem of successive bona fide purchasers can be remedied: If the jurisdiction recognises an implied warranty that the seller has title to the property (such as under Article 2 of the Uniform Commercial Code (UCC)), then the bona fide purchaser can sue the seller for breach of that implied warranty. Courts of equity traditionally also recognise various other exceptions, likely giving rise to the idea embodied in the modern UCC.

This rule is exemplified in circumstances like the Holocaust reconciliation movement, where property, such as works of art, stolen or confiscated by the Nazis was returned to the families of the original owners. Anyone who purchased the art or thought they had ownership was denied any rights over the litigious property due to the nemo dat rule.

As mentioned earlier, the nemo dat rule has numerous exceptions. Legal tender, for example, does not adhere to the rule in certain circumstances. For example, if a rogue buys goods from a bona fide merchant, then that merchant will not have to return the bills to the true owner because holding the rule to be otherwise would disrupt the economy and prevent the free flow of goods. The same may be true of other "negotiable" instruments like cheques. If Alice, a thief, steals a cheque from Bob and sells it to innocent Charlie, then Charlie is entitled to deal with the cheque, and Bob cannot claim it back from Charlie (though the name appearing on the cheque may affect the validity of such a transfer).

Another matter is the transfer of other legal rights normally granted by ownership. In 2011, a US District judge ruled that a woman who had purchased a stolen laptop could sue a device tracking company for invasion of privacy stemming from recording software installed on the laptop to facilitate its recovery after being stolen. This ruling demonstrated that bona fide purchasers are entitled to some rights by virtue of possession alone, or that nemo dat is partially superseded by the bona fide purchaser's right to privacy.

=== Recording statutes ===
When dealing with real property, most American jurisdictions have codified recording statutes that will enable subsequent purchasers to divest title from the party with common law title if they qualify for protection under the recording statute. Three varieties of recording statutes exist: 1) race statutes, 2) notice statutes, and 3) race-notice statutes.

A race statute will divest common law title from a person with superior title if the subsequent purchaser recorded their deed prior to the person with superior title. A notice statute will divest common law title from a person with superior title if the subsequent purchaser had no notice (either actual or constructive – otherwise known as bona fide) of the true owner's title. A race-notice statute requires a subsequent purchaser to be bona fide and record first.

== English law ==
The original owner can obtain protection against the former owner through the doctrine of estoppel (see also, s 21(1) of the Sale of Goods Act 1979 "unless the owner of the goods is by his conduct precluded from denying the seller's authority to sell"). Methods of the estoppel can be by words, by conduct, or by negligence.

Estoppel by words, or representation by the original owner through words that he is the true owner or has the owner's authority to sell:

- Henderson & Co v Williams [1895] 1 QB 521
- Shaw v Commissioner of Metropolitan Police [1987] 1 WLR 1332, following Henderson

Estoppel by conduct:

- Farquharson Bros v C King & Co Ltd [1902] AC 325
- Mercantile Bank of India Ltd v Central Bank of India [1938] AC 287, upholding Farquharson
- Central Newbury Car Auctions Ltd v Unity Finance Ltd [1957] 1 QB 371

Mistake about identity:

- Shogun Finance Ltd v Hudson [2003] UKHL 62

=== Exceptions ===
==== Sales in open markets ====
In the eighteenth century at the time of William Blackstone, sales in an open market were an exception to the nemo dat principle in English law.

However, after the growth in the UK of car boot sales led to opportunities for rogues to "fence" stolen property, the Sale of Goods (Amendment) Act 1994 abolished the "market overt" exception to the nemo dat rule in 1995.

== Scots law ==
As in the United States, banknotes in Scotland are an exception to the rule. This issue arose in the 1749 case of Crawfurd v The Royal Bank, where title to a banknote issued by the Bank of Scotland that had gone missing in the post and found in the possession of the Royal Bank of Scotland was disputed.

== See also ==
- Corpus Juris Civilis
- English property law
