= European Land Registry Association =

International non-profit association

The European Land Registry Association (ELRA) is an international non-profit association whose mission and primary purpose is “the development and understanding of the role of land registration in real property and capital markets”. ELRA was born on 2004 to defend the interest of land registries in the European Union. Initially it started off with 12 members and it now has 30 organizations representing the land registries of 22 Member States.

== ELRA Board of Director ==
ELRA's internal organisation includes the following organs:

- General Assembly
- President
- Secretary General
- Treasurer

== Projects ==
=== IMOLA ===
The project aims to produce a model for standardised land registry output, connected to explanatory material in different languages, and to provide training to improve understanding of the different legal systems involved. The European Land Registry Association (ELRA) will work closely with other associations and networks working in this area. It will use the resources of ELRA's European Land Registry Network (ELRN) and build on the experience gained from EULIS’s Project LINE (a project which aims to facilitate compliance with the requirements of the e-Justice programme in the area of land registration).
The objective is to increase the accessibility and transparency of land registry information and to facilitate the registration of cross-border documents. Varied legislation and practices of Land Registries hamper the exchange of information between them and the registration of cross border documents. Any standard model has to take into account fundamental differences in national organisation. However, common points offer the possibility of defining a structure of key information shared by the majority of Land Registry systems.
