= Seal (contract law) =

Legal effect of impressing a symbol

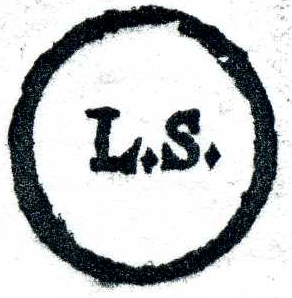
German "L.S." mark from 1687, for locus sigilli

In the law, a seal affixed to a contract or other legal instrument has had special legal significance at various times in the jurisdictions that recognise it. In the courts of common law jurisdictions, a contract which was sealed ("made under seal") was treated differently from other written contracts (which were "made under hand"), although this practice gradually fell out of favour in most of these jurisdictions in the 19th and early 20th century. The legal term seal arises from the wax seal used throughout history for authentication (among other purposes).

Originally, only a wax seal was accepted as a seal by the courts, but by the 19th century many jurisdictions had relaxed the definition to include an impression in the paper on which the instrument was printed, an embossed paper wafer affixed to an instrument, a scroll made with a pen, or the printed words "Seal" or "L.S." (standing for the Latin term locus sigilli meaning "place of the seal").

Notwithstanding their reduced significance, seals are still used on contracts, usually in the impression on paper form.

== Legal significance in contract law ==
Until modern statutory reforms in contract law, a seal was widely recognised by courts in common law jurisdictions as removing the need for consideration (value) in a contract. This reflects classical contract theory, in which consideration was viewed as a formal aspect of a contract, so that a seal could be considered an alternative form. A seal was not per se a type of consideration, but rather raised a presumption of consideration (courts have varied in their opinions of whether this presumption was rebuttable). See, e.g., Marine Contractors Co. Inc. v. Hurley, 365 Mass. 280, 285-86 (1974).

The rationale for this special treatment of sealed contracts can be understood in terms of the legal formalities that are associated with sealing a document with a wax seal. Firstly, the following of the legal formality of affixing a seal to a document was evidence of the existence of a contract. Secondly, the need to use a seal – widely known to have legal significance – served to impress upon the parties the significance of the agreement being made. This element of deliberation is important in the context of many legal theories for why donative promises are not generally enforceable in the same way as contracts: there is a concern that donative promises are sometimes made under pressure (for example, from family members) without adequate deliberation, which explains why a requirement for the legal formality of the seal might substitute for consideration to give enforceability to donative promises. Thirdly, the following of the legal formalities through the use of a seal demonstrated beyond doubt that a legal transaction was intended by the parties.

In addition to these three abstract reasons, there may also have been a more practical reason, namely that the object used to imprint the wax, usually an engraved signet ring, identified its owner, thereby providing evidence that the owner of the seal was party to the contract.

Besides substituting for consideration, other consequences of the seal that, at least historically, have held include:

- even payment did not discharge a sealed contract, if the instrument itself was not physically destroyed.
- fraud was not permitted as a defence to a sealed contract
- subsequent modifications to a sealed contract were not binding except where the modifications were also under seal.
- a principal not designated as such in the contract (undisclosed principal) could not be connected to the contract if it was sealed.
- an instrument under seal may also enjoy a longer statute of limitations within which it may be enforced.

== Position in different jurisdictions ==
=== England and Wales ===
In England and Wales, the common law courts originally recognised only wax seals, but this requirement was gradually relaxed. By the 20th century a small circle of red adhesive paper affixed to the document in question was sufficient when an individual had to use a seal (most commonly on a contract for the sale of land), although the courts also held that a circle containing the letters "L.S." was adequate.

The common law rule which required that a deed made by a private individual had to be sealed to be validly executed was finally abolished in 1989 by the Law of Property (Miscellaneous Provisions) Act 1989. The Act implemented recommendations made by the Law Commission of England and Wales in their 1987 report Deeds and Escrows and replaced seals with the requirements that the document had to explicitly state that it was being executed as a deed, and had to be witnessed.

With regard to companies and other corporate bodies, the common law originally required that all contracts made by such a body had to be made under seal, whether they were deeds or not. This rule was gradually eroded away, for example being abolished in respect of companies by the Companies Acts in the first half of the twentieth century, but until 1960 remained in force for other corporations. It was abolished by the Corporate Bodies' Contracts Act 1960. Normal contracts (i.e. not deeds) can now be made by a corporation in the same way as they can be made by an individual.

The Companies Act 1989 removed the requirement for a company to have a common seal at all, and made provision for those documents which had previously needed to be executed under seal, such as deeds, to instead be executed by officers of the company. However companies can still have and continue to use seals to execute deeds if they wish, in which case the seal has to be engraved (i.e., a seal which leaves an impression on the page, not printed or a wafer facsimile) and to bear the name of the company.

Some other corporations (which are not companies registered under the Companies Acts) are still required to have and use seals. For example, the royal charter incorporating the Royal College of Nursing requires the college to have a common seal, as does that of the BBC.

Also, the changes relating to deeds which were introduced in 1989 do not apply to corporations sole such as government ministers or bishops of the Church of England. Therefore, where a corporation sole has to execute a deed, it continues to have to do so by the use of an official seal.

=== United States ===
In the United States, wax seals were never expressly required. The Restatement of Contracts (Second) notes that

Impressions directly on the paper were recognized early and are still common for notarial and corporate seals, and gummed paper wafers have been widely used. In the absence of statute, decisions have divided on the effectiveness of the written or printed word 'seal', the printed initials 'L.S.' ..., a scrawl made with a pen (often called a 'scroll') and a recital of sealing.

The relaxation of the definition of a seal was generally contemporaneous with reduced distinctions given to sealed contracts. This trend can be seen as a parallel of the courts' modern relaxation of their interpretation of the Statute of Frauds, and reflects the evolution of modern contract theory from classical contract theory. It has been noted that "about two-thirds of the [US] states have now adopted statutory provisions depriving the seal of its binding effect," although several important jurisdictions, such as New Jersey and Wisconsin, have retained the concept.

Schnell v. Nell (1861), which is widely cited as an example of nominal consideration, involved a sealed contract. Although the distinction of seal had already been abolished by Indiana statute, it is likely the parties viewed the seal as making the contract enforceable, much as the nominal consideration of $1 would have under classical contract theory.

== See also ==
- Great Seal
- Lord Privy Seal
- Formalities in English law
