= Crawfurd v The Royal Bank =

Crawfurd v The Royal Bank (1749), also spelled Crawford v The Royal Bank, was a Court of Session case in Scotland which established the "absolute currency of money", i.e. the fungibility of banknotes.

== Background ==
Shortly after its incorporation in 1695, the Bank of Scotland began to issue banknotes. Coins were in short supply in Scotland at that time, with an estimated total value of not more than £1 million in 1707. As a result, paper banknotes soon became the preferred medium of exchange especially for high-value transactions. The Bank operated a fractional reserve, holding five times as many liabilities in the form of banknotes as it held assets in the form of coins by July 1696. Although paper money had firmly established itself in practice by the mid-18th century, its legal status was indeterminate without a body of case law to rely on.

On 30 July 1748, an Edinburgh lawyer named Hew Crawfurd mailed two £20 notes to the merchant William Lang in Glasgow, but the letter was lost. Prior to sending them, Crawfurd had meticulously signed his name on the banknotes and recorded their serial numbers, so he notified the Bank of Scotland and advertised his predicament in several newspapers. One of the notes was never found, but the other note turned up at the Royal Bank of Scotland. Crawfurd requested the Royal Bank to open a multiplepoinding action with respect to the note, but the Bank refused. Thus he brought suit in the Court of Session against the Royal Bank.

Both banks were alarmed by his action, as an adverse finding would subject banknotes to infirmities of title like any other property, which would threaten the idea of paper money as a common circulating currency. Despite their generally poor relations with each other at the time, they agreed to cooperate and jointly defend the case.

== Decision ==
The first point of contention was whether banknotes should be considered tangible chattel property or an intangible right to payment from the Bank of Scotland. What made this point challenging was that as a bearer instrument, a banknote was not only a right to be paid by the Bank, but also a right to the physical piece of paper it was printed on (which determined who had the right to be paid). Ultimately, the case was argued and adjudicated primarily with the assumption that banknotes were tangible property similar to coins.

With that point being accepted, the case shifted to a multiplepoinding of who had the strongest title to the banknote. While there was no direct evidence of theft, the case was argued as if the money had been stolen. Crawfurd's counsel argued that the money should be treated like any stolen property; it was true that stolen coins often could not be reclaimed, but that was due to a lack of proof rather than any particulars of law. In this case, Crawfurd could clearly prove that the money belonged to him, so it should be returned. The Banks' counsel, James Erskine, appealed to the tradition of Roman law, based on how ancient Romans viewed the legal status of money. Because money was fungible and consumable, they argued, a bona fide recipient of money would be the rightful owner even if it were stolen.

In a unanimous decision, the judges decided "that money is not subject to any vitium reale; and that it cannot be vindicated from the bona fide possessor, however clear the proof [of] the theft may be"; thus, "Mr Crawfurd had no claim to the note in question". If banknotes accepted in good faith could be vindicated, then merchants would not be able to accept paper money without detailed evidence of its provenance, thus destroying its usefulness. One of the judges, Lord Elchies, concluded that banking would be destroyed if banknotes could be considered stolen and returned to their original owner; another judge, Lord Kilkerran, posited that a public bank could not even exist under such circumstances.

== Legacy ==
The same principle of bona fide acquisition of currency was established in English law by Miller v Race (1758), though without reference to Crawfurd. Both these cases began to be cited as precedent, though there were minor differences between them; these differences were later removed by statute in 1856. The Bills of Exchange Act 1882 unified the bona fide rule across the United Kingdom.

American courts have developed a similar principle, on the basis of facilitating practical commerce by obviating the need to verify the provenance of money. However, this principle does not apply to cryptocurrency, as seen in the case United States v. 50.44 Bitcoins (2016).
