= Bermondsey Market =

Antiques market in Bermondsey, London

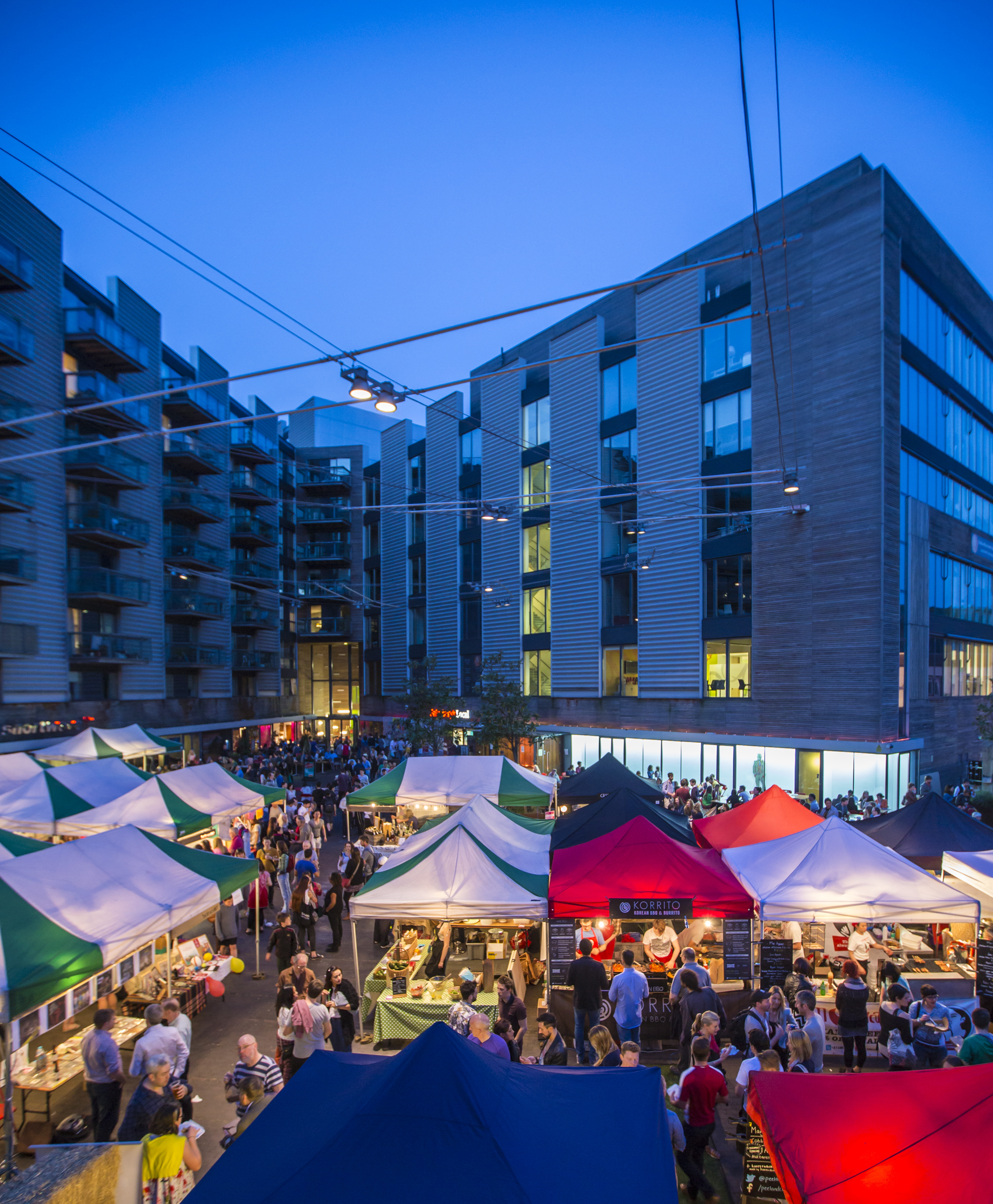
- The market in 2014
- Location: Bermondsey Square; Bermondsey, Southwark, Greater London; 51.4974°N 0.0811°W
- Opening date: 1950
- Management: BAM 2021 Ltd
- Owner: Southwark London Borough Council
- Environment: Outdoor
- Goods sold: Antiques, collectables, vintage, jewellery, silver & gold
- Days normally open: Friday
- Parking: On street
- Interactive map of Bermondsey Market

Bermondsey Market (also known as New Caledonian Market and Bermondsey Square Antiques Market) is an antiques market at Bermondsey Square on Tower Bridge Road in Bermondsey, south London, England. The location was formerly the site of Bermondsey Abbey.

The market still opens every Friday, trading from early morning until 2pm and is the oldest antiques market/event in the UK.

== History ==
The 15th century English Queen Consort of Edward IV, Elizabeth Woodville, lived her last five years in Bermondsey Abbey, dying in 1492.

The Caledonian Market moved to its current location in 1950 after the old Caledonian Market site in Islington was designated for redevelopment in the late 1940s.

=== Marché ouvert ===
The opening hours of the Bermondsey Market from 6am until noon (some sources say 4am until 2pm) reflect the ancient law of market overt, which was abolished in 1995. Under this law, in a number of designated markets, including Bermondsey Market, if an item was sold between sunset and sunrise then its provenance could not be questioned, so stolen goods could be traded and good title would pass to the purchaser. To quote Minister for the Arts Estelle Morris in July 2003 during the Second Reading of the Dealing In Cultural Objects (Offences) Bill:

I did not have information about marché ouvert in the deep recesses of my mind, but experts reliably inform me that it no longer exists. The hon. Member for Uxbridge (Mr. Randall) will be surprised to learn that it has been abolished only recently. It used to exist in designated markets, including Bermondsey. I am sure that the promoter will be interested in telling the hon. Member for Southwark, North and Bermondsey (Simon Hughes) about that. In it, items could be sold before sunrise. Believe it or not, in this land of ours, people could sell stolen—my officials put "dodgy" in brackets, but we do not use that term—objects. I assure hon. Members that it has been abolished. I hope that that deals with the fears of the hon. Member for Uxbridge.

In 2007 redevelopment of the site to build a hotel, apartments and offices started. Whilst the antique market continued, due to space availability, it was greatly reduced to a few dozen stallholders, a far cry from the normal 200+! Sadly, many regulars, needing a regular and reliable income relocated to other markets and fairs. For the next 10-12 years, some stallholders returned and 80+ stall days were not uncommon.

=== COVID & Building Works ===
Early 2020 brought us Covid-19 and, following many months of lockdown and the market closure, a new, dedicated business, BAM 2021 Ltd, was created to take over the management and development of the market from Southwark Council.

The average age of antique & collectors stall holders is generally quite high and Bermondsey was probably well above that average. In some cases, the market has seen three generations of families tending their pitches. During COVID, some regulars took it as a sign that retirement was a good idea and, sadly several were lost for medical reasons.

In April 2021, the market reopened, welcoming back 50+ stallholders, however, the joy was short lived, as building works to replace the surrounding buildings exterior cladding started. For over a year, this reduced the available market space to circa 20 outdoor stalls.

Today, the market regularly attracts 30+ stall holders and with plans to give the market fixtures and fittings a well needed upgrade, 2025 brings the markets 75th anniversary, which will be celebrated for many months across the year.
