= Formalities in English law =

Formalities in English law are required in some kinds of transaction by English contract law and trusts law. In a limited number of cases, agreements and trusts will be unenforceable unless they meet a certain form prescribed by statute. The main kinds of formality that a statute can require are to put the transaction in writing, to make a deed, or to register it at a government registrar (such as HM Land Registry or Companies House).

While contracts and trusts can be generally created without formality, some transactions are thought to require form either because it makes a person think carefully before they bind themselves to an agreement, or merely that it serves as clear evidence of the transaction.

== History ==
The history of requirements of formality in English law generally shows a gradual shift towards fewer and fewer instances of transaction needing form, as technology and recording of agreements has become more advanced. Originally a contract which was sealed ("made under seal", using a wax seal) was treated differently from other written contracts (which were "made under hand"). It was predominantly a mark of authentication. A document that was "signed, sealed and delivered" was taken as secure. Originally, only a wax seal was accepted as a seal by the courts, but by the 19th century many jurisdictions had relaxed the definition to include an impression in the paper on which the instrument was printed, an embossed paper wafer affixed to an instrument, a scroll made with a pen, or the printed words "Seal" or "L.S." (standing for the Latin term locus sigilli meaning "place of the seal"). If a seal was in place, common law courts regarded it as removing the need for consideration to support the contract. It raised, at least, a rebuttable presumption of consideration.

By the 20th century a small circle of red adhesive paper affixed to the document in question was sufficient when an individual had to use a seal. This process was described in a report of the Law Commission, Transfer of Land: Formalities for Deeds and Escrows as "a meaningless exercise". This was most common on a contract for the sale of land, although the courts also held that a circle containing the letters "L.S." was adequate.

The common law rule which required that a deed made by a private individual had to be sealed to be validly executed was finally abolished in 1989 by the Law of Property (Miscellaneous Provisions) Act 1989. The Act implemented recommendations made by the Law Commission of England and Wales in their 1987 report Deeds and Escrows and replaced seals with the requirements that the document had to explicitly state that it was being executed as a deed, and had to be witnessed.

== Contracts ==
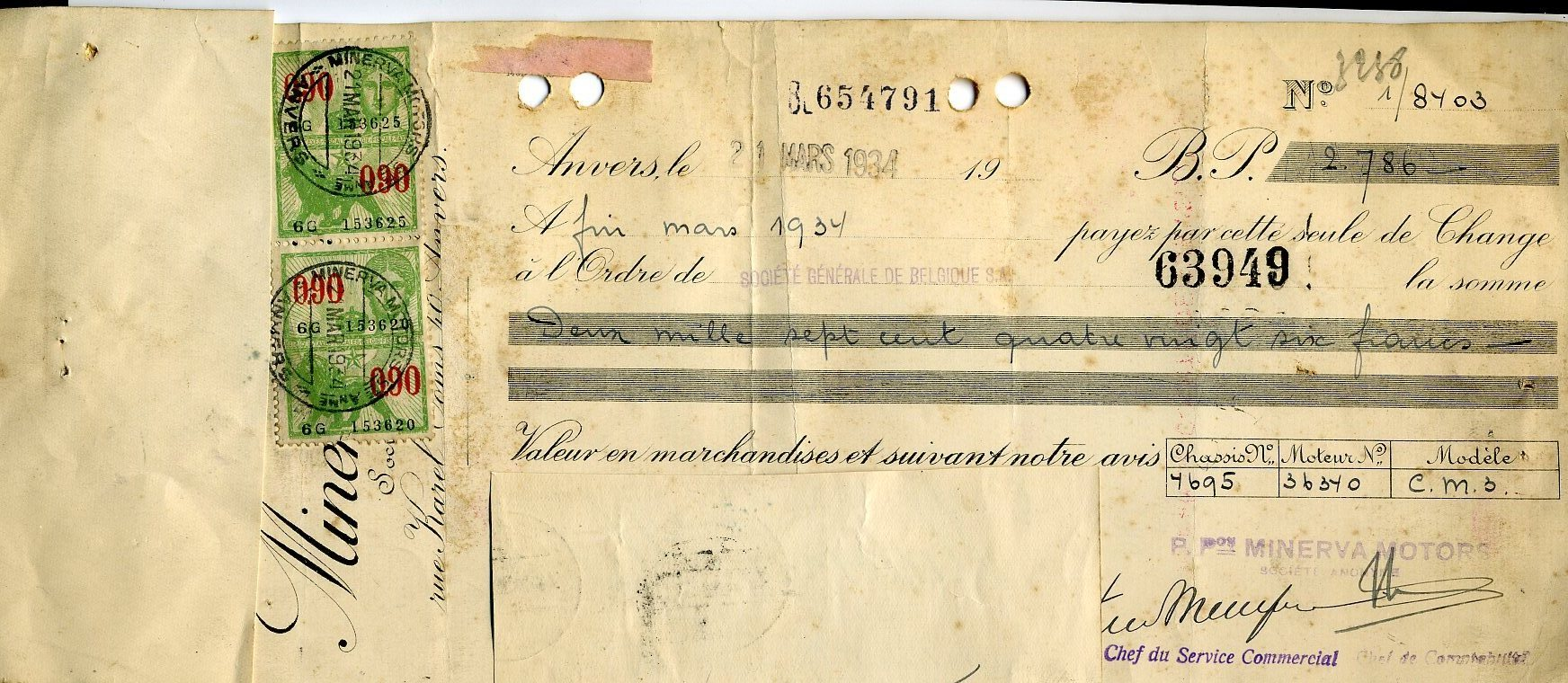
A bill of exchange, for instance a cheque, is a written order by one person to another (typically a bank) to pay a sum of money to a third person.

Under contract law, formality is typically required for large engagements. This includes the sale of land, a lease of property over three years, a consumer credit agreement, and a bill of exchange. A contract for guarantee must also, at some stage, be evidenced in writing. English contract law takes the approach that a gratuitous promise is not legally binding. While a gift that is delivered will transfer property irrevocably, and while someone may always bind themselves to a promise without anything in return to deliver a thing in future if they sign a deed that is witnessed, a simple promise to do something in future can be revoked. This is result is reached, with some complexity, through the English doctrine of consideration.

Invitations to tender, especially in the public sector, often engage formal requirements such as completion of specific documents and receipt of the completed tender at a specified location or via a specified form of electronic submission by a formal deadline. Discussion regarding a public body's discretion to accept a tender which did not comply with formalities took place in resolving the lawsuit between J B Leadbitter and Co. Ltd. and Devon County Council in the High Court in 2009. Both parties relied on passages written by Professor Sue Arrowsmith, an expert in the field of public sector procurement, who affirmed that "formalities are imposed for a contracting authority's convenience, so that it can be argued that [they] should be able to waive them", but on the other hand, "waiving formalities or allowing late tenders may result in an advantage for the tenderer concerned that is not available to others". Her conclusion, adopted by the judge in court, recognised that an authority does have general discretion to accept tenders which did not comply with formalities, subject to an obligation to treat all tenderers equally.

A contract of employment requires no form to be effective, however an employee has a right under the Employment Rights Act 1996 section 1 to receive written particulars stating the contract from the employer. This may not in fact be the contract, which a court can construe from all the circumstances, but will be strong evidence of it.

== Trusts ==
Trusts can generally be made without formality, however three main, large and practically relevant exceptions exist. First, a trust of land requires a signature on a written document evidencing a declaration, under the Law of Property Act 1925 section 53(1)(b). This means, someone can first declare a trust of land without any writing or signature, so long as in the case of a dispute the declaration is evidenced in writing. Second, any "disposition" of an existing equitable interests also requires a signature under section 53(1)(c). Such a declaration actually requires form at the time. Third, under the Wills Act 1837 section 9 requires that the testator signs a written document and this is witnessed by two people.

== Land ==
A register operated for the county of Middlesex (excluding the City of London) since 1709. but the first national system of land registration was first attempted in England and Wales under the Land Registration Act 1862. This voluntary national system proved ineffective and, following further attempts in 1875 and 1897, the present system was brought into force by the Land Registration Act 1925. It is operated by the HM Land Registry. Over time various areas of the country were designated areas of compulsory registration by order so in different parts of the country compulsory registration has been around longer than in others. The last order was made in 1990, so now virtually all transactions in land result in compulsory registration. One difference is land changing ownership after death, where land is gifted rather than sold; these became compulsorily registrable only in April 1998. Similarly it became compulsory to register land when a mortgage is created on it in 1998.

The Land Registration Act 2002 leaves the 1925 system substantially in place but enables the future compulsory introduction of electronic conveyancing using electronic signatures to transfer and register property. The Land Registry is connected to the European Land Information Service EULIS. Details of registrations are available to any person upon payment of the prescribed fees. Precautionary measures have been introduced in recent years to verify the identity of persons attempting to change records of title. No details will be on record for any land which has not had a relevant transaction recorded as will often occur if, for example, ownership was last transferred before the introduction of compulsory registration in a particular area.

Land registration commenced in Scotland with the creation of the Register of Sasines by the Registration Act 1617. The Land Registration (Scotland) Act 1979 introduced a new system which now records all changes of ownership of land and creation of new titles. The Registers of Scotland agency is responsible for maintaining both the Register of Sasines and the new register. Land registration in Northern Ireland is operated by Land and Property Services, an executive agency within the Department of Finance and Personnel for Northern Ireland. Prior to 1 Apr 2007 it was dealt with by the Land Registers Northern Ireland government agency.

== Companies ==
With regard to companies and other corporate bodies, the common law originally required that all contracts made by such a body had to be made under seal, whether they were deeds or not. This rule was gradually eroded away, for example being abolished in respect of companies by the Companies Acts in the first half of the twentieth century. For companies registered under the Companies Acts the relevant provision is now section 43 of the Companies Act 2006. But until 1960 this remained in force for other corporations. It was abolished by the Corporate Bodies' Contracts Act 1960. Normal contracts (i.e. not deeds) can now be made by a corporation in the same way as they can be made by an individual. The Companies Act 1989 removed the requirement for a company to have a common seal at all, and made provision for those documents which had previously needed to be executed under seal, such as deeds, to instead be executed by officers of the company. However companies can still have and continue to use seals to execute deeds if they wish, in which case the seal has to be engraved (i.e., a seal which leaves an impression on the page, not printed or a wafer facsimile) and to bear the name of the company.

Some other corporations (which are not companies registered under the Companies Acts) are still required to have and use seals. For example, the royal charter incorporating the Royal College of Nursing requires the college to have a common seal, as does that of the BBC. Also, the changes relating to deeds which were introduced in 1989 do not apply to corporations sole such as Government Ministers or bishops of the Church of England. Therefore, where a corporation sole has to execute a deed, it continues to have to do so by the use of an official seal.

== See also ==
- Seal
