= Market overt =

Rules regarding resale of stolen or embezzled goods to a good-faith third part by country

Market overt or marché ouvert (Law French for "open market") is an English legal concept originating in medieval times governing subsequent ownership of stolen goods. The rule was abolished in England and Wales in 1994 by the Sale of Goods (Amendment) Act 1994 (c. 32) but it is still good law in some common law jurisdictions, such as Hong Kong and British Columbia.

In general, the sale of stolen goods does not convey effective title (see Nemo dat quod non habet). However, under marché ouvert, if goods were openly sold in designated markets between sunrise and sunset, provenance could not be questioned, and effective title of ownership was obtained. The concept originated centuries ago when people did not travel much; if the victim of a theft did not bother to look in his local market on market day—the only place where the goods were likely to be—he was not being suitably diligent.

The rule notably applied to Bermondsey Market, which still trades from dawn until mid-afternoon.

== England and Wales ==
=== Application ===
The following conditions were required for the market overt rule to apply:

1. The market had to be open, public and legally constituted, meaning it was established either:
  1. Before time immemorial, defined by the Statute of Westminster 1275 (3 Edw. 1) as 3 September 1189; or
  2. By charter or statute
2. The goods were sold on open display
3. The goods were of a kind which was vendible in the market or fair, and which the seller was offering there ostensibly
4. The sale took place according to the usage of the market
5. The sale of goods took place after dawn and before sunset, and not behind a curtain

A crown prerogative existed, exempting the sovereign from the rule. The rule did not exist in Wales, Scotland, Northern Ireland or Ireland.

=== Codification ===
During the reign of Elizabeth I, the Sale of Horses Act 1588 (31 Eliz. 1. c. 12) exempted the sale of horses from the rule.

The common law on sale of goods, including the market overt rule, was codified by in legislation by section 22 of the Sale of Goods Act 1893 (56 & 57 Vict. c. 71), restated by section 22 of the Sale of Goods Act 1979.

Section 22(1) of the 1979 act stated:

"Where goods are sold in market overt, according to the, usages of the market, the buyer acquires a good title to the goods, provided he buys them in good faith"

=== Abolition in England and Wales ===
Sale of Goods (Amendment) Act 1994 (Note: Section 3(1).)
- Act of Parliament
- Parliament of the United Kingdom
- Long title: An Act to abolish the rule of law relating to the sale of goods in market overt.
- Citation: 1994 c. 32
- Territorial extent: England and Wales; Scotland; Northern Ireland (sections 1 and 3); (Note: Section 3(4).)

Dates
- Royal assent: 3 November 1994
- Commencement: 3 January 1995 (Note: Section 3(3).)
Other legislation
Amends	Laws in Wales Act 1542; Sea Fisheries (Shellfish) Act 1967; Sale of Goods Act 1979

Status: Current legislation

Text of statute as originally enacted

Text of the Sale of Goods (Amendment) Act 1994 as in force today (including any amendments) within the United Kingdom, from legislation.gov.uk.

The Sale of Goods (Amendment) Act 1994 (c. 32) is an act of Parliament of the United Kingdom whose sole purpose was to abolish market overt and its equivalent in Wales, came into force in January 1995, repealing section 22(1) of the Sale of Goods Act 1979 and section 47 of the Laws in Wales Act 1542 (34 & 35 Hen. 8. c. 26).

One designated market was Bermondsey Market, in South London. In the early 1990s, several portraits by well-known 18th-century portrait painters that had been stolen from Lincoln's Inn each sold for less than £100 from an outside stall. Since they had been sold in "market overt", the purchaser could keep them. Estelle Morris, Minister for the Arts stated during the second reading of the Dealing in Cultural Objects (Offences) Bill in July 2003:

I did not have information about marché ouvert in the deep recesses of my mind, but experts reliably inform me that it no longer exists. The hon. Member for Uxbridge (Mr. Randall) will be surprised to learn that it has been abolished only recently. It used to exist in designated markets, including Bermondsey. I am sure that the promoter will be interested in telling the hon. Member for Southwark, North and Bermondsey (Simon Hughes) about that. In it, items could be sold before sunrise [sic]. Believe it or not, in this land of ours, people could sell stolen—my officials put "dodgy" in brackets, but we do not use that term—objects. I assure hon. Members that it has been abolished. I hope that that deals with the fears of the hon. Member for Uxbridge.
