= Land Transfer Act 1952 =

Act of Parliament in New Zealand

Land Transfer Act

New Zealand Parliament
- Royal assent: 23 October 1952
- Status: Current legislation

The Land Transfer Act 1952 is an Act of Parliament passed in New Zealand in 1952. It implements the Torrens title system of land registration. Much of it is based on the Land Transfer Act 1885.
