= Boyd v Mayor of Wellington =

Case law in New Zealand on the concept of indefeasibility of title

Boyd v. Mayor of Wellington
- Court: Court of Appeal of New Zealand
- Decided: 1924
- Citation: [1924] NZLR 1174
- Transcript: http://www.nzlii.org/cgi-bin/sinodisp/nz/cases/NZGazLawRp/1924/58.html

Court membership
- Judges sitting: Adams J, Stout CJ, Sim J, Stringer J, Salmond J

Keywords
- mistake, indefeasibility of title

Boyd v. Mayor of Wellington [1924] NZLR 1174 is a leading case law in New Zealand on the concept of indefeasibility of title.

== Background ==
The plaintiff in this case, Mr, Boyd, owned a parcel of land in Wellington until in 1917 the local council compulsorily acquired the land under the Public Works Act [1908] to build part of the Wellington tramway system.

After the council was registered as the new owner of this property, it came to the plaintiff's attention that because there was an existing building on the property, the council had no legal right to acquire the property without the owner's consent.

The plaintiff took legal action against the council to return the land back to his ownership.

== Held ==
The court ruled in favor of the council, as the transfer was not obtained due to fraud, i.e. the council was not aware at the time that it needed the owners consent, but rather to oversight by the council, and this meant that the Wellington City Council had an indefeasible title to the property.

Footnote: Had this claim not been about real estate, it is likely that the decision would have been different.
