= European Land Information Service =

The European Land Information Service (EULIS) provides direct access to official land registers in Europe. EULIS is owned by a consortium of member countries with expertise in the area of land registration, most of which are government organisations. EULIS was an initiative led by the official bodies for land registration in European countries.

== History ==
Between 2001 and 2004, eight different European land information organisations and one university cooperated in developing a demonstrator e-platform for subscribed users of land registries with support and additional funding from the European Commission. In addition the team worked hard to produce online reference information from each participating country.

In 2004-2007, the long-term aim was to help encourage cross-border lending on the Integration of EU Mortgage Credit Markets. The three-year programme developed the demonstrator into a live service that was officially launched as a live service on 22 November 2006.

From 2007 to 2017, the EULIS portal was in the air. In May 2017 it was decided by the members to close the portal. Main reason for the closure was that EU-Commission was building a replacing portal under the Land Registers Interconnection Programme. In 2018 the EULIS organization was abolished.

=== European supporters ===
EULIS is a concept supported by various organisations in the European community. EULIS enjoys active discussion and cooperation with many of these organisations including the European Commission, European Mortgage Federation, European Land Registry Association, Eurogeographics, and the European Business Register Network.

== EULIS tools ==
The EULIS glossary and reference information assist better understanding of the local environment, not only literally but also the meaning of terminology.
