= Real Property Act 1858 =

Superseded South Australian legislation

Parliament of South Australia
- Long title: An Act to simplify the Laws relating to the transfer and encumbrance of freehold and other interests in Land
- Citation: 21 Vict. c. 15
- Passed by: Parliament of the South Australia
- Passed: 27 January 1858
- Enacted: 27 January 1858
- Commenced: 2 July 1858

Repealed by
- Real Property Act 1886

Related legislation
- Real Property Act 1860 (24 Vict. c. 11), Real Property Act 1861 (24 & 25 Vict. c. 22)
- Status: Expired

The Real Property Act 1858, 21 Vict. c. 15, is the short title of an act of the Parliament of South Australia, with the long title "An Act to simplify the Laws relating to the transfer and encumbrance of freehold and other interests in Land". After being introduced as a private member's bill by Sir Robert Richard Torrens, it was passed by both houses and assented to by the governor of South Australia, on 27 January 1858.

It was the first law in the world to institute what has become known as the Torrens Title system of property law, and is sometimes referred to as the "Torrens Title" Act 1858. The Act was repealed and replaced by the Real Property Act 1886.

== Background ==
Robert Richard Torrens, son of Robert Torrens (economist and chairman of the South Australian Colonisation Commission), had previously worked in the civil service in customs roles in London and Adelaide, before being appointed Colonial Treasurer and Registrar-General from 1852 to 1857. He was elected as a member of the House of Assembly for the City of Adelaide in the new parliament in 1857, and on 1 September 1857 became the third Premier, although his government lasted only a month.

For years before his election, he had vigorously promoted the need for land titles reform, with the current system of transfer of land by deed ineffective, slow, expensive and insecure. It relied on verbose and complicated documents that had to be retained at least a century in order to validate new transactions and lawyers were needed to effect the transactions. The second reading of a bill introduced as a private member's bill was carried despite strong opposition, passing through both Houses on 27 January 1858.

== Enactment ==
The Real Property Act 1858, with the long title "An Act to simplify the Laws relating to the transfer and encumbrance of freehold and other interests in Land", was assented to on 27 January 1858. At the head of the first page of the transcript, is "Anno vicesimo primo Victoriae Reginae, No. 15", meaning the 21st year of Queen Victoria's reign, (Note: Victoria reigned from 1837. Latin translation here. Chapter would have been 21 Vict. c. 15) although the first page of the original document says "1857–8, No. 15".

The act, eagerly anticipated by many, came into effect on 2 July 1858 and was on the whole well-received, apart from some lawyers who would have noted that the ease and clarity of the process would mean less in earnings for them in the future. Torrens was to be appointed Registrar-General in order to assist with the act's application. In this role he did much to bring about a successful transition to the new system. Temporary offices were set up for applicants to apply to have land brought under the operation of the new act.

An indexed copy of the act was published in 1858, edited by W.M. Sandford. (Note: Nothing found on this Sandford - does not appear to be related to Alexander Wallace Sandford, who only came to Adelaide in the 1880s.)

== Effect ==
The act transferred property by registration of title, instead of by deeds. It radically altered the method of recording and registering land under freehold title. Instead, government certificates were issued and a central register established. This system provided an indisputable record, thus almost eliminating litigation involving land disputes, got rid of difficulties created by lost certificates, and reduced the cost of land sales and transfers. The legislation was refined in the following few years, with Torrens overseeing major amendments to the act in 1859 and 1862, which included allowing the licensing of registered land brokers instead of lawyers in land transactions, thus further reducing the cost.

Four main principles underlie the act:

- Title to land is passed from one owner to another by registration on a public register.
- Title is evidenced by a government-issued and -guaranteed certificate issued.
- Once registered, the purchase is indefeasible; it cannot be set aside unless fraud is proven on the part of the purchaser.
- Land dealers who have been dispossessed of their land unfairly or accidentally are guaranteed compensation.

== Spread and current legislation ==
The first sale of land registered under the system was to pastoralist William Ransom Mortlock (later elected to the House of Assembly) on 25 August 1858.

So successful was the outcome that it was adopted in the rest of Australia and in many countries throughout the world. The system became known as the Torrens Title system, and the act often referred to as the "Torrens Title Act 1858".

Torrens visited Victoria in 1860 and assisted in bringing in the new system in that colony. He also helped the other colonies to introduce their own variations of the system: Queensland adopted the 1859 version, while New South Wales, Tasmania and Victoria based their legislation on the 1861 reforms. New Zealand, Malaysia and some states in the US followed; it has since been widely adopted throughout the world.

In 1862, Torrens published A handy book on the Real Property Act of South Australia:..., which is now available in full online.

=== Amendments and revisions ===
The Real Property Act 1860 (23 & 24 Vict. c. 11), "An Act to consolidate and amend certain Acts relating to the transfer ad encumbrance of freehold and other interests in land" (17 October 1860) and the Real Property Act 1861 (24 & 25 Vict. c. 22), "An Act to amend the Real Property Act of 1860" (3 December 1861) were the main amendments to the Act.

In South Australia, the act was substantially revised in 1886, and this version remains in force in South Australia. The Real Property Act 1886, updated 3 October 2019, has a long title "An Act to consolidate and amend the Real Property Act 1861, the Real Property Act Amendment Act 1878 and the Rights-of-Way Act 1881, and for other purposes".

=== Computerisation ===
South Australia has been a world leader in creating digital versions of property title data since the late 20th century, with its Land Ownership and Tenure System, or LOTS.

== Credit for the act ==
Attempts have been made to minimise the credit due to Torrens for his great achievement, and it has been asserted that Anthony Forster, then editor of the South Australian Register, made the original suggestion. In the preface to his book, The South Australian System of Conveyancing by Registration of Title, published at Adelaide in 1859, Torrens stated that his interest in the question had been aroused 22 years before through the misfortunes of a relation and friend, and that he had been working on the problem for many years. He also said that the idea was based on principles used in transferring shipping property, of which he would have gained experience in his early career as a customs official, both in London and Adelaide (1836–1852). His experience as Registrar-General (1852–1858), as a landowner himself, and the influence of politicians such as Forster and W.H. Burford and lawyers such as Richard Bullock Andrews, Henry Gawler and W.C. Belt, would have influenced him close to home.

Torrens acknowledged that he had adapted principles from other systems: the system of title registration had been used pre-14th-century Europe, and his research revealed that Bavaria, Austria and Hungary had engaged in this practice for centuries. However, he did not copy those ones, but adapted a system developed for registration of merchant ships in Britain. The owner of the ship was given a certificate, which was surrendered to the registrar when the ship was sold, and the new owner would receive a new one.

Torrens was also familiar with a report presented to the British House of Commons on 15 May 1857, supplied by German lawyer Ulrich Hübbe who had detailed knowledge of the real property laws of the Hanseatic League cities and whose doctorate in laws from Hamburg University dealt with this topic. His input added to the practical application of the method in law, and Torrens worked on this aspect further. With the support of Carl Muecke and the influential German community, he fought it through Parliament despite virulent opposition from the legal profession.
