= Bona fide purchaser =

Common law term in property law

A bona fide purchaser (BFP) – referred to more completely as a bona fide purchaser for value without notice – is a term used predominantly in common law jurisdictions in the law of real property and personal property to refer to an innocent party who purchases property without notice of any other party's claim to the title of that property. A BFP must purchase for value, meaning that they must pay for the property rather than simply be the beneficiary of a gift. Even when a party fraudulently conveys property to a BFP (for example, by selling to the BFP property that has already been conveyed to someone else), that BFP will, depending on the laws of the relevant jurisdiction, take good (valid) title to the property despite the competing claims of the other party. As such, an owner publicly recording their own interests (which in some types of property must be on a court-recognised Register) protects themselves from losing those to an indirect buyer, such as a qualifying buyer from a thief, who qualifies as a BFP. Moreover, so-called "race-notice" jurisdictions require the BFP to record (depending on the type of property by public notice or applying for registration) to enforce their rights. In any case, parties with a claim to ownership of the property will retain a cause of action (a right to sue) against the party who made the fraudulent conveyance.

== England and Wales ==
In England and Wales and other jurisdictions following the 20th century oft-repeated precedent, the BFP will not be bound by equitable interests of which they do not have actual, constructive, or imputed notice, as long as they have made "such inspections as ought reasonably to have been made".

BFPs are also sometimes referred to as "equity's darling". However, jurist Hackney explains that the portrayal is inaccurate. In cases where legal title is passed to a bona fide purchaser for value without notice, equity does not show the purchaser any great affection in accepting the transfer. Rather, it recognises that it has no jurisdiction over the question of legal title, which belongs to the common law. The relationship between the courts of equity and the BFP is at root characterised as, geared toward the BFP, with benign neglect of the old owner(s). However, equity allows a proven BFP to claim for a full legal conveyance from former legal owner, failing which the court itself will convey title.

== United States ==
In the United States, the patent law codifies the bona fide purchaser rule, 35 U.S.C. § 261. Unlike the common law, the statute cuts off both equitable and legal claims to the title.

== See also ==
- Market overt
- Nemo dat quod non habet
- Title insurance in the United States
