= Grant (law) =

Transfer of property

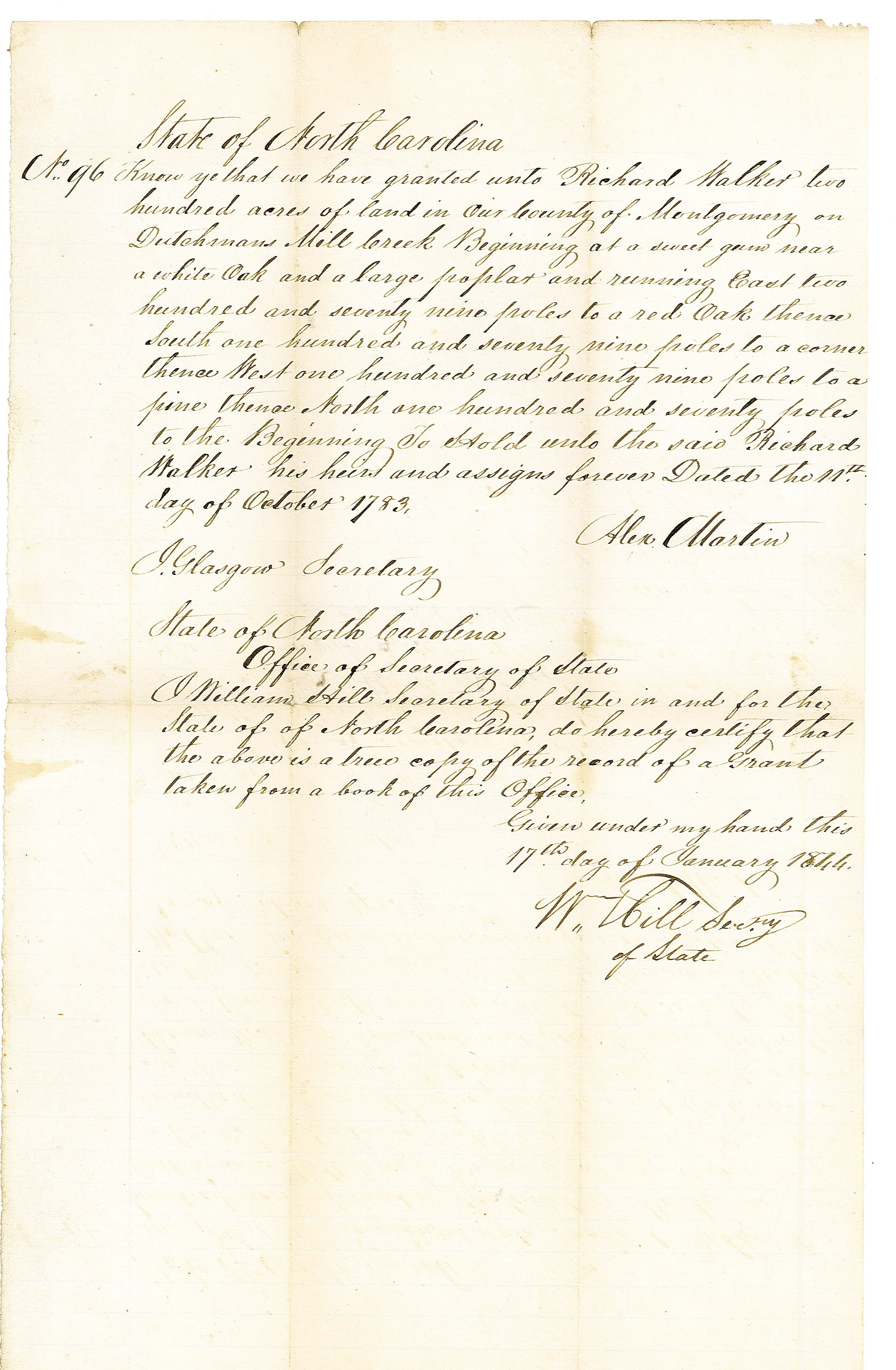
Early American land grant (1783) from North Carolina

A grant, in law, is a transfer of property, generally from a person or other entity giving the property (the grantor) to a person or entity receiving the property (the grantee).

Historically, a grant was a transfer by deed of that which could not be passed by livery, an act evidenced by letters patent under the Great Seal, granting something from the king to a subject, and a technical term made use of in deeds of conveyance of lands to import a transfer.

Though the word "grant" was originally made use of, in treating of conveyances of interests in lands, to denote a transfer by deed of that which could not be passed by livery, and was applied only to incorporeal hereditaments, it became a generic term, applicable to the transfer of all classes of real property.

As distinguished from a mere license, a grant passes some estate or interest, corporeal or incorporeal, in the lands which it embraces; can only he made by an instrument in writing, under seal; and is irrevocable, when made, unless an express power of revocation is reserved. A license is a mere authority; passes no estate or interest whatever; may be made by parol; is revocable at will; and, when revoked, the protection which it gave ceases to exist.

In legal conveyancing, the grant is the means by which a party conveys title or encumbrance. In trust law, the grant is the act by which the settlor creates the trust for the interests of the trustee. In an option contract, the right of the optionee to exercise the option is considered a grant on the part of the optionor. In philanthropy, a donor may provide a grant of money.

== See also ==
- Grantor-grantee index
- Grant (disambiguation)
- Donor
