= Torrens title =

Land registration and land transfer system

Torrens title is a land registration and land transfer system in which a state creates and maintains a register of land holdings, which serves as the conclusive evidence (termed "indefeasibility") of title of the person recorded on the register as the proprietor (owner), and of all other interests recorded on the register.

Ownership of land is transferred by registration of a transfer of title, instead of by the use of deeds. The Registrar provides a Certificate of Title to the new proprietor, which is merely a copy of the related folio of the register. The main benefit of the system is to enhance certainty of title to land and to simplify dealings involving land.

Its name derives from Sir Robert Richard Torrens (1812–1884), who designed, lobbied for and introduced the private member's bill which was enacted as the Real Property Act 1858 in the colony of South Australia, the first version of Torrens title enacted in the world. Torrens based his proposal on many of the ideas of Ulrich Hübbe, a German lawyer living in South Australia. The system has been adopted by many countries and has been adapted to cover other interests, including credit interests (such as mortgages), leaseholds and strata titles.

== Overview ==
The Torrens title system operates on the principle of "title by registration" (granting the high indefeasibility of a registered ownership) rather than "registration of title". The system does away with the need for proving a chain of title (i.e., tracing title back in time through a series of documents). The State guarantees title, and the system is usually supported by a compensation scheme for those who lose their title due to private fraud or error in the State's operation.

In most jurisdictions that have implemented a Torrens title system, there will be parcels of land which are still unregistered.

The Torrens system works on three principles:

1. Mirror principle – the register reflects (mirrors) accurately and completely the current facts about title to each registered lot. This means that each dealing affecting a lot (such as a transfer of title, a mortgage or discharge of same, a lease, an easement or a covenant) must be entered on the register and so be viewable by anyone.
2. Curtain principle – one does not need to go behind the Certificate of Title as it contains all the information about the title. This means that ownership need not be proved by long complicated documents that are kept by the owner, as in the Private Conveyancing system. All of the necessary information regarding ownership is on the Certificate of Title.
3. Indemnity principle – provides for compensation of loss caused by private fraud or by errors made by the Registrar of Titles.

== Background ==
=== Common law ===
At common law, the vendor of land needs to show his or her ownership of the land by tracing the chain of ownership back to the earliest grant of land by the Crown to its first owner. The documents relating to transactions with the land are collectively known as the "title deeds" or the "chain of title". This event may have occurred hundreds of years prior and could have had dozens of intervened changes in the land's ownership. A person's ownership over land could also be challenged, potentially causing great legal expense to land owners and hindering development.

Even an exhaustive title search of the chain of title would not give the purchaser complete security, largely because of the principle, nemo dat quod non habet ("no one gives what he does not have") and the ever-present possibility of undetected outstanding interests. In Pilcher v Rawlins (1872), in the Court of Chancery in England and Wales, the vendor conveyed the fee-simple estate to P1, but retained the title deeds and fraudulently purported to convey the fee-simple estate to P2. The latter could receive only the title retained by the vendor—in short, nothing. However, the case was ultimately decided in favor of P2, over P1. The courts of equity could not bring themselves to decide against a totally innocent (without notice) purchaser.

The common-law position has been changed in minor respects by legislation designed to minimize the searches that should be undertaken by a prospective purchaser. In some jurisdictions, a limitation has been placed on the period of commencement of title a purchaser may require.

=== Deeds registration ===
The effect of registration under the deeds registration system (also known as "record title") was to give the instrument registered "priority" over all instruments that are either unregistered or not registered until later. The recording of the deed served to give notice to the world of the conveyance of title to the grantee named in the deed. The basic difference between the deeds registration and Torrens systems is that the former involves registration of instruments while the latter involves registration of title.

Moreover, though a register of who owned what land was maintained, it was unreliable and could be challenged in the courts at any time. The limits of the deeds-registration system meant that transfers of land were slow, expensive, and often unable to create certain title.

== Creation ==
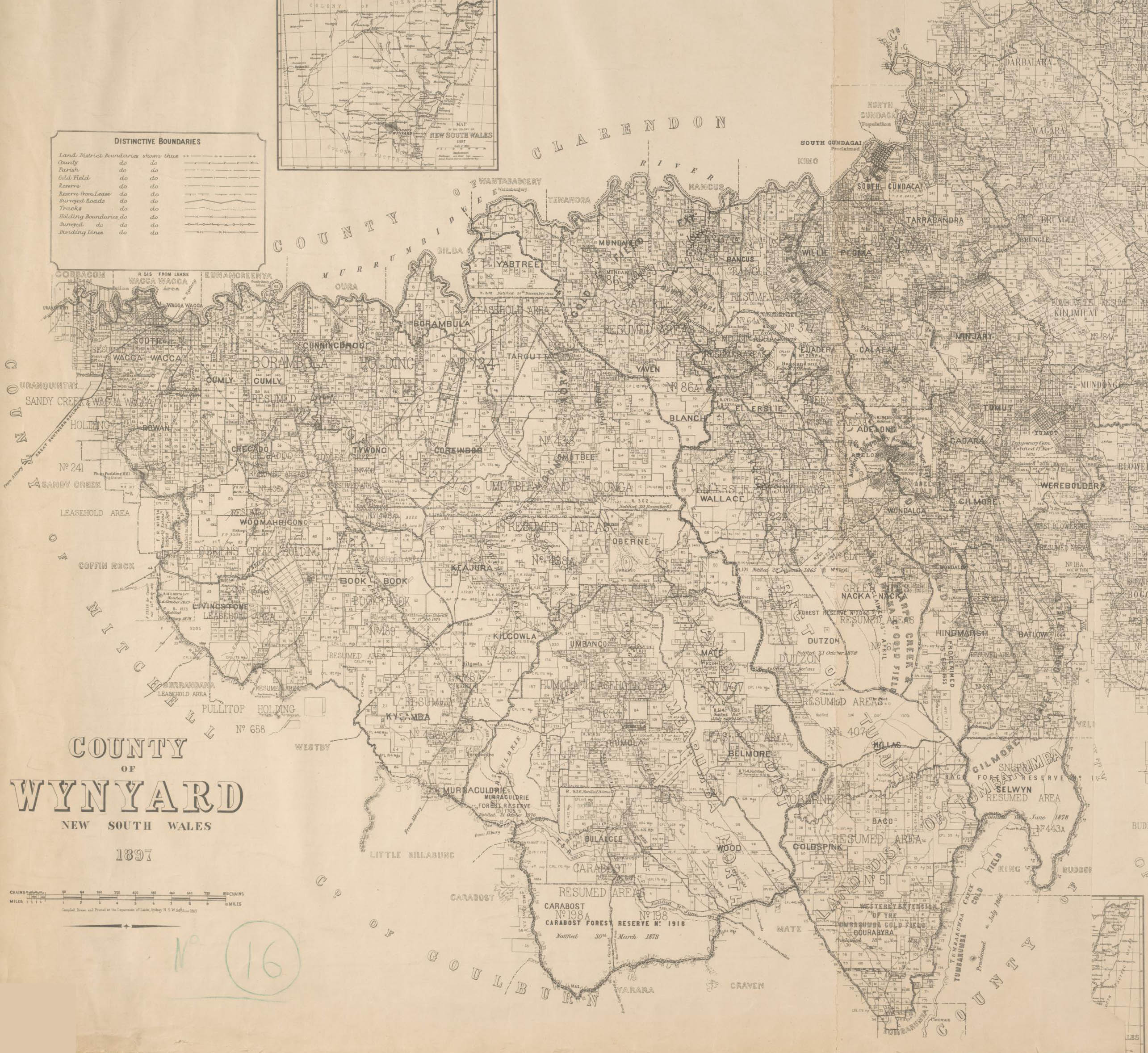
Under the system many maps showing Australian property boundaries need to be kept.

Sir Robert Richard Torrens, Registrar-General and Treasurer of the colony of South Australia and later a member of the House of Assembly, lobbied for many years for a new title system to improve the currently cumbersome, slow and expensive system of land transfer. He was largely responsible for shepherding the new Bill through Parliament, enacted in 1858 as the Real Property Act 1858. The system laid out in this bill became known as the Torrens title system, and was based on a central registry of all the land in the jurisdiction of South Australia.

Torrens drew ideas from the system of registration of merchant ships in the United Kingdom, experience gained from his years of working as a customs official. He also used many of the ideas incorporated in the Act from Ulrich Hübbe, a German lawyer living in South Australia at that time, who had expert knowledge of the Hanseatic registration system in Hamburg.

== Land register ==
The central aspect of the Torrens system is the land register, in which all dealings with land are recorded. The register may be a bound paper record, but today most registers are typically kept in a database. Ownership of the land is established by virtue of the owner's name being recorded in the government's register. The Torrens title also records easements and the creation and discharge of mortgages.

On the first registration of land under the system, the land is given a unique number (called a volume-folio number) which identifies the land by reference to a registered plan. The folio records the dimensions of the land and its boundaries, the name of the registered owner, and any legal interests that affect title to the land. To change the boundaries of a parcel of land, a revised plan must be prepared and registered. Once registered, the land cannot be withdrawn from the system.

A transfer of ownership of a parcel of land is effected by a change of the record on the register. The registrar has a duty to ensure that only legally valid changes are made to the register. To this end, the registrar will indicate what documentation he or she will require to be satisfied that there has in fact been a change of ownership. A change of ownership may come about because of a sale of the land, or the death of the registered owner, or as a result of a court order, to name only the most common ways that ownership may change. Similarly, any interest which affects or limits the ownership rights of the registered owner, such as a mortgage, can also be noted on the register. There are legal rules which regulate the rights and powers of each of these interests in relation to each other and in relation to third parties.

The State guarantees the accuracy of the register and undertakes to compensate those whose rights are adversely affected by an administrative error. Claims for compensation are very rare.

== Effect of registration ==
The main difference between a common law title and a Torrens title is that a member of the general community, acting in good faith, can rely on the information on the land register as to the rights and interests of parties recorded there, and act on the basis of that information. A prospective purchaser, for example, is not required to look beyond that record. He or she does not need even to examine the Certificate of Title, the register information being paramount. This contrasts with a common law title, which is based on the principle that a vendor cannot transfer to a purchaser a greater interest than he or she owns. As with a chain, the seller's title is as good as the weakest link of the chain of title. Accordingly, if a vendor's common law title were defective in any way, so would be the purchaser's title. Hence, it is incumbent on the purchaser to ensure that the vendor's title is beyond question. This may involve both inquiries and an examination of the chain of title, which can be a protracted and costly exercise each time there is a dealing in the property.

The registered proprietor of Torrens land is said to have an indefeasible title, which means that his or her title can be challenged only in very limited circumstances (see following).

== Indefeasibility of title ==
The register of titles is said to confer “indefeasibility of title” to the person or persons registered on the register as proprietor or joint proprietors of land. Although the concept of indefeasibility is similar to that of conclusive evidence, in practice there are some limitations to indefeasibility, and different jurisdictions have different laws and provisions.

For example, in the Australian state of Victoria, the Torrens system is manifested in the Transfer of Land Act 1958 (Vic). Upon registration of an interest and subsequent recording on title of the interest, the registered owner's claim to that interest is superior to all other claims other than those listed in s.42 of that Act, which provides that the title of the registered interest holder is subject to, among other things:

- those listed on the title,
- those claiming the land on a prior folio (s.42(1)(a)),
- where the land is included by wrong description on the part of the Registrar and the proprietor is not or has not derived title from a purchaser ‘for value’ (s.42(1)(b),
- “paramount interests” (s.42(2)(a)-(f)) – these interests, although even possibly unregistered, are 'superior' to interests that are registered.

Additionally, there are other exceptions or circumstances that can defeat indefeasibility, such as:

- fraud committed by the registered interest holder [principle of immediate indefeasibility]. See, for example, the New Zealand case of Efstratiou, Glantschnig, and Petrovic v Glantschnig,
- judicial action, where it can be shown that there was some contractual promise or undertaking by the registered party vis-à-vis the unregistered party,
- inconsistent legislation (in which case the most recent legislation prevails),
- volunteer, where the registering party acquires the interest for no consideration (e.g. bequeathed in a will). By contrast, in New South Wales volunteers are entitled to indefeasibility.

== Adoption ==
=== Australia ===
The first sale of land registered under the system was to pastoralist William Ransom Mortlock (later elected to the South Australian House of Assembly) on 25 August 1858.

Starting in South Australia with the Real Property Act 1858 (which was later repealed and replaced by the Real Property Act 1886), all Australian colonies introduced the Torrens system between 1858 and 1875. Since then, each colony, and since 1901, state or territory, has maintained its own land titles register of land.

The Torrens system did not replace the common law system but applied only to land grants effected after the introduction of the Torrens system in the jurisdiction and to land that was voluntarily registered under the relevant Act. In Australia most land is now held under the Torrens system, although remnants of the old system of land title still remain, called “General law land”. All land in the Australian Capital Territory is leasehold (effectively Torrens freehold), while much of the Northern Territory is held under Crown lease. Native Title is recognised as a separate form of ownership. Some land remains as Crown Land.

=== Canada ===
The second Torrens jurisdiction in the world was established in 1861 in the then-British colony of Vancouver Island, now part of the Canadian province of British Columbia. Canada, through the federal Parliament in 1886, implemented the Torrens system in the Northwest Territories. It has continued to be used by the three Prairie provinces (Alberta, Saskatchewan and Manitoba) into which the southern part of the Northwest Territories was divided. British Columbia uses a modified Torrens system. Since 1885, Ontario has used an English system, which is not a Torrens system, but it has similar purposes. In Ontario, electronic registration led to this version covering almost all land, but the past deeds registration still governs some issues. For properties still under deeds registration, a 40-year rule governed title, but the government converted them under a streamlined process. New Brunswick and Nova Scotia converted from a Deeds registration system to a Torrens title system in the 2000s, with the expense of the changeover charged to the purchaser. The only provinces in Canada which do not have Torrens titles include Newfoundland and Labrador, Prince Edward Island, and Quebec. Quebec uses the cadastre system under the civil law jurisdiction rather than the common law jurisdiction.

=== Fiji ===
Fiji's Torrens statute is the Land Transfer Act 1971.

=== Dominican Republic ===
The Dominican Republic has been using the Torrens Title System since 1920. All of commercial property and most real estate within the main cities are registered and thus guaranteed under the system. An acceleration of registration for land in the rural areas is underway in the 21st century, to promote a more efficient and effective real estate market in the Dominican Republic.

=== Ireland ===
Ireland first began to operate a Torrens Title system in 1892. So-called registered land (i.e. land held under a Torrens title) is recorded in the Republic of Ireland using a system of numbered county-level folios. The land registry is operated by Tailte Éireann, a government agency, and records both freehold and leasehold titles, along with easements/profits-a-prendre, mortgages, and any other charges over land. It is compulsory to create a folio in the land registry if land is sold/transferred/subdivided, multi-storey buildings are erected, or a new lease (over five years) is created. The vast majority of land in Ireland (by acreage) is held under Torrens title as compulsory registration in the land registry upon sale has been a requirement in rural areas for many years. Compulsory registration was extended to the (more urban) counties of Cork, Dublin, Galway, Limerick and Waterford in 2010, thus extending mandatory Torrens title to every part of the Republic of Ireland.

=== Israel ===
A Torrens title system was implemented by the British in Mandatory Palestine, and has continued in use since Israel's foundation in 1948. As of 2016, about 4% of the country's land area is still registered under a pre-Torrens, deeds registration system.

=== Malaysia ===
Malaysia has adopted three versions of the Torrens system:

- For Peninsular Malaysia, this is enacted in the National Land Code, Act 56 of 1965.
- For the state of Sarawak, this is enacted in the Sarawak Land Code, Chapter 81 of 1958.
- For the state of Sabah, this is enacted in the Land Ordinance (Sabah Chapter 68). Unlike the National Land Code and the Sarawak Land Code, the Land Ordinance (Sabah Chapter 68) does not provide any indefeasibility of title.

=== New Zealand ===
New Zealand adopted a similar system from 1870 under the Land Transfer Act, 1870. The Land Transfer (Compulsory Registration of Titles) Act 1924 brought most of the remaining land in the country under the Torrens system and by 1951 the register was considered complete, although small remnants of land may still exist under the deeds system. The Land Transfer Act 1952 further implemented the Torrens system. In the 20th century, academics and judges disagreed about whether to interpret indefeasibility as "deferred" or "immediate". In 1967, the Privy Council in Frazer v Walker decided that a registered owner will obtain an indefeasible title to an interest or estate as soon as they become the registered owner of the interest or estate (the principle of immediate indefeasibility).

The 1952 Act was superseded by the Land Transfer Act 2017. The 2017 Act introduces a judicial discretion to cancel an owner's registration of title in cases of "manifest injustice", which arguably frustrates the certainty of title considered fundamental to the principle of immediate indefeasibility.

In New Zealand most land is held under the Torrens Title system, although remnants of the old system of land title still remain. Māori customary title (native title) is recognised as a separate form of ownership. Some land remains as Crown Land (i.e. in New Zealand, public land).

=== Philippines ===
The Torrens system was established in the Philippines on 6 November 1902, by the enactment of Act No. 496, "The Land Registration Act", which was virtually identical to the Real Property Act of Massachusetts of 1898.

=== Russia ===
Russia adopted the Torrens system soon after the founding of the Soviet Union. Currently, the accounting and registration system for rights to immovable property in Russia is governed by two federal laws, which have adopted some of the elements and principles of the Torrens system. Accounting for land, buildings and natural sites is recorded in a database of real estate cadastre under federal law of 2007 No. 221-FZ "On State Real Estate Cadastre". Transactions by the account holder of these facilities is recorded in another database: “the Unified State Register of rights to immovable property and transactions with them” on the basis of federal law of 1997 No. 122-FZ "On State Registration of Rights to Real Estate and Transactions Therewith". Both laws established openness cadastre and registry information, and assigned to a single organization responsible for their management - Rosreestr . Entry in the Unified State Register of real property rights is a necessary and sufficient condition for the emergence of property rights to real estate. For information about the property, contained in the cadastre and registry, sufficiently detailed and structured cover most essential information about an object runs open cadastral map. With a fairly simple web forms can be found and read a part of the information on any object property. These laws are not, however, establish an immediate full liability of the state for the correctness of the information contained in databases. In 2015, the State Duma has been registered a bill that covers public access to information about the owners of the property. The bill was supported by the Government. According to some experts, the restriction of information openness reduces the chances of identifying the public cases of illegal enrichment and increases business risks.

=== Saudi Arabia ===
Saudi Arabia introduced a Torrens system in 2002 with The Realty in Kind Registration Law, issued by Royal Decree No. 6 on 9/21423H

=== Singapore ===
Singapore adopted a version of the Torrens system beginning in 1960 with the Land Titles Act, Chapter 157. Conversion of all titles was completed in 2001.

=== Sri Lanka ===
Sri Lanka has introduced a version of the Torrens system known as Bim Saviya under the Registration of Title Act No. 21 of 1998. The Survey Department of Sri Lanka had started the process of surveying government and private own land for the entry into the Bim Saviya registration. As of date the process has not finished in land surveying and converting land owners original deeds into Certificate of Titles. The program has become highly controversial, with claims that it mirrors the reclamation of crown land by the British colonial government of Ceylon under the Prevention of Encroachments upon Crown Lands Ordinance No 12 of 1840 with the government taking over ownership of land its occupants cannot prove ownership of and the high possibility of fraud, lack of recognition of Certificate of Title issued under the Bim Saviya program and the lack of provisions for co-ownership.

=== Thailand ===
Thailand adopted the Torrens system in 1901 after King Chulalongkorn established The Royal Thai Survey Department, a Special Services Group of the Royal Thai Armed Forces, engaged in Cadastral survey, which is the survey of specific land parcels to define ownership for land registration, and for equitable taxation.

=== Turkey ===
Turkey adopted the Torrens system in 1926 under the new Turkish Civil Code. The land registration system in the Ottoman Empire was based on title recording. After the Republic of Turkey was founded in 1923, the government implemented the Torrens title registration and transfer system on 4 October 1926, as mandated by Article 19 of the Turkish Civil Code.

=== United States ===
Proposals to implement Torrens title systems in the United States have been strenuously opposed by the title insurance industry. The high initial cost of Torrens registration is another barrier to the system's implementation.

The Torrens system is used in the U.S. territory of Guam. States with a limited implementation include Minnesota, Massachusetts, Colorado, Georgia, Hawaii, New York, North Carolina, and Ohio. Previously, Virginia and Washington implemented it, however the system has since been repealed in these states.

The state of Illinois was the first state to adopt a Torrens Title Act, which used a limited Torrens system in Cook County after the Great Chicago Fire, but the system was allowed to expire on 1 January 1992, after it was found to be unpopular with lenders and other institutions.

California adopted the Torrens System in 1914 pursuant to an initiative statute. Although participation in the system was voluntary, once an owner had registered his land, he could not withdraw from the system. The Torrens System, as adopted in California, did not protect buyers from defects caused by federal tax liens, federal bankruptcy proceedings, or from incompetency, divorce, or probate proceedings affecting the seller. Since the system had been adopted by initiative, the legislature had no authority to correct those deficiencies. By an initiative adopted in 1954, the legislature was given authority to amend or repeal the system, and, in 1955, it was repealed.

Virginia enacted a Torrens system option. However, it never became popular and the Torrens Act was abolished in 2019. Record title is now the only form of land title registration in Virginia. Washington had voluntary Torrens registration until June 2022, at which time new registrations were discontinued. Existing registrations were terminated on 1 July 2023.

== See also ==
- Cadastre, the equivalent concept in the French civil law
- Strata title, an enhancement of Torrens Title intended for apartment buildings and house-typed units.
