= Land registration =

Process of recording land rights

Land registration is any of various systems by which matters concerning ownership, possession, or other rights in land are formally recorded (usually with a government agency or department) to provide evidence of title, facilitate transactions, and prevent unlawful disposal. The information recorded and the protection provided by land registration varies widely by jurisdiction.

In common law countries, particularly in jurisdictions in the Commonwealth of Nations, when replacing the deeds registration system, title registrations are broadly classified into two basic types: the Torrens title system and the English system, a modified version of the Torrens system.

Cadastral systems and land registration are both types of land recording and complement each other.

== Implementations ==
=== Americas ===
==== Falkland Islands ====
The Falkland Islands registry holds copies of all Crown Grants from 1844.

==== United States ====
Land registration is a matter for individual states in the USA. Thus each state will define the officials, authorities, and their functions and duties with respect to the ownership of land within that state, as is more fully described in the specified main article.

=== Europe ===
==== Finland ====
Finland operates a cadastral system operated by the National Land Survey of Finland (Finnish: Maanmittauslaitos, MML).

==== France ====
The French system uses a cadastre, maintained by the French public land registry. The plans are boundaries of land parcels but do not provide details of the land owner or precise boundaries.

==== Germany ====
§ 873.1 of the German Civil Code stipulates that the transfer of ownership of a plot of land, the encumbrance of a plot of land with a right and the transfer or encumbrance of such a right requires registration in the Land Register (Grundbuch). Except for the cases explicitly provided for by law, the respective agreement becomes binding only upon its registration. Land used for purposes in the public interest is exempt from this requirement.

==== Ireland ====
Land registration is compulsory in the Republic of Ireland, and two parallel registries are maintained: the Land Registry (Clárlann na Talún in Irish) and the Registry of Deeds (Clárlann na nGníomhas).

The system in Ireland follows the English system, but with features typical of the Torrens system (for example, anyone can inspect the register). Robert Torrens himself drafted the Record of Title (Ireland) Act, 1865 in order to record titles conveyed. The Landed Estates Court a register, the "Record of Title". While the record was not open to the public, the index could be inspected by anyone, today the index and folios can be viewed by anyone with an administration charge. Recording of title under the Act was voluntary and this was one of the reasons why the Act proved ineffective.

The Land Registry has been dealing with the registration of all transactions (purchase, sale, mortgage, remortgage and other burdens) concerning registered land since 1892, and issued land certificates which are a state guarantee of the registered owner's good title up to 1 January 2007. Land Certificates have been abolished by virtue of Section 23 of the Registration of Deeds and Title Act, 2006. Every piece of land in the register – which is arranged by county — is granted a folio number, under which all transactions pertaining to the land can be examined on request and after payment of a fee, currently €5 (as of June 2020). Approximately 90% of land by area, and 85% of title, is registered.

The Registry of Deeds has since 1708 dealt with the registration of wills, marriage settlements, title deeds, mortgage documents and other documentation concerning granting of title over land. It was originally set up to enforce the legislation regarding ownership of land by Catholics. A registered deed took precedence over an unregistered deed. Original deeds and their schedules were not retained by the registry, but rather detailed summaries (called "memorials") of conveyancing and mortgage documents are stamped and filed by the registrar. These documents are generally signed by at least one of the parties and one of the witnesses of the deeds. No certificates or guarantees of title are issued: the registry merely endeavours to provide information concerning the deeds lodged against a certain property – and, crucially, the order in which they were lodged – such as the last named owner or the latest mortgage to be lodged.

Both registries are managed by the Property Registration Authority. The Registry of Deeds occupies one site, namely one half of the King's Inns building on Henrietta Street, Dublin and the Land Registry has offices in Dublin, Waterford and in Roscommon, with its head office situated in the Four Courts, Dublin. Prior to COVID-19, both were freely accessible to the public and did not require an appointment to visit, but now do. Since the Republic of Ireland gained independence in 1922, its registries have only dealt with the land comprised in its 26 counties (formerly the Irish Free State, 1922–37). Since 1922, the remaining 6 counties of Northern Ireland have their own separate register of land now being administered by the Land and Property Services in the Northern Ireland Department of Finance and Personnel. However, the Registry of Deeds in Dublin still holds and provides memorials relating to the 6 Northern Irish counties for the time period 1708–1922.

Recording of title under recent legislative changes is now compulsory. Public access to the index and folios is limited to individuals who have an account with the Property Registration Authority.

The Property Registration Authority in Ireland is connected to the European Land Information Service EULIS.

The authority was merged into the newly established Tailte Éireann in 2023.

==== Lithuania ====
The land register (nekilnojamojo turto registras) contains factual data (area, height, volume, year of construction and owner name) and legal data (agreements of joint ownership, court rulings, easement, mortgages) on immovable property such as land and buildings.

A sale agreement on real estate is legally binding even without registration in the land register, the only requirement being certification of the agreement by a notary. Registration is required, however, in order for the new owner to sell or otherwise transfer the property, or enter a mortgage. Furthermore, only registration makes the transfer opposable to third parties.

==== Poland ====
The land and mortgage register system in Poland is public and accessible online. According to art. 25 of Land and Mortgage Act it provides an official and structured register of rights to real estate, divided into four sections: designation of real estate and related rights (I), information on the owner or perpetual usufructuary (II), limited property rights and claims (III) and mortgages (IV). The principle rules of Polish real estate law is the presumption of conformity of land and mortgage entries with reality – rights disclosed are considered to exist, and those deleted are considered non-existent. Also a public credibility principle protects buyers acting in good faith on the basis of information entered in the land register, even if the register does not reflect the actual legal status. However, this protection does not apply to gratuitous transactions or purchasers acting in bad faith. In addition, certain rights, such as statutory encumbrances or easements established by law, are effective regardless of their entry in the register.

==== Russia ====
Advantages of the Torrens system were seen in Russia almost immediately after its occurrence, but scrapped the Russian legal system for the overthrow of the Russian Provisional Government and the dispersal of the Russian Constituent Assembly did all ideas Russian imperial jurists consigned to history. Now operating the system of accounting and registration of rights to immovable property in Russia can not be called a complete system or Torrens cadastral system, although some of its elements and principles correspond to the Torrens title. Accounting for land, buildings and natural sites organized in Russia in the database of real estate cadastre of the State on the basis of a federal law in 2007 No. 221-FZ "On State Real Estate Cadastre". The account holder of these facilities is conducted in another database: the Unified State Register of Real Estate and transactions with them on the basis of a federal law in 1997 No. 122-FZ "On State Registration of Rights to Real Estate and Transactions Therewith". Both laws established openness cadastre and registry information, and assigned to a single organization responsible for their management – Rosreestr. Entry in the Unified State Register of Real Estate is a necessary and sufficient condition for the emergence of property rights to real estate. For information about the property, contained in the cadastre and registry, sufficiently detailed and structured cover most essential information about an object runs open cadastral map. With a fairly simple web forms can be found and read a part of the information on any object property. These laws are not, however, establish an immediate full liability of the state for the correctness of the information contained in databases. In 2015, the State Duma has been registered a bill that covers public access to information about the owners of the property. The bill was supported by the Government. According to some experts, the restriction of information openness reduces the chances of identifying the public cases of illegal enrichment and increases business risks.

==== United Kingdom ====
In the United Kingdom there are several land registers, including HM Land Registry for England and Wales, Registers of Scotland, and Land and Property Services in Northern Ireland.

===== England and Wales =====
A national system of land registration was first attempted in England and Wales under the Land Registration Act 1862, a register having operated for the county of Middlesex (excluding the City of London) since 1709. This voluntary national system proved ineffective and, following further attempts in 1875 and 1897, the present system was brought into force by the Land Registration Act 1925. It is operated by HM Land Registry.

Over time various areas of the country were designated areas of compulsory registration by order so in different parts of the country compulsory registration has been around longer than in others. The last order was made in 1990, so now virtually all transactions in land result in compulsory registration. One difference is land changing ownership after death, where land is gifted rather than sold; these became compulsorily registrable only in April 1998. Similarly it became compulsory to register land when a mortgage is created on it in 1998.

The Land Registration Act 2002 leaves the 1925 system substantially in place but enables the future compulsory introduction of electronic conveyancing using electronic signatures to transfer and register property.

The Land Registry is connected to the European Land Information Service EULIS.

Details of registrations are available to any person upon payment of the prescribed fees. Precautionary measures have been introduced in recent years to verify the identity of persons attempting to change records of title. No details will be on record for any land which has not had a relevant transaction recorded as will often occur if, for example, ownership was last transferred before the introduction of compulsory registration in a particular area. Public access to the title and filed plans in pdf format is available for a fee at Land Registry of England and Wales. Public access to a digital version of the boundaries on aerial photography is available at Land Registry UK - Map Search.

A legal boundary deals with the precise separation of ownership of land. It is an invisible line dividing one person's land from another's. It does not have thickness or width and usually, but not always, falls somewhere in or along a physical boundary feature such as a wall, fence or hedge. The exact positions of the legal boundaries are almost never shown on registered title plans and are not shown on Ordnance Survey maps.

In a joint statement between Land Registry (England and Wales) and Ordnance Survey they state that:

This title plan shows the general position of the boundaries: it does not show the exact line of the boundaries. Measurements scaled from this plan may not match measurements between the same points on the ground.

===== Scotland =====
Scotland is one of the first countries in the world to have a system of land registration. Land registration commenced in Scotland with the creation of the "Register of Sasines" by the Registration Act 1617.

For full discussion, see Land Registration (Scots law)

===== Northern Ireland =====
Land registration in Northern Ireland is operated by Land and Property Services, an executive agency within the Department of Finance and Personnel for Northern Ireland. Prior to 1 April 2007 it was dealt with by the Land Registers Northern Ireland government agency.

=== Asia ===
==== Hong Kong ====
The Hong Kong Land Registry administers the Land Registration Ordinance and provides facilities for search of the Land Register and related records by the public and government departments. It has responsibility for the registration of owners corporations under the Building Management Ordinance.

==== India ====
Land registration is a matter for individual states in India. Thus each state will define the officials, authorities, and their functions and duties with respect to the ownership of land within that state. Each and every state has different recording and management systems. In recent times, Union Government of India and many state governments have started different programs to modernise the state level land records.

==== New Zealand ====
New Zealand uses the Torrens title system, which it adopted in 1870, replacing the deeds registration system. Land registration is governed by the Land Transfer Act 1952.

The Deeds system was introduced in 1841 and the Torrens system in 1870. Both methods ran in parallel until 1924 when registration under the Land Transfer Act (Torrens system) became compulsory and a project to issue titles for all property was instituted. A title could be issued Limited as to Title or Limited as to Parcel if there were doubts about the ownership or the survey.

==== Philippines ====
- Land Registration Authority (Filipino: Pangasiwaan sa Patalaan ng Lupain)

== See also ==
- Cadastre
- Deed
- European Land Registry Association
- Hukou (Mainland China)
- Land terrier
- Land titling
- Native title
- Property law
- Recorder of deeds
- Sasine
- Web mapping
