= Squatting in Australia =

Occupation of land or buildings in Australia without permission of owner

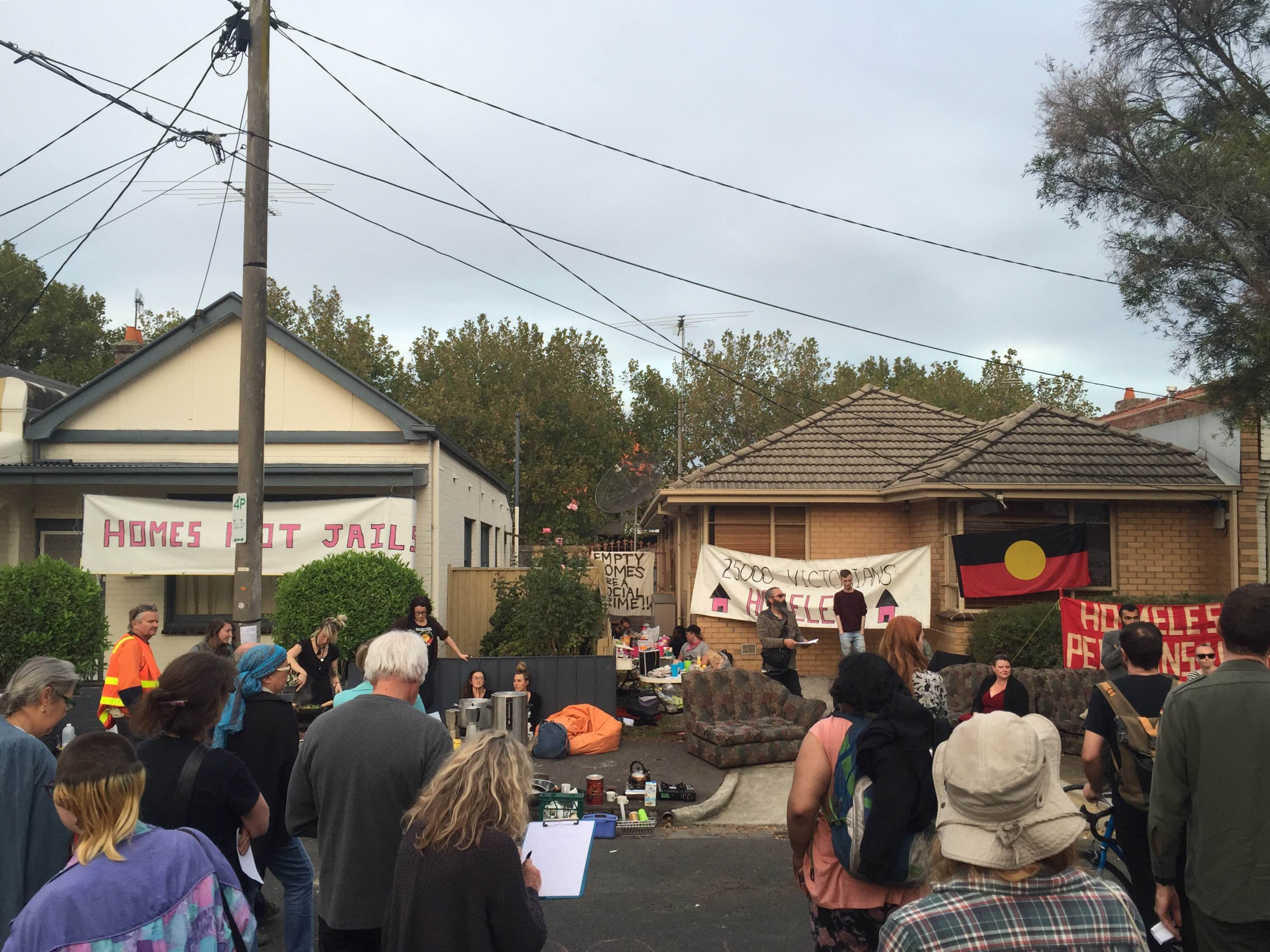
Houses 2 and 4, during the 2016 Bendigo Street housing dispute

Squatting in Australia usually refers to a person who is not the owner, taking possession of land or an empty house. In 19th century Australian history, a squatter was a settler who occupied a large tract of Aboriginal land in order to graze livestock. At first this was done illegally, later under licence from the Crown.

In more recent times, there have been squats in the major cities such as Canberra, Melbourne and Sydney. It would be possible in theory for squatters to be charged with criminal trespass under the Inclosed Lands Protection Act, but squatters are simply evicted when they are discovered. As in England and Wales and also the United States, adverse possession exists in Australian law, although it is rarely used by squatters. This means that if a squatter lives uninterruptedly in a property for over 12 years (15 in South Australia and Victoria) and against the wishes of the owner, the ownership of the property can be claimed by the squatter.

== Squattocracy ==
In the 19th century, the British government claimed to own all of Australia and tried to control land ownership, ignoring Aboriginal and Torres Strait Islander peoples. Farmers of livestock (some of them ex-convicts) claimed land for themselves and thus were known as squatters – the phenomenon is referred to in the song Waltzing Matilda. Maps of pastoral lands were also known as squatting maps. The successful farmers became wealthy and powerful, setting up empires which extend into the present in some cases.

== Squatting runs ==
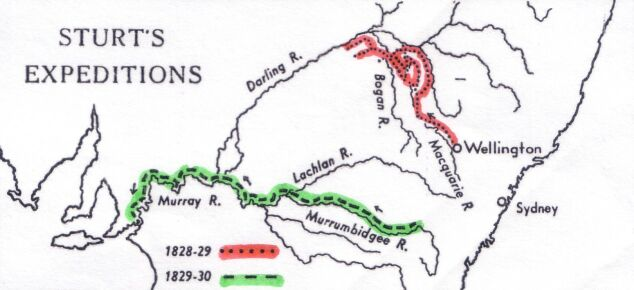
Early expeditions of Sturt

The Atlas Maps of N. South Wales, Queensland, New Zealand, Victoria and South Australia by William Owen was published in Melbourne in 1869. It provides the earliest preserved record of squatting runs in the colonies of eastern Australia and New Zealand. These maps also provide placenames for small 19th century settlements that had vanished. The New South Wales map includes the Riverine District with Squatting Runs. The colonial administration rejected squatting in 1833 but only with regards to trespass on Crown land. The Imperial Waste Lands Act 1846, known as Earl Grey's Act, established additional countries that had the status of intermediate districts and 15 squatting districts in which squatting runs could be taken up. The Waste Lands Repeal Act 1855 transferred the administration of land policy from the British Government to the colonies. In the 1840s squatters traveled along the Murrumbidgee route, which had been documented by the explorers Thomas Mitchell and Charles Sturt, in search for suitable lands.

== 1946 ==
Following World War II, various individuals and families squatted for housing in Hobart, Melbourne, Port Kembla and Sydney in 1946. The actions were supported by the Communist Party of Australia (CPA) and often resulted in more long term arrangements.

== Canberra ==
The Aboriginal Tent Embassy was set up in 1972 on the lawn in front of Parliament House (now Old Parliament House) in Canberra as a protest over Aboriginal land rights. It became a squat later that year in the eyes of the law when the Australian government criminalised the occupation by amending the Trespass on Commonwealth Lands Ordinance. It was then evicted and briefly resquatted several times, before being set up again in 1973. The embassy played a part in the formation of the Aboriginal Land Rights Act of 1976. The embassy then moved to different sites but returned to its original site in 1992. It remains as an ongoing protest occupation.

The Australian Capital Territory (ACT) Squatters' Union was formed in the early 1980s. It had links to the Franklin Dam campaign and was supported by the Builders Labourers Federation (BLF). The South Vietnamese embassy at 39 National Circuit and 14 Hobart Avenue had been empty since 1975 and was occupied after a demonstration in March 1984. The empty Cambodian embassy building on Melbourne Avenue was occupied in 1985 and quickly housed 200 people. The squatters said that they would be careful with their electricity use since at the South Vietnamese embassy they had left behind an unpaid bill of over $1000.

== Melbourne ==
The Squatters Union of Victoria was founded in 1981 and over the next three years coordinated over 170 squats.

Melbourne squats are usually located in the inner suburbs, like Footscray, St. Kilda and Coburg. They tend to be houses that are waiting for demolition. A well-known squat in Carlton was organised by international students in 2008. A Squatter's Handbook was produced by activists in 1993, 2001 and 2010.

The Bendigo Street housing dispute occurred in 2016. When the Government of Victoria wanted to build the East West Link road, squatters occupied a series of buildings in protest. Eventually, the road-building plans were scrapped and the government announced plans for a new package of measures to deal with homelessness.

== Sydney ==
In Sydney, streets of terraced houses in areas such as the Rocks and Potts Point were squatted to prevent their demolition in the 1970s. In the inner city suburb of Pyrmont, the Old Pyrmont Cottages were squatted from the late 1970s until 1994.

Much of the Glebe estate in Glebe was scheduled for demolition as part of road-building plans in the 1970s. A Green Ban was imposed in 1972 and the first house was squatted in 1973. Glebe Point Road had an extensive influx of squatters in the 1980s before its eventual gentrification. The squatters stayed until 1987, when the Department of Main Roads (DMR) shelved the road plans. Karl Kruszelnicki squatted in Glebe. Women's Liberation Movement activists including Anne Summers and Bessie Guthrie occupied a house to use as a women's refuge on Westmoreland Street in 1974. They called it the Elsie Refuge. It was legalised and eventually received funding. A women's refuge was also squatted by the Women's Liberation Movement in Adelaide in 1974.

Also during the 1970s and 1980s, extensive parts of Woolloomooloo and Darlinghurst were also squatted, along corridors of houses bought to make way for new road works. Examples of these include "The Compound" in Darlinghurst and along Palmer Street in Woolloomooloo. Punks, political activists, musicians and artists also started squatting in "The Gunnery", a former Navy warehouse and training facility, in Woolloomooloo, during the early-to-mid-1980s. This squat, a large warehouse with several unusual spaces able to be used as theatres or other venues (thanks to its former use by the Navy) became a critical site for the development of arts and music in Sydney in the mid to late 1980s, with independent musical and art events being held there regularly. It is now an arts centre.

The activists squatting empty buildings on Broadway which were owned by South Sydney City Council were evicted in 2001, a few months after the 2000 Olympics. They had organised art exhibitions, parties, political film nights and a free café.

The Midnight Star on Parramatta Road was built in the 1920s and opened as the Homebush Theatre cinema in 1925, operating until 1959. After being used amongst other things as an ice rink and a restaurant, it became derelict in the 1990s. When squatted in 2002, it was used as an autonomous social centre, hosting music events, a cafe, a library, a free internet space and a Food Not Bombs kitchen. It was evicted in December 2002 following its use as a convergence centre for protests against the November World Trade Organization talks.

In 2003, a legal squat was organised for ten people who moved onto the site of an old incinerator at Green Square.

A five-year-old squat was peacefully evicted in March 2008, when an office block in Balmain was demolished to make way for a park. The council voted to allow the squatters to stay in the building, which they called Iceland, until the plans for demolition were in place. One of the squatters said, "About 20 people have lived here over the years and it's been a place for band rehearsals, art projects, people practising dance routines, bike workshops. Squatting gives you a chance to think about things other than how you are going to pay the rent and ways to contribute to the world."

The "People's Castle" in Redfern had a free shop and a free café before being evicted in 2010. The Redfern Aboriginal Tent Embassy was established on National Sorry Day on 26 May 2014, by Aboriginal elders protesting against the gentrification of the area. The protesters demanded affordable housing and in 2017 agreed to leave when a deal was made to build 62 homes for Aboriginal people for the sum of $70 million.

There were estimated to be more than 120,000 unoccupied houses in Sydney in 2011.

== See also ==
- Adverse possession in Australia
