= Usucapio =

Concept in Roman law

Usucapio was a concept in Roman law that dealt with the acquisition of ownership of something through possession. It was subsequently developed as a principle of civil law systems, usucaption. It is similar to the common law concept of adverse possession, or acquiring land prescriptively.

== Overview ==
Since mancipatio and in iure cessio were inherently public modes of acquisition of ownership, usucapio was the only private method of the ius civile. Ownership of a thing in Roman law was usually protected forever, until a limit of thirty years was introduced in 426 AD on actions by Theodosius – in other words, preventing the owner of a thing getting it back or seeking damages after thirty years.

Usacapio was a form of acquisitive prescription – the passage of time entitled the holder to particular rights of acquisition. This right is a new right, one without reference to any existing rights.

Usucapio assisted two cases: where a thing had been transferred improperly (for example, transferring a res mancipi by traditio), or where the transferor of a thing did not hold proper title (for example, sale by a non-owner).

== Requirements ==
There were five requirements for the acquisition of ownership by usucapio. Firstly, the claimant must have had uninterrupted possession for the required period of time. The claimant must have gained the thing with iusta causa and in good faith (bona fides). The thing claimed must be capable of ownership, and must have at no time been stolen or taken by force.

=== Possession ===
The required period of time was only one year for movables and two years for land. Res universitas, groups of things such as an inheritance which may include both movables and land, also came under the one year rule. This is widely attributed to the time of the Twelve Tables, including by Cicero. The requirement of extended possession is believed to have been originally the only requirement, although certain types of things were exempt. These included stolen things, the res mancipi under another's guardianship, and limes – five-foot strips required between adjoining land holdings. The time period would have formed the prohibitive part in early Rome, where the community was sufficiently small that the owner could easily identify and regain his goods – considering also that if they had been stolen, they could not be usucapted. Usucapio would therefore have been restricted in most cases to informal conveyance of res mancipi. As Rome grew, however, it became more and more likely that the owner would be away for a year or more. The Praetor extended the rules of possession to new cases, which came to form a central part of usucapio: for example, the case of the inheritor believing that formerly borrowed goods are part of his inheritance.

=== Iusta causa and good faith ===
Iusta causa (alternatively "iustus titulus") is a requirement, in essence, that the transfer would have been valid if not for one of the two cases mentioned above. This will be a recognised method of transfer – for example, gift or sale. This has to be in fact; it cannot rest on a mistaken belief in there being a sale or gift, which is the main difference between iusta causa and good faith in practice. Good faith is not easily defined, despite being a common concept in the Roman law. In the case of sale by a non-owner (or another defect in title), then it probably meant that the claimant believed he was becoming owner. However, the receiver of a res mancipi by traditio must surely realise the problem, but this does not prevent usucapio. The burden of proof was on anyone disputing the usucapio to show bad faith. The bad faith had to be shown at the point of the iusta causa – it was insufficient to show that the claimant later realised that the item had come from a non-owner.

=== Stolen or taken by force ===
The claimed must be a res habilis, an object capable of private ownership and not otherwise prohibited.

Something that had at any point been stolen (furtum) or taken by force could not be usucapted. Furtum was much wider than theft in the modern criminal law (furtum was a civil action), involving most sorts of bad faith interference in another's property. This had the practical effect of extending the good faith requirement to the transferor as well as the transferee – for someone who sold, gifted or otherwise transferred the property of another in bad faith committed furtum. Indeed, that the transferor is a non-owner in fact means normally that at some point there has been furtum. Gaius, in book two of The Institutes gives two counter-examples: firstly, where a borrower has died, and his heir believes the thing to be part of his inheritance and sells it; secondly, where a man with a usufruct over a slave woman, ignorant of the law, wrongly believes the child to be his and sells it. Land could not be stolen, but it could certainly be taken by force. In either case (theft or force) it is only if the owner from whom it has been stolen regains it, or considers it lost forever (i.e. abandons it), that a valid usucapio can take place. Given this strict limitation, usucapio must surely only have been about shifting the burden of proof to the claimant from the possessor, whose possession was usually easy to show. However, it remains a departure from usual Roman ideas of ownership.

== Bonitary ownership and good faith possession ==
The two cases where usucapio could be said to create two classes of people – the "bonitary owner" where formalities have not been complied with, and the "good faith possessor" where, for example, the seller is not the owner. Under statute, neither class of persons had any more protection than a mere possessor. As such, their claim lay solely against their immediate dis-possessor, and were without an action against any further dis-possessors. The Praetor granted them further protection, probably in the late Republic. The bonitary owner was protected against anyone, the good faith possessor was protected with regards to everyone except the owner.

To deny the owner the right of vindicatio against the good faith possessor would run contrary to the concept of the usucapio, with it effectively completed before the required time had passed. In the case of the bonitary owner, the Praetor provided a defence to the vindicatio if there had been a transfer (improper or not). It was typical of the Praetor to ignore technical formalities to achieve practical benefits, in this case certainty of ownership.

If either the bonitary owner or good faith possessor was dis-possessed, he could under the normal law claim a possessory interdict against his dis-possessor, but this did not cover further people if possession had been further transferred. If that immediate dis-possessor was the owner, then the case would be the same as for vindicatio: the bonitary owner would have a claim, but the good faith possessor would not. If the immediate dis-possessor was not the owner, then both the bonitary owner and the good faith possessor would have a claim. This claim was the actio Publiciana.

By giving the bonitary owner the protection of an owner, the Praetor had very much weakened the res mancipi distinction and come close to abolishing the need for mancipatio. The Romans did not speak of the bonitary owner as dominus (as a normal owner would be), but rather to say that he had the thing in bonis from which the term "bonitary" is derived. The Romans considered ownership unique and indivisible: accordingly, one either had the rights of ownership or one did not. The Praetor's distinction made this unclear. Ultimately, Justinian abolished res mancipi, so the bonitary owner became owner and this theoretical problem was solved. However, the position as to the good faith possessor relied on a concept of relative title, part of the common law, but something which was alien to Roman ideas of ownership. The Romans merely considered it possession, thus bypassing the theoretical problem.

== See also ==
- Chazakah
