= Abutment (disambiguation) =

Abutment is a construction substructure.

It may also refer to:

- Spectral sequence abutment, a mathematical concept
- Abutment (dentistry), a dental structure

== See also ==
- Abutter, in property law
