= Registered owner =

Legal owner

A registered owner is usually the person or entity that is on the government records as being the legal owner of certain property, such as real estate or a motor vehicle, as well as ships. The registration of shares in a company is usually required to be managed by the company. The registered owner of a property in question is normally presumed, sometimes conclusively, to be the legal owner of the property and is said to “hold the title” or is “registered on the title”.

Ownership of property usually implies a right of possession, as opposed to the party that has right of property. The party that has the right of property is referred to as a lienholder, and in the event the registered owner fails to pay off the lien according to the agreed-to terms, the lienholder has the right to invoke repossession of the property.

In jurisdictions that have adopted the Torrens system of land registration and title, the register of land holdings provides conclusive evidence (termed "indefeasibility") of title of the person recorded on the register as the proprietor (owner), and of all other interests recorded on the register.

== Ownership in equity ==
Though the registration of ownership of certain property usually confers a statutory recognised legal title to the property, courts may nevertheless recognise equitable rights and interests of others in relation to that property. For example, a person who buys and pays for a parcel of land would be the equitable owner of the land though the transfer may not yet have been registered, and the registered owner would continue to be the registered owner until the registration of transfer but hold it subject to the interests of the purchaser, such as the right of possession or in relation to receipt of rent from a tenant should the property be rented.

== See also ==
- Beneficial ownership
