= Crowd Sourcing International =

- Formerly: Narc Technologies Inc.
- Industry: Data collection
- Headquarters: Dallas, Texas

Crowd Sourcing International (CSI), formerly known as Narc Technologies Inc., is a company based in Dallas, Texas, that operates a service known as Narc That Car from the website Narcthatcar.com. CSI members are paid small fees to enter license plate number and location information into the company's database, which is then provided to lien holders for auto repossession and law enforcement officials for stolen vehicles and Amber alerts.

CSI members can join after paying an up-front fee and a monthly website fee; members are paid for entering a monthly quota of license plate data, however they can earn additional money by increasing their amount of license plate data entered. This is done by recruiting new members in a business practice similar to multi-level marketing. CSI has received severe criticism for utilizing multi-level marketing strategies.

== Ratings and reviews ==
The Better Business Bureau of Dallas and Northeast Texas gave the company a "BBB Rating of F on a scale from A+ to F", citing several consumer complaints and concerns over whether the company sells "a bona fide product with a true market value." The Better Business Bureau concerns also include determining whether the business model is multi-level marketing, which is in compliance with the law, or a pyramid scheme, which is illegal. The Better Business Bureau claims it has been unable to verify the 3rd party clients whom CSI claims are purchasing the information product supplied by CSI members.
