= Mancipium =

Mancipium may refer to:

- Mancipium, a taxonomic synonym of Pieris (butterfly)
- Mancipatio, a Roman institution
