= Civil Enforcement Act (Alberta) =

1996 law in Alberta, Canada

The Civil Enforcement Act, S.A. 1994, c.C-10.5, is a law in Alberta, Canada. The law gave responsibility for seizures, evictions, repossessions, and enforcing court orders to authorized civil enforcement agencies. Sheriffs' Offices throughout the province closed, but the Office of the Sheriff - Civil Enforcement was created under the Court Services Division of Alberta Justice to monitor the civil enforcement agency activities and respond to complaints. The Act was proclaimed in force on January 1, 1996.
