= Right of possession =

Right of a person to possession of property

The right of possession is a right of a person who currently holds property in hand or under their control to retain such possession, or alternatively for another person who claims superior title or right to possession of the property. The possession must be "with voluntary consent of an individual or group that had authority of alienation."

There is a legal dictum in law that “possession is nine-tenths of the law”, meaning that a person in possession is presumed to have a right to such possession unless another person claiming possession proves they have a superior right to it.

== Examples ==
Several examples have been given of the right of possession:

- A business buys a vehicle and obtains financing. The entity purchasing the vehicle becomes the registered owner and has both possession and right of possession. The finance provider would be the lienholder and have a security interest that, upon default, would become a right of retention. If the business that bought the vehicle then rented it to someone, that individual would then have possession but would not have right of possession. The company renting the vehicle to them could repossess the vehicle, for example, if they hold the vehicle past the contract period. Also, if the rental company missed payments to the lienholder, the lienholder could also repossess the vehicle from the person having possession.
- I purchase a pen at a store. I have all three attributes (possession, right of possession and right of property). If I loan the pen to someone, they have only possession. If they fail to give it back, they conceivably could have all three, if I was unable to find them, since it is unlikely it would be possible for me to prove that an inexpensive item such as a pen was borrowed and not returned.
- An owner of a residential rental property wants a property management company to manage the property and to handle the necessary legal matters in the event an eviction (unlawful detainer) is necessary. So that the owner does not have to be personally named as the plaintiff in the unlawful detainer lawsuit, the property management contract includes an assignment of the right of possession so that the property management company may be the named plaintiff in the unlawful detainer action.
