= J A Pye (Oxford) Ltd v Graham =

UK legal case

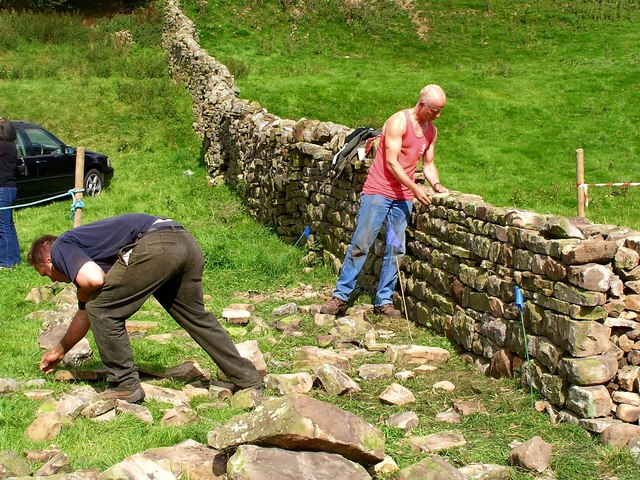
- Court: Judicial Committee of the House of Lords
- Full case name: J A PYE (OXFORD) LTD AND OTHERS (respondents) v GRAHAM AND ANOTHER (appellants)
- Decided: 4 July 2002
- Citation: UKHL 30 2002 UKHL 30

Case history
- Prior actions: Appellant lost in the Court of Appeal [2001] Ch 804 (before Mummery, Keene LJJ and Sir Martin Nourse) having won at first instance before Neuberger J [2000] Ch 676.

Court membership
- Judges sitting: Lord Bingham; Lord Mackay; Lord Browne-Wilkinson; Lord Hope; Lord Hutton

Case opinions
- Confirmed: until the coming into effect of the Land Registration Act 2002, twelve years of adverse possession of any non-negligible parcel of registered land, of itself, without force or secrecy, with intention to possess, without any entry on the land's title registers, is sufficient to transfer equitable ownership of it where continuously used or occupied. The land in the case was at the end of the twelve years held thereafter on trust for the squattor under the Land Registration Act 1925, s75(1). The defendant at the time of this action was entitled to remain and to become the registered new owner of the land; he did not occupy under the old grazing agreement which had expressly come to an end.

Keywords
- Adverse possession; section 75(1) of the Land Registration Act 1925 (repealed 13 October 2003)

J A Pye (Oxford) Ltd and Others v Graham and another [2002] is an English land law judgment from the final court of appeal at the time, the House of Lords, on adverse possession.

== Facts ==
The company claimant acted at all times through its director, Mr Pye. Pye allowed his neighbours the Grahams to use 23 hectares (57 acres) he owned, valued at £10,000,000, under a grazing agreement. The document expressly stated that the agreement would end on the 31 December 1983 and that to continue the arrangement a new contract would need to be entered into. Pye did not enter into another agreement because he wanted to develop the land but the Grahams continued to occupy the land. After 12 years the Grahams sought to obtain it under the law of adverse possession.

== Judgment ==
=== High Court ===
In the High Court Neuberger J ruled that under the Land Registration Act 1925 the Grahams were the lawful owners of the land as Pye had failed to take possession of this land. The case admitted in its final, unanimous, judgment that most similar instances of adverse possession in registered land will be averted on the commencement of the Land Registration Act 2002 (which took place on 13 October 2003).

=== Court of Appeal ===
The Court of Appeal overturned the ruling of the High Court and held that the Grahams were only using the land because of the grazing agreement, thus they hadn't been in possession of it.

=== House of Lords ===
The House of Lords unanimously rejected the Court of Appeal's decision and restored the decision of Neuberger J.

This was one of the last cases to be decided before the Land Registration Act 2002 came into force in 2003, which required that any land acquired through adverse possession had to be registered using the Land Registry. As such a registration would result in the original owner being informed this would allow them to object to such possession. The effect is to make it more difficult and unlikely to acquire registered land through squatting, because the owner might attempt repossession within two years after being informed by the Land Registry.

=== European Court of Human Rights ===
The case's application of the common law applying the LRA 1925 as it stood (before repealed with effect from 13 October 2003 by the LRA 2002) was litigated as J. A. Pye (Oxford) Ltd and Another v United Kingdom in the European Court of Human Rights. The ECtHR originally ruled that obtaining property via adverse possession was contrary to Article 1 of Protocol 1 of the European Convention on Human Rights (the right to the peaceful enjoyment of one's possessions). On appeal, the Grand Chamber subsequently held that although there was an interference with Convention rights, it was a proportionate and thus permissible interference; see J. A. Pye (Oxford) Ltd and Another v United Kingdom (2007) 46 EHRR 1083. English law on adverse possession was therefore human-rights compliant.
