= Disseisor =

A disseisor is an "adverse possessor" i.e. the person who has taken adverse possession of real property from the legal owner; ie., who has taken actual possession or occupation of the property without the permission of the legal owner.

== Perspective in property law ==
In property law, the disseisor deprives the legal owner of possession or seisin of an estate in land, thus "dis-seizing" (dispossessing) the legal owner.

A disseisee, the correlative, is the legal owner who has been put out of an estate unlawfully.

== See also ==
- Squatting
- Property law
