= Constructive possession =

Legal fiction of property law

Constructive possession is a legal fiction to describe a situation in which an individual has actual control over chattels or real property without actually having physical control of the same assets. At law, a person with constructive possession stands in the same legal position as someone with actual possession.

For example, if A's car is in his driveway, A has physical possession. However, if B has (honestly or otherwise) acquired a key to the car, she has constructive possession of the car because B can convert it from A's use to her own without A's consent.

Constructive possession is an important concept in both criminal law, regarding theft and embezzlement, and civil law, regarding possession of land and chattels. For example, if someone steals your credit card number, the credit card never leaves your actual possession, but the person who has stolen the number has constructive possession and could most likely be charged with theft of your credit card information.

Constructive possession is also essential in the seizure of goods by private or government authorities. Take, for example, a large piece of equipment such as an aircraft. Should a loan be issued with the aircraft as collateral, and the loan goes into default, the creditor may find it difficult to take possession of it. However, by notice to the borrower, the creditor may take constructive possession, which effectively prevents the borrower from using the aircraft without the creditor's permission, pending its removal. Similarly, when a landlord exercises a contractual remedy of distraint of goods for unpaid rent, the landlord need not remove the goods from the premises but may take constructive possession of the goods through a simple declaration.

However, a person who makes it impossible to take possession of another's property has taken actual possession, not constructive possession. For example, if someone chains someone else's car to an immovable object, they have taken possession of it even though they have not moved it.

Constructive possession can also refer to items inside of a vehicle. The owner and driver of the vehicle can be in constructive possession of anything inside their car. If a minor were driving their vehicle with passengers possessing alcohol or any illegal substance, the driver may be cited for constructive possession.

A person can be charged with constructive possession of an illegal device if they possess the otherwise legal material to assemble it. If a person has in his possession or control the ingredients to make an explosive device, he can be charged with constructive possession of that device.

In regards to determining if a firearm is loaded, some states with strict gun control laws apply the concept of constructive possession in establishing that one has a loaded firearm if the individual has both the firearm and its ammunition in their possession or readily accessible, regardless of whether or not a live round is in the firing chamber or a magazine with live ammunition has been inserted into the firearm. In this context, the firearm would be considered "legally loaded" by law, even though it may not be physically loaded.
