= Adverse possession in Australia =

The doctrine of adverse possession in Australia was inherited from England. Adverse possession arose in and was suited to a land law system based on possession and relativity of title. Various approaches were undertaken in this area in Australia.

The limitation period for the land varies among the states.

== The requirements to prove ==
The claimant will need to be able to prove to the Titles Office in the State of jurisdiction that they have occupied the land for the entire statutory time period. If there is any permission form, possession cannot be claimed.

Any person who is ready to take possession of an unoccupied property/land subject to satisfy all the demands of the Laws of the State of jurisdiction may claim unfavourable possession.

In case when adverse possession has not been fully developed, is not organized and lacks order, this called "incomplete adverse possession".

=== The statutory period ===
The limitation period for the land varies among the states:

State/Territory	Required length of time for the land	Limitation periods for the Crown
NSW	12 years	30 years
Queensland	12 years	—
Tasmania	12 years	30 years
Victoria	15 years	—
Western Australia	12 years	—
South Australia	15 years	60 years
ACT	—	—
Northern Territory	—	—

In laws of the Northern Territory, Queensland, Victoria, the ACT and Western Australia there's no way to bring an adverse possession claim against the Crown. It was proposed that the reason is that the Crown cannot be expected to monitor all Crown land for illegal occupiers.

The 60 year limitation period for the Crown has been kept by South Australia and has been reduced to 30 years in NSW and Tasmania, similarly to the English approach.

The NT and the ACT have statutes of limitations, but adverse possession is not part of their land law. The doctrine has been removed from the law of these territories.

== The law and squatting ==
Squatters are not tenants, they occupy premises without the consent of the owner. It is for this reason property owners want them occupied by legal tenants as a property that has been vacant for some time has the potential to be claimed by a squatter.

== Reviews ==
The doctrine of adverse possession was reviewed in publications such as "A Critique of the Doctrine of Adverse Possession", "The effect of adverse possession on part of a registered title land parcel" and "Adverse possession of Torrens land: Parliamentary inquiry strays out of bounds". The first article states that the "application of adverse possession in Australia is not morally justifiable." The second represents "an investigation of the effect of adverse possession upon the land market." The authors of the third article think that "the 1979 NSW reforms, being based on adverse possession, were unnecessarily clumsy." Also there is a dissertation titled "A review of the application of adverse possession within the Torrens system of land regulation in Australia".

In the opinion of Fiona Burns, "the Australian approach to adverse possession is fractured, incomplete and contradictory."

== Sources ==
- Hepburn, Samantha (2013). "Chapter 4: Adverse Possession". Australian Principles of Property Law. Routledge. pp. 67–85. ISBN 978-1-876905-08-8.
- Burns, Fiona (2011). "Adverse possession and title-by-registration systems in Australia and England". Melbourne University Law Review: 773, 786–788, 803. S2CID 55040649.
- Mulliss, Michael (2009). "A review of the application of adverse possession within the Torrens system of land regulation in Australia". pp. 18–19.
