= Statute of limitations =

Time limit for starting legal proceedings

A statute of limitations, known in civil law systems as a prescriptive period, is a law passed by a legislative body to set the maximum time after an event within which legal proceedings may be initiated. In most jurisdictions, such periods exist for both criminal law and civil law such as contract law and property law though often under different names and with varying details.

When the time which is specified in a statute of limitations runs out, a claim may no longer be filed, or if filed, it may be subject to dismissal if the defense against that claim is raised that the claim is time-barred as having been filed after the statutory limitations period.

When a statute of limitations expires in a criminal case, the courts no longer have jurisdiction. In many jurisdictions with statutes of limitation there is no time limit for dealing with particularly serious crimes.

In civil law systems, such provisions are typically part of their civil and criminal codes. The cause of action dictates the statute of limitations, which can be reduced or extended in order to ensure a full and fair trial. The intention of those laws is to facilitate resolution within a "reasonable" period of time. What amount of time is considered "reasonable" varies from country to country. In some countries like the United States, it may vary from jurisdiction to jurisdiction and state (or province, etc.) to state. Internationally, the statute of limitations may vary from one civil or criminal action to another. Some countries do not have a statute of limitations.

Analysis of a statute of limitations also requires the examination of any associated statute of repose, tolling provisions, and exclusions.

== Purpose ==
The purpose and effect of statutes of limitations are to protect defendants. There are three reasons for their enactment:

- A plaintiff with a valid cause of action can pursue it with reasonable diligence.
- By the time a stale claim is litigated, a defendant might have lost evidence necessary to disprove the claim.
- Litigation of a long-dormant claim may result in more cruelty than justice.

In Classical Athens, a five-year statute of limitations was established for almost all cases, exceptions being such as the prosecution of non-constitutional laws (which had no limitation). Demosthenes wrote that these statutes of limitations were adopted to control "sycophants" (professional accusers).

The limitation period generally begins when the plaintiff's cause of action accrues, meaning the date upon which the plaintiff is first able to maintain the cause of action in court, or when the plaintiff first becomes aware of a previous injury (for example, occupational lung diseases such as asbestosis).

Statute of limitations prioritize procedural justice over substantive merits and can result in errors of impunity.

== Applications ==
Common law legal systems can include a statute specifying the length of time within which a claimant or prosecutor must file a case. In some jurisdictions (e.g., California), a case cannot begin after the period specified, and courts have no jurisdiction over cases filed after the statute of limitations has expired. In some other jurisdictions (e.g., New South Wales, Australia), a claim can be filed that may prove to have been brought outside the limitations period, but the court will retain jurisdiction in order to determine that issue, and the onus is on the defendant to plead it as part of their defense, or the claim will not be statute-barred. Once they are filed, cases do not need to be resolved within the period specified in the statute of limitations.

== Statute of repose ==
A statute of repose limits the time within which an action may be brought based upon when a particular event occurred (such as the completion of construction of a building or the date of purchase of manufactured goods), and does not permit extensions. A statute of limitations is similar to a statute of repose but may be extended for a variety of reasons (such as the minority of the victim).

For example, most U.S. jurisdictions have passed statutes of repose for construction defects. If a person receives an electric shock due to a wiring defect that resulted from the builder's negligence during construction of a building, the builder is potentially liable for damages if the suit is brought within the time period defined by the statute, normally starting with the date that construction is substantially completed. After the statutory time period has passed, without regard to the nature or degree of the builder's negligence or misconduct, the statute of repose presents an absolute defense to the claim.

Statutes of repose are sometimes controversial; manufacturers contend that they are necessary to avoid unfair litigation and encourage consumers to maintain their property. Alternatively, consumer advocates argue that they reduce incentives to manufacture durable products and disproportionately affect the poor, because manufacturers will have less incentive to ensure low-cost or "bargain" products are manufactured to exacting safety standards.

== Tolling and the discovery rule ==
Many jurisdictions toll or suspend the limitation period in exceptional circumstances such as if the aggrieved person (plaintiff, appellant or petitioner) was a minor, or has filed a bankruptcy proceeding. In those instances, the running of limitations is tolled or paused, until the condition ends. Equitable tolling may also be applied if an individual may intimidate a moving party into not reporting or has been promised a suspended period.

The statute of limitations may begin when the harmful event, such as fraud or injury, occurs or it may begin when the harmful event is discovered. The U.S. Supreme Court has described the "standard rule" of when the time begins as "when the plaintiff has a complete and present cause of action." The rule has existed since the 1830s. A "discovery rule" applies in other cases (including medical malpractice), or a similar effect may be applied by tolling.

According to U.S. district judge Sean J. McLaughlin, the discovery rule does not apply to mass media such as newspapers and the Internet; the statute of limitations begins to run at the date of publication. In 2013, the U.S. Supreme Court unanimously ruled in Gabelli v. SEC that the discovery rule does not apply to U.S. Securities and Exchange Commission's investment-advisor-fraud lawsuits since one of the purposes of the agency is to root out fraud.

In private civil matters, the limitation period may generally be shortened or lengthened by agreement of the parties. Under the Uniform Commercial Code, the parties to a contract for sale of goods may reduce the limitation period to one year but not extend it.

Limitation periods that are known as laches may apply in situations of equity; a judge will not issue an injunction if the requesting party waited too long to ask for it. Such periods are subject to broad judicial discretion.

For US military cases, the Uniform Code of Military Justice (UCMJ) states that all charges except those facing court-martial on a capital charge have a five-year statute of limitations. If the charges are dropped in all UCMJ proceedings except those headed for general court-martial, they may be reinstated, once only, for six months.

== Prescription ==
In civil law countries, almost all lawsuits must be brought within a legally-determined period at the end of which the right of action is extinguished. This is known as liberative or extinctive prescription. Under Italian and Romanian law, criminal trials must be ended within a time limit.

In criminal cases, the public prosecutor must lay charges within a time limit which varies by jurisdiction and varies based on the nature of the charge, whose directives vary from country to country. Over the last decade of the 20th century, many jurisdictions in the United States significantly lengthened the statute of limitations for sex offenses, particularly against children, as a response to research and popular belief that a variety of causes can delay the recognition and reporting of crimes of this nature.

Common triggers for suspending the prescription include a defendant's fugitive status or the commission of a new crime. In some jurisdictions, a criminal may be convicted in absentia. Prescription should not be confused with the need to prosecute within "a reasonable delay" as obligated by the European Court of Human Rights.

== Laws by region ==
=== International crimes ===
Under international law, genocide, crimes against humanity and war crimes are usually not subject to any statute of limitations as codified in a number of multilateral treaties. States ratifying the Convention on the Non-Applicability of Statutory Limitations to War Crimes and Crimes Against Humanity agree to disallow limitations claims for these crimes. According to Article 29 of the Rome Statute of the International Criminal Court, genocide, crimes against humanity, and war crimes "shall not be subject to any statute of limitations."

=== Australia ===
In Australia, there are no statutes of limitation in criminal proceedings if the maximum penalty that can be imposed for an offence committed by an individual includes imprisonment for more than 6 months. For civil matters, the statutes of limitation are prescribed by each state or territory jurisdiction.

==== Victoria ====
The Limitations Act 1958 allows 12 years for victims of child abuse to make a claim, with age 37 the latest at which a claim can be made. The police submitted evidence to a commission, the Victorian Inquiry into Church and Institutional Child Abuse (in existence since 2012) indicating that it takes an average of 24 years for a victim of child sexual abuse to go to the police. According to Attorney General Robert Clark, the government will remove statutes of limitations on criminal child abuse; victims of violent crime should be given additional time, as adults, to deal with the legal system. Offenders of minors and the disabled have used the statute of limitations to avoid detection and prosecution, moving from state to state and country to country; an example which was presented to the Victorian Inquiry was the Christian Brothers.

An argument for abolishing statutes of limitations for civil claims by minors and people under guardianship is ensuring that abuse of vulnerable people would be acknowledged by lawyers, police, organizations and governments, with enforceable penalties for organisations which have turned a blind eye in the past. Support groups such as SNAP Australia, Care Leavers Australia Network and Broken Rites have submitted evidence to the Victoria inquiry, and the Law Institute of Victoria has advocated changes to the statute of limitations.

==== Western Australia ====
The Criminal Procedure Act 2004 outlines the statute of limitations, stating that a simple offence (an offence which can only be brought to a magistrate's court, and cannot include more than 12 months' imprisonment as the maximum penalty) shall have a statute of limitations of 12 months. However, all crimes (offences which can be brought to a district court or the supreme court) have no statute of limitations. Furthermore, a person may be charged with a simple offence after 12 months' if the person consents to such a charge being laid, or if that offence has a different statute of limitations as provided by law.

=== Canada ===
==== Criminal ====
A criminal statute of limitations exists in Canada although for most crimes, it is rather weak. Offences under the Criminal Code fall into one of two base categories, summary and indictable, with indictable being the more serious of the two. Additionally, most offences are hybrid offenses, where they may be tried as either summary or indictable depending on the severity of the crime; this is done at the Crown's discretion.

Summary proceedings have a limitation period of 12 months unless waived (such as under a plea deal). Hybrid offences cannot be prosecuted as summary after the limitation period, but can still be upgraded to indictable.

Non-hybrid summary offences (e.g. causing a disturbance, nudity, trespassing at night, falsifying employment records) cannot be prosecuted at all after the limitation period. Few offences fall under this category.

Indictable offences (e.g. murder, kidnapping, sexual assault, perjury) do not have a limitation period; a defendant can be charged at any future date. In sexual assault cases in particular, men and women have been charged and convicted more than 40 years after the abuse had been committed.

Hybrid offences (e.g. theft, assault, harassment, mischief) can be charged as indictable if the Crown deems it to be in the public interest and serious enough to be worth their resources, making the limitation period of 12 months somewhat weak or even irrelevant in many instances. Someone who has committed a hybrid offence in the past can never be truly immune from prosecution simply because their crime is "out of statute", unlike in other jurisdictions. Some hybrid offences may have aggravating factors which automatically make them indictable offences (e.g. mischief causing actual danger to life, assault which causes the victim to be wounded, maimed or disfigured), removing the limitation period entirely.

==== Civil ====
Limitation periods for civil cases vary by province:

Civil limitation periods in Canada by province
Province	Length
Alberta	2 years
British Columbia	2 years
Manitoba	2 years
New Brunswick	2 to 10 years
Newfoundland and Labrador	2 to 10 years
Northwest Territories	2 to 10 years
Nova Scotia	2 years
Nunavut	1 to 10 years
Ontario	2 to 15 years
Prince Edward Island	1 to 10 years
Québec	3 years (6 months if against a municipality)
Saskatchewan	2 years
Yukon	1 to 10 years

Claims filed in Federal Court are generally subject to the limitation period of the province it arises from; in other cases the limitation period is 6 years.

For unsecured consumer debts such as credit cards and personal loans, the applicable provincial limitation period generally runs from the date of the debtor's last payment or written acknowledgment of the debt, after which the debt becomes "statute-barred" and unenforceable in court, although the underlying obligation is generally not extinguished.

=== China ===
According to Article 87 of the Criminal Law of the People's Republic of China, statute of limitations depends entirely on the maximum possible punishment for the offense as follows.

- 5 years for offenses which are punishable by a maximum of less than 5 years imprisonment.
- 10 years for offenses which are punishable by a maximum of more than 5 but less than 10 years imprisonment.
- 15 years for offenses which are punishable by a maximum of more than 10 years imprisonment but not life.
- 20 years for offenses which are punishable by a maximum of life imprisonment, or capital punishment. However, prosecution may still proceed if it is still deemed necessary and is approved by the Supreme People's Procuratorate.

Article 88 states there are two major exceptions where the statute of limitations are completely ignored. First, the period stops if a suspect goes into hiding or evades justice after the civilian police, prosecutors, State Security Police, or courts have already opened an official investigation or accepted the case. Second, the limits do not apply if a victim officially filed a complaint while the limit was still active, but the police, prosecutors, or courts failed to open the case when they were supposed to. Article 89 states that if the offender commits another crime during the period, the period is recalculated from the day when the new crime is committed.

=== Finland ===
In Finland, the authority of a prosecuting official to bring charges for a crime expires after a set period of time has passed since the act. This period is 20, 10, 5, or 2, years depending on the seriousness of the offence. Offences punishable with life imprisonment, such as murder and treason, do not expire. Sexual offences committed against minors do not expire before the victim reaches 23 or 28 years of age, depending on the nature of the offence.

=== Germany ===
In Germany, the statute of limitations on crimes varies by type of crime, with the highest statute of limitation being 30 years for voluntary manslaughter (Totschlag). Murder, genocide, crimes against humanity, war crimes and the crime of aggression have no statute of limitations.

In Germany, the crime of murder used to have a 20-year statute of limitations. In 1969, the statute of limitations for murder was extended from 20 to 30 years. The limitations were abolished altogether in 1979, in order to prevent Nazi criminals from avoiding criminal liability.

For most other criminal offences, the statute of limitations is set by Section 78(3) of the Criminal Code (Strafgesetzbuch) as follows:

- 30 years for offences which are punishable by a maximum term of imprisonment for life;
- 20 years for offences which are punishable by a maximum term of imprisonment of over 10 years but not by imprisonment for life;
- 10 years for offences which are punishable by a maximum term of imprisonment of over 5 years but no more than 10 years;
- 5 years for offences which are punishable by a maximum term of imprisonment of over 1 year but no more than 5 years;
- 3 years for all other offences.

In the civil code (Bürgerliches Gesetzbuch), the regular statute of limitations is three years (plus the time until the end of the calendar year); however, different terms between two and thirty years may apply in specific situations. For example, the term is only two years for claims for alleged defects of purchased goods, but 30 years for claims resulting from a court judgement (such as awarded damages).

=== India ===
The statute of limitations in India is defined by the Limitations Act, 1963.

The statute of limitations for criminal offences is governed by Sec. 514 of the Bharatiya Nagarik Suraksha Sanhita, 2023 (erstwhile sec. 468 of Code of Criminal Procedure, 1973).

=== Indonesia ===
The statutes of limitations in Indonesia are defined by articles 136-139 of Law No. 1 of 2023 on Criminal Code, and varies by type of crimes and ages of the perpetrators. According to article 136 of the Criminal Code, as well as article 7 and article 46 of Law No. 26 of 2000 on Human Rights Courts, the limits are as follows:

- For crimes committed by adults:
  - 3 years for crimes which are punishable by a maximum of 1 year imprisonment or by only a maximum criminal fine of category III (Rp50,000,000).
  - 6 years for crimes which are punishable by a maximum of 3 years imprisonment.
  - 12 years for crimes which are punishable by a maximum of 7 years imprisonment.
  - 18 years for crimes which are punishable by a maximum of 15 years imprisonment.
  - 20 years for crimes which are punishable by a maximum of 20 years imprisonment, life imprisonment, or capital punishment.
- For crimes committed by children:
  - 1 year for crimes which are punishable by a maximum of 1 year imprisonment or by only a maximum criminal fine of category III (Rp50,000,000).
  - 2 years for crimes which are punishable by a maximum of 3 years imprisonment.
  - 4 years for crimes which are punishable by a maximum of 7 years imprisonment.
  - 6 years for crimes which are punishable by a maximum of 15 years imprisonment.
  - around 6.6 years for crimes which are punishable by a maximum of 20 years imprisonment, life imprisonment, or capital punishment.
- No limit for genocide and crimes against humanity.

For most crimes, the prescriptive period begins from the following day after the crime is committed. However, exceptions are made for crimes of forgery, currency destruction, abduction, and hostage-taking. For the first two, the period is calculated from the following day after the forged goods or damaged currency is used, while for crimes of abduction and hostage-taking, it is calculated from the following day after the victim is released or dies as a direct result of the crime.

=== New Zealand ===
The statutes of limitations in New Zealand are defined by section 25 of the Criminal Procedure Act 2011. The limits are as follows:

- 6 months for offences which are punishable by a maximum of 3 months imprisonment or a $7,500 fine.
- 12 months for offences which are punishable by a maximum of 6 months imprisonment or a $20,000 fine.
- 5 years for offences which are punishable by a maximum of 3 years imprisonment, although this can be extended with the consent of the Solicitor-General.
- No limit for offences which are punishable by more than 3 years imprisonment.

=== Norway ===
The statute of limitations on murder was abolished by a change in law on 1 July 2014, causing any murders committed after 1 July 1989 to have no statute of limitations. This led to the national police force implementing a new investigation group for old cases called the "Cold Case" group. The law was also changed to let cases involving domestic violence, forced marriage, human trafficking and genital mutilation to count from the day the victim turns 18 years old. Cases where the statute of limitations have already passed can not be extended due to the constitution preventing it.

=== Philippines ===
In the Philippines, the Revised Penal Code has different limitation periods, based on the penalty of the crime:

- Reclusión perpetua or reclusión temporal (imprisonment of 12 years and 1 day to 40 years): 20 years
- Other afflictive penalties (imprisonment of 6 years and 1 day to 12 years): 15 years
- Correctional penalties: 10 years, except:
  - Arresto mayor (imprisonment of 1 month and 1 day to 6 months): 5 years
  - Libel and other similar offenses: 1 year
  - Oral defamation and slander: 6 months
- Light penalties (imprisonment of 1 day to 30 days): 2 months

Other special laws have their own limitation periods. For crimes punished under the Revised Penal Code, the limitation period won't run if the offender is outside the Philippines, while for those punished under other laws, it does. Municipal ordinances have a limitation period of 2 months.

=== South Korea ===
In July 2015, the National Assembly abolished a 25-year limit on first degree murder; it had previously been extended from 15 to 25 years in December 2007.

=== Turkey ===
Turkish Code of Obligations sets the general limitation period to ten years, which applies where the law does not provide a specific limitation period.

There is no statute of limitations for sexual offenses committed against minors, however, under both the Turkish Penal Code (article 99) and Turkish Civil Code (Law No. 2827).

=== United Kingdom ===
The United Kingdom has no statute of limitations for criminal offences beyond minor summary offences (offences tried exclusively in the magistrates' courts); the Magistrates' Courts Act 1980 requires that criminal proceedings for summary offences be brought within six months. To obtain a conviction in "some road traffic offences" (e.g. speeding), the Road Traffic Offenders Act 1988 requires that the driver must be notified within 14 days of the offence of the intention to prosecute.

For civil claims, the period of validity varies depending on the type of claim. For example, a claim (debt) from a simple contract can no longer be pursued after six years.

=== United States ===
In the United States, statutes of limitations may apply in criminal procedures and civil lawsuits. Statutes of limitations vary significantly among U.S. jurisdictions.

A government agency is permitted by the Congress to create under federal regulations its own statute of limitations.

==== Retroactive extensions ====
The U.S. Supreme Court held in 2003 in Stogner v. California by a 5–4 majority that California's retroactive extension of the criminal statute of limitations for sexual offenses committed against minors was an unconstitutional ex post facto law.

==== Civil statutes ====
A civil statute of limitations applies to a non-criminal legal action, including a tort or contract case. If the statute of limitations expires before a lawsuit is filed, the defendant may raise the statute of limitations as an affirmative defense to seek dismissal of the claim. The exact time period depends on both the state and the type of claim (contract claim, personal injury, fraud etc.). Most fall in the range of one to ten years, with two to three years being most common.

==== Criminal statutes ====
A criminal statute of limitations defines a time period during which charges must be initiated for a criminal offense. If a charge is filed after the statute of limitations expires, the defendant may obtain dismissal of the charge.

===== Initiation of charges =====
The statute of limitations in a criminal case only runs until a criminal charge is filed and a warrant issued, even if the defendant is a fugitive. When the identity of a defendant is not known, some jurisdictions provide mechanisms to initiate charges and thus stop the statute of limitations from running. For example, some states allow an indictment of a John Doe defendant based upon a DNA profile derived from evidence obtained through a criminal investigation. Although rare, a grand jury can issue an indictment in absentia for high-profile crimes to get around an upcoming statute of limitations deadline. One example is the skyjacking of Northwest Orient Airlines Flight 305 by D. B. Cooper in 1971. The identity of D. B. Cooper remains unknown, and he was indicted under the name "John Doe, aka Dan Cooper."

===== Heinous crimes =====
Crimes which are widely considered heinous have no statute of limitations. Although there is usually no statute of limitations for murder (particularly first-degree murder), judges have been known to dismiss murder charges in cold cases if they feel that the delay violates the defendant's right to a speedy trial. For example, waiting many years for an alibi witness to die before commencing a murder trial would be unconstitutional.

===== Military law =====
Under the U.S. Uniform Code of Military Justice (UCMJ), desertion has no statute of limitations.

Maritime Injury Law

Under 46 U.S. Code § 30106, "Except as otherwise provided by law, a civil action for damages for personal injury or death arising out of a maritime tort must be brought within 3 years after the cause of action arose." There are some exceptions to this, primarily with regard to Jones Act cases filed against the government, in which case the statute of limitations can be less than 2 years.

===== State laws =====
State	Misdemeanor	Felony	Notes
Connecticut	1 year	Terrorism not resulting in death: 30 years; Manslaughter: 25 years; Rape: 15 years; Violent felonies: 10 years; Nonviolent felonies: 5 years; Nonviolent felonies committed by a minor: 2 years	A bill was proposed to abolish the statute of limitations for most sex offenses, but it was not submitted for a vote in the state senate. Efforts continue to pass legislation to extend the limitations period for the prosecution of sex offenses.
Michigan	6 years	Murder: No limits; Kidnapping, extortion, assault with intent or conspiracy to murder: 10 years; Sexual conduct, violence or abuse: If DNA evidence is present but offender has not been identified: No limits; If DNA evidence is present and offender identified or when the victim turns 21, whichever is earlier: 10 years; Against a minor (below the age of 18): 10 years; Others: 6 years	Statute of limitation tolls if defendant is not a resident and did not usually and publicly reside in the state. See MCL 767.24
North Carolina	2 years	No limits	No statute of limitations for "malicious misdemeanors", per NCGS §15-1
Ohio	2 years	Murder: no limits; Rape, sexual battery, or conspiracy to commit the same: 25 years; Manslaughter, kidnapping, human trafficking, gross sexual imposition, prositution, aggravated arson, money laundering, terrorism, robbery/burglary, aggravated riot, felonious or aggravated assault of a peace officer, or conspiracy to commit the same: 20 years; All other felonies: 6 years	"Minor misdemeanors" are limited after six months.
Texas	2 years	Murder, manslaughter, certain sexual offenses, leaving the scene of a fatal accident, compelling prostitution of a minor or vulnerable person, or human trafficking: no limits; Thefts involving fiduciaries or public officials, forgery/use of forged instruments, injury to an elderly or disabled person, arson, or compelling prostitution: 10 years; Misapplication of fiduciary property, money laundering, certain tax crimes, fraud, identity theft, credit/debit card abuse, exploitation of a child or older adult, or bigamy: 7 years; Insurance fraud, abandoning or endangering a child, or other theft, burglary, or robbery offenses: 5 years; All other felonies: 3 years	Limitation periods toll while the accused is outside the state.
Utah		Sexual conduct, violence, or abuse against a minor (below the age of 18): 10 years after the victim becomes 18 years old; Murder, rape, manslaughter, aggravated kidnapping: No limits	

==== Exceptions ====
Pursuant to the legal doctrine of tolling, U.S. jurisdictions recognize exceptions to statutes of limitation that may allow for the prosecution of a crime or civil lawsuit even after the statute of limitations would otherwise have expired. Some states stop the clock for a suspect who is not residing within the state.

The right to speedy trial may potentially derail a felony prosecution after many years have passed, including in states that have no statute of limitations for the charged offense.

===== Fraud on the court =====
When an officer of the court is found to have fraudulently presented facts to impair the court's impartial performance of its legal task, the act (known as fraud on the court or fraud upon the court) is not subject to a statute of limitation: "This concept that [sic] the inherent power of federal courts to vacate a fraudulently obtained judgment—even years after the judgment was entered—has long been recognized by the Supreme Court." Fraud on the court can be done many ways and in any court. One of which can be "where the court or a member is corrupted or influenced or influence is attempted or where the judge has not performed his judicial function — thus where the impartial functions of the court have been directly corrupted." Officer of the court includes any judge, law clerk, court clerk, lawyer, investigator, probation officer, referee, legal guardian, parenting-time expeditor, mediator, evaluator, administrator, special appointee or anyone else whose influence is part of the judicial mechanism.

===== Continuing-violations doctrine =====
In tort law, if any person or entity commits a series of illegal acts against another person or entity (or in criminal law if a defendant commits a continuing crime) the limitation period may begin to run from the last act in the series. The entire chain of events can be tolled if the violations were continuing. Courts have explained that the continuing-violations doctrine "tolls the statute of limitations in situations where a continuing pattern forms due to discriminatory acts which have been occurring over a period of time, as long as at least one incident of discrimination occurred within the limitations period." Whether the continuing-violations doctrine applies to a particular violation is subject to judicial discretion; it was said to apply to copyright infringement in the jurisdiction of the Seventh Circuit, but not in the jurisdiction of the Second Circuit.

== See also ==
- Adverse possession
- Might makes right
- Miscarriage of justice
- Justice delayed is justice denied
- Nullum tempus occurrit regi
- Tort reform
