= Nullum tempus occurrit regi =

Legal doctrine precluding statute of limitations against the sovereign

Nullum tempus occurrit regi ("no time runs against the king"), also abbreviated to nullum tempus, is a common law doctrine.

In republics, it is often referred to as "nullum tempus occurrit reipublicae".

== Meaning ==
The doctrine states that the crown is not subject to statutes of limitations or to the doctrine of laches. This means that the crown can proceed with actions that would be barred if brought by an individual due to the passage of time. It also makes it impossible to obtain property rights over government-owned land by adverse possession, or "squatters' rights".

The doctrine is considered by some to be an application of sovereign immunity to areas of law concerning statutes of limitations. While the two doctrines are often linked as concepts, and are considered by some jurisdictions to be intertwined in policy and practice, there is a debate on whether the two doctrines are actually related.

== Purpose ==
Some legal experts assert that Nullum tempus is designed to protect public interests, on the belief that members of the public should not have to be liable for an official's failure to bring timely actions.

In the United States, the Supreme Court listed a separate purpose for nullum tempus, asserting, in a 1938 ruling, that since the King is always busily working for the public good, it does not have time to assert his rights, within the timeframe that is normally given to his subjects.

== Criticism ==
Some legal experts have called for the abolition of nullum tempus. They argue that sovereign immunity, which they assert is the legal underpinning of nullum tempus, can lead to unjust results, and that nullum tempus is difficult to justify because policies underlying sovereign immunity bear no logical relation to those that support statutes of limitation.

Some also argue that nullum tempus needs to be abolished, at least in matters relating to tax laws, in order to provide finality for matters, encourage timeliness of claims, harmonize tax laws with other administrative laws, promote administrative and judicial economy, and discourage arbitrary assessments.

== Use by regions ==
=== Canada ===
For civil cases in Canada, the statute of limitation for non-governmental entities vary by province, any can vary from 1 to 20 years, depending on the case.

The crown, however, enjoys a longer statute of limitation in some cases. In Nova Scotia, the Limitations of Actions Act in 1837 puts a 60-year statute of limitations on the crown to pursue any claims on lands or rent. The 60-year limitation was also mentioned in the Real Property Limitations Act.

The 60-year limitation is a legacy of legislation from the United Kingdom, as mentioned below.

=== United Kingdom ===
In the United Kingdom, application of nullum tempus was restricted, but not ended entirely, by the Nullum Tempus Acts of 1623 and 1769, which barred Crown claims that predated 60 years.

In a court ruling in Canada's Nova Scotia province that mentioned the history of nullum tempus in the United Kingdom, it was noted that the rationale for the acts was that the King at the time wished people can hold the lands which they and their ancestors had enjoyed.

=== United States ===
On the federal level, nullum tempus is a legacy of British law, dating back to the nation's time as a group of British colonies. It has been recognized by the Supreme Court as a valid legal doctrine since at least 1878.

Many states within the United States have court opinions or laws that mention or delineate the use of nullum tempus. The frequency of such court rulings or laws, as well as its applicability or limitations, vary by state.

Nullum tempus is no longer applicable in 13 states. Of those 13 states, Connecticut, Florida, Georgia, Minnesota, Missouri, Montana and North Dakota abolished the doctrine via legislation, while Arizona, Colorado, Nevada, New Jersey, New York and South Carolina abolished it via a court ruling

The applicability of nullum tempus in Tennessee is unclear, and Alaska's Supreme Court has never addressed, discussed or otherwise mentioned nullum tempus in its rulings.
