= Adverse possession =

Property law concept

Adverse possession in common law, and the related civil law concept of usucaption (also acquisitive prescription or prescriptive acquisition), are legal mechanisms under which a person who does not have legal title to a piece of property, usually real property, may acquire legal ownership based on continuous possession or occupation without the permission (license) of its legal owner. At common law, there was no requirement adverse possession claims be made in good faith, meaning that an adverse possessor was not required to prove that they subjectively believed they were entitled to the property. Some jurisdictions now impose by statute a requirement of good faith belief.

Adverse possession is sometimes colloquially described as squatter's rights, a term associated with occupation without legal title during the westward expansion in North America, as occupying real property without permission is central to adverse possession. Some jurisdictions regulate squatting separately from adverse possession.

== Description ==
In general, a property owner has the right to recover possession of their property from unauthorised possessors through legal action such as ejectment. However, many legal systems courts recognize that once someone has occupied property without permission for a significant period of time without the property owner exercising their right to recover their property, not only is the original owner prevented from exercising their right to eject, but a new title to the property "springs up" in the adverse possessor. In effect, the adverse possessor becomes the property's new owner. (Note: As described in the various "Requirements" sections, a number of conditions must be met in order for the adverse possessor to actually acquire title.) Over time, legislatures created statutes of limitations setting a time limit for how long owners have to recover possession of their property from adverse possessors. In the United States, for example, these limitation periods vary widely between individual states, ranging from five years to 40 years for real property, or three to five years for personal property.

Although the elements of an adverse possession action differ by jurisdiction, a person claiming adverse possession in a common law system is usually required to prove non-permissive use of the property that is actual, open and notorious, exclusive, adverse and continuous for the statutory period. (Note: "Adverse possession is a method of acquiring complete title to land as against all others, including the record owner, through certain acts over an uninterrupted period of time, as prescribed by statute". Gifis, Steven H. (1984) Barron's Law Dictionary, page 14; "An open, notorious, exclusive and adverse possession for twenty years operates to convey a complete title...not only an interest in the land...but complete dominion over it." Sir William Blackstone (1759), Commentaries on the Laws of England, Volume 2, page 418.) The possession by a person is not adverse during periods when they are in possession as a tenant or licensee of the legal owner.

Civil law jurisdictions may recognize a similar right of acquisitive prescription. For example, the French Code Civil 2258 et. seq. recognizes that title may be acquired through thirty years of "continuous and uninterrupted possession which is peaceful, public, unequivocal, and as owner." It is related to the Roman law concept of usucaption or usucapio.

In Denmark, the concept was first mentioned as "Hævd" in Jyske Lov in 1241, though only regulating between peasants and the church, with an asymmetric time limit of 30 years for the church, and 40 years for the peasant. In 1475, the 40 year limit was ruled to apply between farmers as well. In 1547 (after the Reformation) a rule was passed to change this to 20 years for everyone. The rule was later adopted into the Danish Code, published in 1683, this specific part still being in force today. The Norwegian Code from 1688 contains a similar provision.

Personal property, traditionally known as chattel, may also be adversely possessed, but owing to the differences in the nature of real and chattel property, the rules governing such claims are rather more stringent, and favour the legal owner rather than the adverse possessor. Claims for adverse possession of chattel often involve works of art.

== History ==
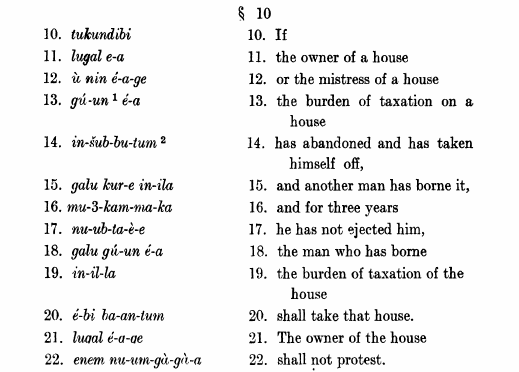
"The Sumerian law code compared with Hammurabi", S. Langdon, 1920

In Roman law, usucapio laws allowed someone who was in possession of a good without title to become the lawful proprietor if the original owner did not appear after some time (one or two years), unless the good was obtained illegally (by theft or force). Stemming from Roman law and its successor, the Napoleonic Code generally recognizes two time periods for the acquisition of property: 30 years and some lesser time period, depending on the bona fides of the possessor and the location of the parties involved.

Parliament passed England's first general statute limiting the right to recover possession of land in 1623, the Limitation Act 1623 (21 Jas. 1. c. 16). At common law, if entitlement to possession of land was in dispute (originally only in what were known as real actions), the person claiming a right to possession was not allowed to allege that the land had come into their possession in the past (in older terminology that he had been 'put into seisin') at a time before the reign of Henry I. The law recognised a cutoff date going back into the past, before which date the law would not be interested. There was no requirement for a defendant to show any form of adverse possession. As time went on, the date was moved by statute—first to the reign of Henry II, and then to the reign of Richard I. No further changes were made of this kind. By the reign of Henry VIII the fact that there had been no changes to the cutoff date had become very inconvenient. A new approach was taken whereby the person claiming possession had to show possession of the land for a continuous period, a certain number of years (60, 50 or 30 depending on the kind of claim made) before the date of the claim. Later statutes have shortened the limitation period in most common law jurisdictions.

At traditional English common law, it was not possible to obtain title to property of the Crown by means of adverse possession. This principle was embodied by the Latin maxim nullum tempus occurrit regi ('no time runs against the king'). In the United States, this privilege was carried over to the federal and state governments; government land is immune from loss by adverse possession. Land with registered title in some Torrens title systems is also immune, for example, land that has been registered in the Hawaii Land Court system.

In the common law system of England and its historical colonies, local legislatures—such as Parliament in England or American state legislatures—generally create statutes of limitations that bar the owners from recovering the property after a certain number of years have passed.

== Overview by country ==
Time (in years) required for good-faith adverse possession

Time (in years) required for bad-faith adverse possession

=== Time required to acquire land via adverse possession by country ===
- Argentina
  - 20 years for bad-faith possession
  - 10 years for good-faith possession
- Australia
  - Unregistered land: 12 years (NSW, Queensland, Western Australia and Tasmania) or 15 years (Victoria and South Australia)
  - Registered land: Not allowed
  - Crown land: 30 years (NSW and Tasmania), not allowed (Queensland, Western Australia and Victoria)
- Brazil
  - 5 years. Not allowed for public land.
  - Article 183 and 191 of the Brazilian Constitution
- Canada
  - Ontario
    - Land registered under Land Titles: Not allowed
    - Land registered before Land Titles: 10 years
    - Crown land: 60 years
- Chile
  - 10 years for bad-faith possession
  - 5 years for good-faith possession
- China: Not allowed
- England and Wales
  - 12 years for unregistered land or land where the squatter can show 12 years adverse possession prior to 13 October 2003
  - 10 years for registered land if the true owner does not file a counternotice after being notified at the end of the period
- France
  - 30 years for bad-faith possession
  - 10–20 years for good-faith possession, depending on whether true owner lives in the territory of the Court of Appeal where the land is situated
- Germany: 30 years
- Greece
  - 20 years for bad-faith possession
  - 10 years for good-faith possession
- Hong Kong
  - 12 years for private property
  - 60 years for public property (Crown Land)
  - Section 7 of the Limitation Ordinance
- Hungary: 15 years
- India
  - 12 years for private property
  - 30 years for public property
- Ireland
  - 12 years for private property
  - 30 years for public property
- Japan
  - 20 years for bad-faith possession
  - 10 years for good-faith possession
  - Article 162 of Civil Code
- Mexico
  - 10 years for bad-faith possession
  - 5 years for good-faith possession
- Netherlands
  - 20 years for bad-faith possession
  - 10 years for good-faith possession
- New Zealand
  - Unregistered land: 12 years
  - Registered land: 20 years
  - Unregistered crown land: 60 years
  - Registered crown land: Not allowed
- Peru
  - 10 years for bad-faith possession
  - 5 years for good-faith possession
- Poland
  - 30 years for bad-faith possession
  - 20 years for good-faith possession
  - Article 172 of Civil Code
- Portugal
  - 20 years for bad-faith possession
  - 15 years for good-faith possession
- Scotland
  - Registered land: 10 years
  - Special cases: 20 years
- Singapore
  - 12 years for good-faith possession
  - The land must be in possession before 1 March 1982, 12 years before adverse possession is abolished with effect from 1 March 1994 as per section 50 of the Land Titles Act.
  - Section 9(1) of the Limitation Act 1959 and Section 50 of the Land Titles Act 1993
- Spain
  - 30 years for bad-faith possession
  - 10–20 years for good-faith possession, depending on whether true owner is present or absent in the country
- Sweden
  - 20 years for bad-faith possession
  - 10 years for good-faith possession
- Switzerland
  - Unregistered land: 30 years
  - Incorrectly registered land: 10 years
  - Registered land: Not allowed

== England and Wales ==
Adverse possession is one of the most contentious methods of acquiring property, albeit one that has played a huge role in the history of English land. Historically, if someone possessed land for long enough, it was thought that this in itself justified acquisition of a good title. This meant that while English land was continually conquered, pillaged, and stolen by various factions, lords or barons throughout the Middle Ages, those who could show they possessed land long enough would not have their title questioned.

A more modern function has been that land which is disused or neglected by an owner may be converted into another's property if continual use is made. Squatting in England has been a way for land to be efficiently utilised, particularly in periods of economic decline. Before the Land Registration Act 2002, if a person had possessed land for 12 years, then at common law, the previous owner's right of action to eject the "adverse possessor" would expire. The common legal justification was that under the Limitation Act 1623 (21 Jas. 1. c. 16), just like a cause of action in contract or tort had to be used within a time limit, so did an action to recover land. This promoted the finality of litigation and the certainty of claims. Time would start running when someone took exclusive possession of land, or part of it, and intended to possess it adversely to the interests of the current owner. Provided the common law requirements of "possession" that was "adverse" were fulfilled, after 12 years, the owner would cease to be able to assert a claim. Different rules are in place for the limitation periods of adverse possession in unregistered land and registered land. However, in the Land Registration Act 2002 adverse possession of registered land became much harder.

In recent times the Land Registry has made the process of claiming adverse possession and being awarded "title absolute" more difficult. Simply occupying or grazing the land will no longer justify the grant of title: instead, the person in adverse possession must demonstrate commitment to own and utilize the land to the exclusion of all others.

Another significant limit on the principle, in the case of leases, is that adverse possession actions will only succeed against the leaseholder, and not the freeholder once the lease has expired.

=== Land Registration Act 2002 ===
The Land Registration Act 2002 received royal assent on 26 February 2002. The rules for unregistered land remained as before. But under schedule 6 of the Land Registration Act 2002, paragraphs 1 to 5, after 10 years the adverse possessor is entitled to apply to the registrar to become the new registered owner. The registrar then contacts the registered title holder and notifies him of the application. If no proceedings are launched for two years to eject the adverse possessor, only then would the registrar transfer title. Prior to the Land Registration Act 2002, a land owner could simply lose title without being aware of it or notified. This was the rule because it indicated the owner had never paid sufficient attention to how the land was in fact being used, and therefore the former owner did not deserve to keep it. Before 2002, time was seen to cure everything. The rule's function was to ensure land was used efficiently.

=== Requirements ===
Before the considerable hurdle of giving a registered owner notice was introduced in the Land Registration Act 2002, the particular requirements of adverse possession were reasonably straightforward.

First, under schedule 1, paragraphs 1 and 8 of the Limitation Act 1980, the time when adverse possession began was when "possession" was taken. This had to be more than something temporary or transitory, such as simply storing goods on a land for a brief period. But "possession" did not require actual occupation. So in Powell v McFarlane, it was held to be "possession" when Mr Powell, from the age of 14, let his cows roam into Mr McFarlane's land. The intruder must also show that they were dealing with the land as an occupying owner might have done, and that no one else had done so.

Second, there needed to be an intention to possess the land. Mr Powell lost his claim because simply letting his cows roam was an equivocal act: it was only later that there was evidence he intended to take possession, for instance by erecting signs on the land and parking a lorry. But this had not happened long enough for the 12-year time limit on McFarlane's claim to have expired. As a result, proving intention to possess is likely to rely heavily on the factual matrix of the case and the squatters' factual possession. In Clowes Developments (UK) Ltd v Walters and Others [2005] EWHC (Ch), the squatter cannot be found to have an intention to possess if they mistakenly believe that they are on the property with the permission of the title owner.

Third, possession is not considered "adverse" if the person is there with the owner's consent. For example, in BP Properties Ltd v Buckler, Lord Justice Dillon held that Mrs Buckler could not claim adverse possession over land owned by BP because BP had told her she could stay rent free for life. Fourth, under the Limitation Act 1980 sections 29 and 30, the adverse possessor must not have acknowledged the title of the owner in any express way, or the clock starts running again. However, the courts have interpreted this requirement flexibly.

=== Human rights challenges ===
In JA Pye (Oxford) Ltd v Graham, Mr. and Mrs. Graham had been let a part of Mr. Pye's land, and then the lease had expired. Mr. Pye refused to renew a lease, on the basis that this might disturb getting planning permission. In fact the land remained unused, Mr. Pye did nothing, while the Grahams continued to retain a key to the property and used it as part of their farm. At the end of the limitation period, they claimed the land was theirs. They had in fact offered to buy a license from Mr. Pye, but the House of Lords held that this did not amount to an acknowledgement of title that would deprive them of a claim. Having lost in the UK courts, Mr. Pye took the case to the European Court of Human Rights, arguing that his business should receive £10 million in compensation because it was a breach of his right to "peaceful enjoyment of possessions" under Protocol 1, article 1 of the European Convention on Human Rights. The court in its Grand Chamber rejected this, holding that it was within a national government's margin of appreciation to determine the relevant property rules. The House of Lords in Ofulue v Bossert in 2009 confirmed this understanding.

=== Timing ===
For registered land, adverse possession claims completed before 13 October 2003 (the date the Land Registration Act 2002 came into force) are governed by section 75(1) and 75(2) of the Land Registration Act 1925. The limitation period remains the same (12 years) but instead of the original owner's title to the land being extinguished, the original owner holds the land on trust for the adverse possessor. The adverse possessor can then apply to be the new registered proprietor of the land.

For registered land, adverse possession claims completed after 13 October 2003 follow a different procedure. Where land is registered, the adverse possessor may henceforth apply to be registered as owner after 10 years of adverse possession and the Land Registry must give notice to the true owner of this application. This gives the landowner a statutory period of time (65 business days) to object to the adverse possession, object to the application on the ground that there has not actually been the necessary ten years' adverse possession, or to serve a counter-notice. If a counter-notice is served, then the application fails unless

- it would be unconscionable because of an equity by estoppel for the registered proprietor to seek to dispossess the squatter and the squatter ought in the circumstances to be registered as proprietor, or
- the squatter is for some other reason entitled to be registered as proprietor, or
- the squatter has been in adverse possession of land adjacent to their own under the mistaken but reasonable belief that they are the owner of it, the exact line of the boundary with this adjacent land has not been determined and the estate to which the application relates was registered more than a year prior to the date of the application.

Otherwise, the squatter becomes the registered proprietor according to the land registry. If the true owner is unable to evict the squatter in the two years following the first [unsuccessful] application, the squatter can apply again after this period and be successful despite the opposition of the owner. The process effectively prevents the removal of a landowner's right to property without their knowledge, while ensuring squatters have a fair way of exercising their rights.

Where a tenant adversely possesses land, there is a presumption that they are doing so in a way that will benefit the landlord at the end of their term. If the land does not belong to their landlord, the land will become part of both the tenancy and the reversion. If the land does belong to their landlord, it would seem that it will be gained by the tenant but only for the period of their term.

Since September 2012, squatting in a residential building is a criminal offence, but this does not prevent title being claimed by reason of adverse possession even if the claimant is committing a criminal offence. This was confirmed in Best v Chief Land Registrar, where it was held that criminal and land law should be kept separate.

== United States ==
The number of years required for adverse possession in U.S. states

=== Requirements ===
The party seeking title by adverse possession may be called the disseisor, meaning one who dispossesses the true owner of the property. Although the elements of an adverse possession claim may be different in a number of states, adverse possession requires at a minimum five basic conditions being met to perfect the title of the disseisor. These are that the disseisor must openly occupy the property exclusively, in a manner that is open and notorious, continuously, and use it as if it were their own in a manner expected for the type of property. Some states impose additional requirements. Many of the states have enacted statutes regulating the rules of adverse possession.

An inherent part of adverse possession is that it is hostile. However, hostility in this context has nothing to do with violence or aggression; hostility simply means that the adverse possessor's claim is in opposition to the owner's claim to the land. This means that a renter or guest of the owner cannot claim adverse possession, since the owner gave them permission to occupy the property. A claim of adverse possession may thus be defeated by the owner's proving that they gave explicit permission for the occupancy of the property by the party attempting to claim adverse possession.

That said, not all jurisdictions have a requirement that the adverse possession be in good faith. For example, after national outrage over an apparently bad faith attempt at adverse possession, Colorado changed its laws to include a requirement that the party claiming adverse possession must do so in good faith. Previously, Colorado had no explicit good faith requirement, which left open the possibility that adverse possession could be in bad faith and still potentially be legal. Good faith means that claimants must demonstrate that they had some basis to believe that they actually owned the property at issue. Four states east of the Mississippi that require good faith in some form are Georgia, Illinois, New York, and Wisconsin.

==== Additional requirements ====
In addition to the basic elements of an adverse possession case, state law may require one or more additional elements to be proved by a person claiming adverse possession. Depending upon the state, additional requirements may include:

- Color of title, claim of title, or claim of right. Color of title and claim of title involve a legal document that appears (incorrectly) to give the disseisor title. In some jurisdictions the mere intent to take the land as one's own may constitute "claim of right", with no documentation required. Other cases have determined that a claim of right exists if the person believes they have rightful claim to the property, even if that belief is mistaken. A negative example would be a timber thief who sneaks onto a property, cuts timber not visible from the road, and hauls the logs away at night. Their actions, though they demonstrate actual possession, also demonstrate knowledge of guilt, as opposed to claim of right.
- Good faith (in a minority of states) or bad faith (sometimes called the "Maine Doctrine" although it is now abolished in Maine)
- Improvement, cultivation, or enclosure
- Payment of property taxes. This may be required by statute, such as in California, or just a contributing element to a court's determination of possession. Both payment by the disseisor and by the true owner are relevant.
- Dispossession of land owned by a governmental entity: Generally, a disseisor cannot dispossess land legally owned by a government entity even if all other elements of adverse possession are met. One exception is when the government entity is acting like a business rather than a government entity.

=== Consequences ===
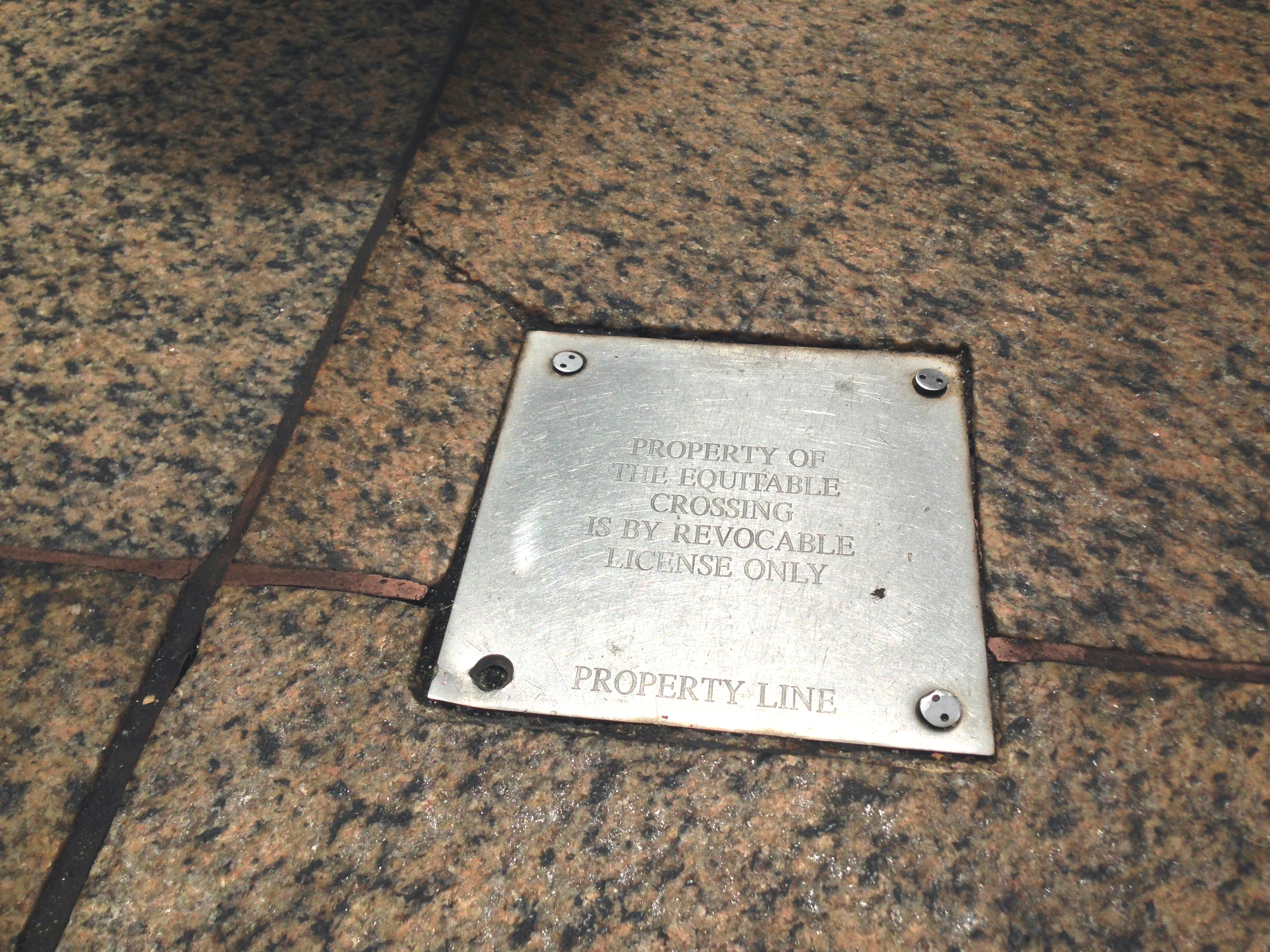
A metal plaque on the sidewalk of New York City declares that the crossing onto the private property is a revocable license (an agreement to use the property, not an invasion) to protect it from becoming a subject of an adverse possession. Some New York property owners go even further by actually closing their property to the public for one day each year in order to prove their exclusive control.

A disseisor will be committing a civil trespass on the property he has taken and the owner of the property could cause him to be evicted by an action in trespass ("ejectment") or by bringing an action for possession. All common law jurisdictions require that an ejectment action be brought within a specified time, after which the true owner is assumed to have acquiesced. The effect of a failure by the true landowner to evict the adverse possessor depends on the jurisdiction, but will eventually result in title by adverse possession.

In 2008, due to the volume of adverse possession and boundary dispute cases throughout New York City, the New York State Legislature amended and limited the ability of land to be acquired by adverse possession. Prior to the 2008 amendment, to acquire property by adverse possession, all that was required was a showing that the possession constituted an actual invasion of or infringement upon the owner's rights. Approximately eight years after the 2008 amendment, on 30 June 2016, the New York State Appellate Division, First Department (i.e., the appellate court covering the territory of Manhattan) determined the legal questions concerning the scope of rights acquired by adverse possession and how the First Department would treat claims of adverse possession where title had vested prior to 2008. The Court specifically held that title to the adversely possessed property vested when the plaintiff "satisfie[d] the requirement of the statute in effect at the relevant time." In other words, if title had vested at some time "after" the 2008 amendment, a plaintiff would have to satisfy the adverse possession standards amended by the New York State Legislature in 2008; however, if title vested at some time "before" the 2008 amendment, a plaintiff would have lawfully acquired title to the disputed area by satisfying the pre-amendment standard for adverse possession. Hudson Square Hotel also resolved two often highly litigated issues in adverse possession cases where the air rights are more valuable than the underlying land itself: (a) "where" (i.e., in three-dimensional physical space) is an encroachment required in order for such encroachment to have any relevant operative effect or consequences under the law of adverse possession, and (b) "what" property rights are acquired as a result of title to the ground floor area (i.e., the land) vesting with the plaintiff. In Hudson Square Hotel the defendant argued that the plaintiff had only acquired title to the underlying land, but not the air rights, because the plaintiff never encroached above the two-story building. This argument was motivated, in part, by the fact that the zoning laws at the time permitted the owner of the land to build (i.e., develop) up to six times the square footage of the ground floor area. For example, if the disputed area was 1,000 square feet, there would be 6,000 square feet of buildable square footage to potentially be won or lost by adverse possession. The Court clarified, "It is the encroachment on the land ... that allows title to pass to the adverse possessor." In other words, the plaintiff did not need to encroach upon all six stories in order to adversely possess the air rights above the land. The Court also held, "With title to land come air rights." In other words, by acquiring title to the land (i.e., ground floor area), the plaintiff also acquired ownership of the more valuable air rights that were derivative of title to the underlying land.

In other jurisdictions, the disseisor acquires merely an equitable title; the landowner is considered to be a trustee of the property for the disseisor.

Adverse possession extends only to the property actually possessed. If the original owner had a title to a greater area (or volume) of property, the disseisor does not obtain all of it. The exception to this is when the disseisor enters the land under a color of title to an entire parcel, their continuous and actual possession of a small part of that parcel will perfect their title to the entire parcel defined in their color of title. Thus a disseisor need not build a dwelling on, or farm on, every portion of a large tract in order to prove possession, as long as their title does correctly describe the entire parcel.

In some jurisdictions, a person who has successfully obtained title to property by adverse possession may (optionally) bring an action in land court to "quiet title" of record in their name on some or all of the former owner's property. Such action will make it simpler to convey the interest to others in a definitive manner, and also serves as notice that there is a new owner of record, which may be a prerequisite to benefits such as equity loans or judicial standing as an abutter. Even if such action is not taken, the title is legally considered to belong to the new titleholder, with most of the benefits and duties, including paying property taxes to avoid losing title to the tax collector. The effects of having a stranger to the title paying taxes on property may vary from one jurisdiction to another. (Many jurisdictions have accepted tax payment for the same parcel from two different parties without raising an objection or notifying either party that the other had also paid.)

Adverse possession does not typically work against property owned by the public.

Where land is registered under a Torrens title registration system or similar, special rules apply. It may be that the land cannot be affected by adverse possession (as was the case in England and Wales from 1875 to 1926, and as is still the case in the state of Minnesota) or that special rules apply.

Adverse possession may also apply to territorial rights. In the United States, Georgia lost an island in the Savannah River to South Carolina in 1990, when South Carolina had used fill from dredging to attach the island to its own shore. Since Georgia knew of this yet did nothing about it, the U.S. Supreme Court (which has original jurisdiction in such matters) granted this land to South Carolina, although the Treaty of Beaufort (1787) explicitly specified that the river's islands belonged to Georgia.

=== Louisiana ===
Louisiana, which is a civil law state, adopts the legal doctrine of acquisitive prescription. It is derived from French law and governs the right of a person to gain possession of immovable property (a home). Pursuant to Civil Code Article 742, there are two ways that a squatter can gain possession of an immovable property: (1) peaceable and uninterrupted possession... for ten years in good faith and by just title; [or] (2) uninterrupted possession for thirty years without title or good faith.

== Squatter's rights ==
Most cases of adverse possession deal with boundary line disputes between two parties who hold clear title to their property. The term "squatter's rights" has no precise and fixed legal meaning. In some jurisdictions the term refers to temporary rights available to squatters that prevent them, in some circumstances, from being removed from property without due process. For example, in England and Wales reference is usually to section 6 of the Criminal Law Act 1977. In the United States, no ownership rights are created by mere possession, and a squatter may only take possession through adverse possession if the squatter can prove all elements of an adverse possession claim for the jurisdiction in which the property is located.

As with any adverse possession claim, if a squatter abandons the property for a period, or if the rightful owner effectively removes the squatter's access even temporarily during the statutory period, or gives their permission, the "clock" usually stops. For example, if the required period in a given jurisdiction is twenty years and the squatter is removed after only 15 years, the squatter loses the benefit of that 15-year possession (i.e., the clock is reset at zero). If that squatter later retakes possession of the property, that squatter must, to acquire title, remain on the property for a full 20 years after the date on which the squatter retook possession. In this example, the squatter would have held the property for 35 years (the original 15 years plus the later 20 years) to acquire title.

Depending on the jurisdiction, one squatter may or may not pass along continuous possession to another squatter, known as "tacking". Tacking is defined as "The joining of consecutive periods of possession by different persons to treat the periods as one continuous period; esp., the adding of one's own period of land possession to that of a prior possessor to establish continuous adverse possession for the statutory period." There are three types of Privity: Privity of Contract; Privity of Possession; and Privity of Estate. One of the three types of privity is required in order for one adverse possessor to "tack" their time onto another adverse possessor in order to complete the statutory time period. One way tacking occurs is when the conveyance of the property from one adverse possessor to another is founded upon a written document (usually an erroneous deed), indicating "color of title". A lawful owner may also restart the clock at zero by giving temporary permission for the occupation of the property, thus defeating the necessary "continuous and hostile" element. Evidence that a squatter paid rent to the owner would defeat adverse possession for that period.

=== England and Wales ===
Although "squatting" is a criminal offence in England and Wales under Section 144 of the Legal Aid, Sentencing and Punishment of Offenders Act 2012, the Court of Appeal has clarified that Section 144 will not bar a person who wants to claim adverse possession, based on the rule of ex turpi causa, from relying on illegal squatting as an act demonstrating possession of the property. However, the 2012 Act also inserted an immediate police power of entry to the premises into Section 17 of the Police and Criminal Evidence Act 1984.

Section 17 of the Limitation Act 1980 means the old title holder's estate will be extinguished and a new one will be created for the successful squatter.

Finally, schedule 6 (para 7) of the Land Registration Act 2002 allows the successful adverse possessor to be registered as the new proprietor.

== Theory and scholarship ==
=== Utilitarianism ===
Scholars have identified four utilitarian policies which justify adverse possession.

The first is that it exists to cure potential or actual defects in real estate titles by putting a statute of limitations on possible litigation over ownership and possession. Because of the doctrine of adverse possession, a landowner can be secure in title to their land. Otherwise, long-lost heirs of any former owner, possessor or lien holder of centuries past could come forward with a legal claim on the property.

The second theory is that adverse possession is "a useful method for curing minor title defects". For example, someone may have had the intention to sell all of a parcel of land but mistakenly excluded a portion of it on the title. Thus, adverse possession allows the purchaser of the land to maintain ownership of the parcel which they believed was theirs from the impressions given by the seller.

The third theory is that adverse possession encourages and rewards productive use of land: By vesting title in the industrious settler, rather than the absentee titleholder, adverse possession promotes the highest and best use of land. Some scholars have advanced this argument, claiming incremental improvements in land use, but other scholars have argued adverse possession is not merely evidence of incremental change and instead acts as a more holistic land management system.

The fourth theory is that the adverse possessor places a high personal value on the land while the real title holder has effectively abandoned it, thus on principles of personhood and efficiency it makes sense to allow the change in title.

=== Copyright scholarship ===
Some legal scholars have proposed the extension of the concept of adverse possession to intellectual property law, in particular to reconcile intellectual property and antitrust law or to unify copyright law and property law.

== See also ==
- Adverse possession in Australia
- Appropriation (economics)
- Informal settlement
- Title (property)
- Pedis possessio ("possession of the foot"): ownership by first occupier
- Squatting: unauthorized use of abandoned property with no implied ownership or right to use
- Usucaption: acquisitive prescription ownership after defined period of unauthorized occupation
- Uti possidetis
- Preemption Act of 1841: acquisitive prescription law in USA
- Rights of way in England and Wales
- Usufruct: acquired right to use but not own property
- Revised statute 2477: highways and paths law in USA
- Easement: for related adverse rights
- Lien: right of others to hold or sell to solve debt
- List of real estate topics
- Possession is nine-tenths of the law
- Property law
- Property rights
- Deed: legal document defining interest or ownership
- Adverse abandonment

== Works cited ==
- Merrill, Thomas W. (1985). "Property Rules, Liability Rules, and Adverse Possession". Northwestern University Law Review. 79 (5 & 6): 1122–54.
- Merrill, Thomas W.; Smith, Henry E. (2017). Property: Principles and Policies. University Casebook Series (3rd ed.). St. Paul: Foundation Press. ISBN 978-1-62810-102-7.
