= Abutter =

Legal term for someone whose property is next to another's

An abutter is a person (or entity) whose property is adjacent to the property of another. In jurisdictions such as Massachusetts, New Hampshire, and Nova Scotia, it is a defined legal term. Some jurisdictions, such as Virginia, may use the term adjacent landowner, while others, such as California, use the term adjoining landowner, and the United States Environmental Protection Agency defines rights of contiguous property owners (CPO).

In land use regulations, concerns of an abutter may be given special attention, being the one most likely to suffer specific harm from a hasty, uninformed decision. For example, a developer requesting a subdivision may be required to notify (or pay to notify) all abutters of the proposal and invite them to a public hearing. Regulations may also provide an abutter with the right to be heard at the hearing, unlike others who must request permission to be heard, at the discretion of the board.

In the spirit of land use politics, even the unified voices of the concerned abutters may sound only faintly against the machinery of "progress" or well-funded special interests. However, the courts will objectively consider a proper case brought by an abutter whose rights have been arguably under-appreciated. Generally, the more abutters interested in a project, the more likely someone will object to it.

Some regulations otherwise expand or limit the participation of local owners, as where notice may be required for "anyone whose property is within 200 feet of any point of the parcel under consideration." Another expansive definition would include those whose properties are across a public way or flowing waterway, where the parcels do not actually touch. Contrarily, regulations may define "abutter" to include only those people who hold record title to an adjacent parcel, thus undermining the rights of tenants, associations and partial owners (e.g., mineral rights and easement owners) to be notified, let alone heard on a proposal. This would also eliminate participation of owners of unrecorded title, such as adverse possession or those who have simply failed to record a deed or settle an estate involving the adjacent property.
