= Old Pyrmont Cottages =

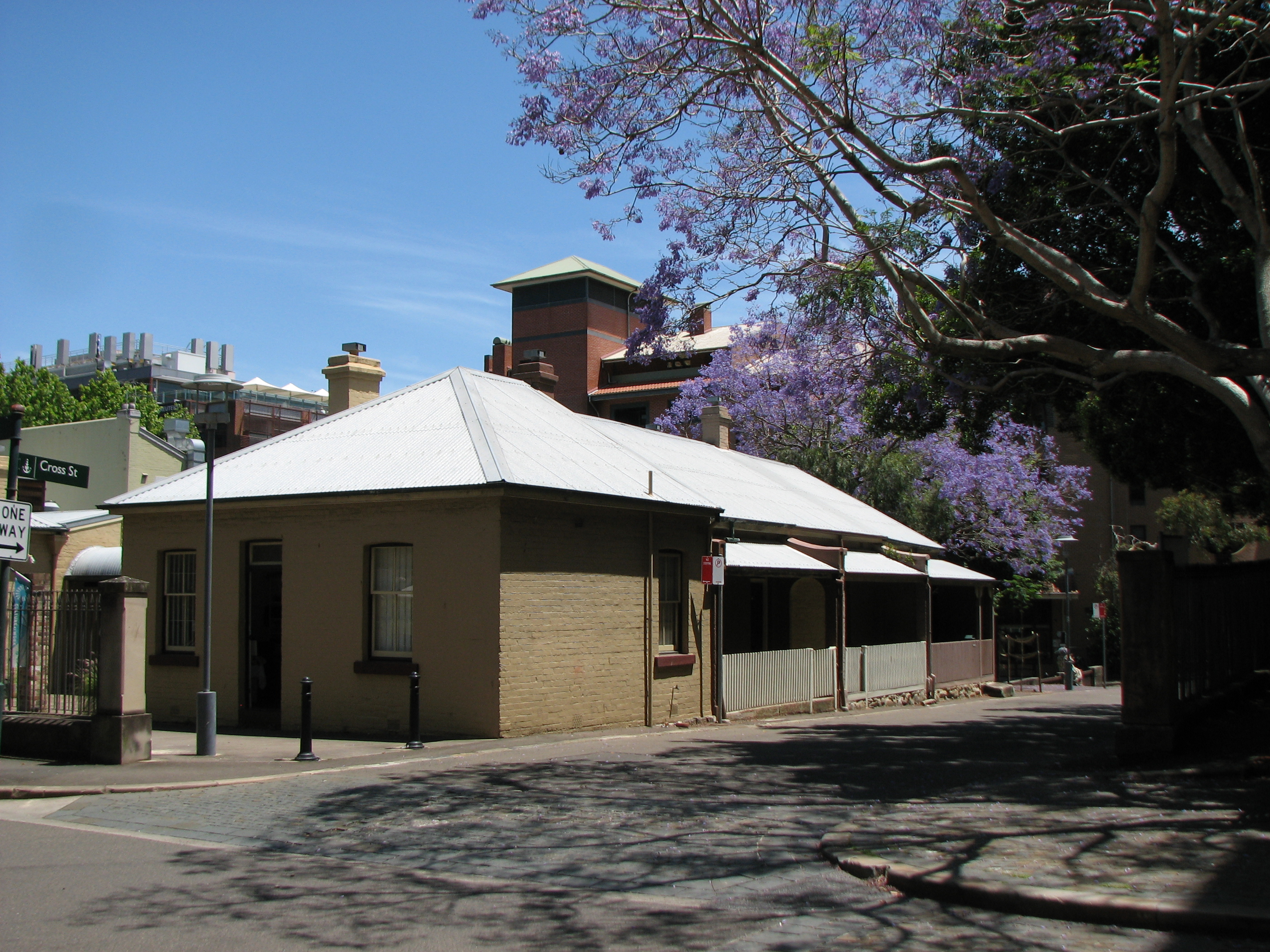
- Old Pyrmont Cottages 1, 3 and 5 Cross Street, Pyrmont, NSW

- Location within Sydney Location within Australia
- 33°52′00″S 151°11′34″E
- Location: 1, 3, 5 Cross Street, Pyrmont, City of Sydney, New South Wales, Australia

History
- Built: 1879–1895

Site notes
- Owner: Sydney Harbour Foreshore Authority (SHFA)

New South Wales Heritage Register
- Official name: Old Pyrmont Cottages; Cross & Scott Street Terraces
- Type: State heritage (built)
- Designated: 25 August 2017
- Reference no.: 1986
- Type: Cottage
- Category: Residential buildings (private)

Old Pyrmont Cottages is a heritage-listed cottage at 1, 3, 5 Cross Street in the inner city Sydney suburb of Pyrmont in the City of Sydney local government area of New South Wales, Australia. It was built from 1879 to 1895. It is also known as Cross & Scott Street Terraces. The property is owned by the Sydney Harbour Foreshore Authority (SHFA). It was added to the New South Wales State Heritage Register on 25 August 2017.

== History ==
Until recently it has been assumed that the original indigenous peoples who inhabited the Pyrmont Peninsula were the Gadigal clan group of the Eora Nation. There are about 29 clan groups of the Sydney metropolitan area, referred to collectively as the Eora Nation groups in the Sydney area. With the invasion of the Sydney region, the Gadigal people were decimated but there are descendants of the Eora still living in Sydney today. The surrounding bush land contains remnants of traditional plant, bird and animal life with fish and rock oysters available from Blackwattle Bay. Eora being a European nomenclature for the original "nation" that inhabited the land However, recent research suggests that the Gadigal habitually used the land east of the ridge that runs down the spine of central Sydney, separating Tallawolodah (The Rocks) and Tar-ra (Dawes Point) from what became known as Millers Point, while those who lived around Go-mo-ra (known to Europeans as Darling Harbour) may have formed a separate clan from the generally recognised Gadigal. Tentatively named the Gommerigal, this group has yet to be officially recognised but early settler documents point to its existence. The first governor, Arthur Phillip, listed the Gomerrigal [sic] in 1790 as among "other Tribes that live near us". Early records locate these people at Long Cove, the place that eventually became known as Darling Harbour, and as late as 1830 Absalom West recognised a 'Darling Harbour "tribe'". The probable territory of the Gommerigal included land around Darling Harbour from Millers Point on the east, and Pyrmont on the west, at least back to Blackwattle Bay.

Disease and dislocation altered the clan and nation affiliation of the Indigenous people who frequented Pyrmont, probably known to them as Pirrama, but sparse European settlement and the presence of a good natural spring of fresh water, rock shelters, sandy beaches and good fishing grounds ensured that they continued to visit the place until well into the 19th Century.

Springs, where freshwater continually seeped out of cracks in outcrops of sandstone, were particularly valuable to Aboriginal people and then the European colonists on rocky peninsulas like Pyrmont, because freshwater creeks lay some distance away. One of these springs was located at Pyrmont and became known as Tinker's Well. This spring was located in a large sandstone overhang, and water collected into a natural dish in the sandstone floor of the shelter. In the early 20th century, an old Pyrmont resident recalled that "through the mosses and ferns" of the overhang "trickled musically a small stream of pure, cold water". Other Pyrmont residents recalled evidence of the Aboriginal use of Tinker's Well, describing "numerous mussel shells" and other shellfish that were still visible near the spring in the early 20th century. These were almost certainly signs of an Aboriginal campsite, or midden. Residents also recalled that the natural bowl under the spring had been "roughly carved out" long before it was enlarged by European quarrymen, and it seems likely that this was done by Aboriginal people using the spring.

Aboriginal people continued to live in the Pyrmont area into the 19th century, but quarrying and intense industrial and urban development in the area has destroyed most traces of their presence both before and after the arrival of Europeans. The shelter containing Tinker's Well was destroyed in the early 20th century, but water continues to flow down sandstone outcrops behind a modern apartment building nearby in the vicinity of the original spring. (Irish and Goward)

=== Colonial history ===
Early settlers, without regard to Indigenous ownership of the land, received land grants from the Crown in the late 18th century. The majority of the Pyrmont peninsula was granted or acquired in the early years of the colony by Surgeon John Harris, with the exception of 22 hectares (55 acres) of the point facing Darling Harbour, which was granted to Thomas Jones, a private in the NSW Corps in 1795. The Old Pyrmont Cottages are located within Jones' 55 hectares (140 acres). The land was not developed for many years. It was acquired by Sergeant Obadiah Ikin before being sold in 1799 to the prominent colonial businessman, John Macarthur. Macarthur is said to have named the area "Pyrmont" in 1806 after a spa town in Germany because of the freshwater spring known as Tinker's Well. Macarthur briefly manufactured salt at Pyrmont and constructed a windmill there. After Macarthur's death, his son Edward began clearing the land for subdivision, the windmill was demolished and Harris Street was extended to the estate in 1836. The initial subdivision was placed on the market in 1839-40 and sold well, however when the next lots were released an economic depression had begun and most of these blocks, including the site of the Old Pyrmont Cottages, did not sell. In the nineteenth century Pyrmont proved more attractive to quarrying, waterfront industry and commercial property speculators than those wanting to build large residences.

The main development that took place after the 1840s depression was based around the maritime industry and related industrial activities. Pyrmont remained isolated. The continuing rural nature of the adjoining, undeveloped Ultimo Estate retarded easy access, although there was a ferry. The first Pyrmont Bridge opened in 1858, providing better access to the city and encouraging the council to improve the streets and water supply but this did not result in the expected growth and development at the northern end of the peninsula. Stone quarrying in Pyrmont had been primarily for local purposes until the 1850s when the superior quality of its sandstone was recognised. Orders for the construction of Sydney University marked the first move towards large scale quarrying operations. Growth in the residential population of Pyrmont remained slow and despite shipping activity in Pyrmont Bay and the development of the Darling Harbour goods yards in the 1870s, much of Pyrmont remained underdeveloped until the Colonial Sugar Refinery (CSR) began operations there in 1879. The population of the whole Pyrmont peninsula grew and peaked somewhere between the 1891 and 1901 censuses at around 20,000 people. Thereafter the population fell as the refinery, wool stores, flourmills and other industrial operations expanded, reaching a low of around 1,600 people in the 1981 census, when Pyrmont was being deindustrialised and urban renewal had not yet begun.

The land on which the Old Pyrmont Cottages are sited was leased by Edward Macarthur to George Wigram Allen in 1854, but initially he did little with it. Then in the late 1870s Allen began sub-leasing the lots to various people who built cottages there in response to the stimulus provided by the establishment of CSR and the Saunders Quarries. Cross and Young (later Scott) Streets were laid out, named and numbered. By 1879 some of the Old Pyrmont Cottages were in existence and being taxed by council. The last of the five cottages to be built was No 8 Scott St, constructed in 1895. The timing and diversity of the cottages' construction suggests that sub-leaseholders were developing the properties individually. It is likely that the cottages were not built by landlords then rented to tenants. Instead tenants rented the land and built a modest cottage in "vernacular" styles with whatever materials and construction techniques were readily available and without council supervision. These tenants were followed by other tenants who lived in and continually adapted the buildings to suit their residential needs. This was a common practice in the inner city and elsewhere during the 19th century.

=== Twentieth-century developments ===
In 1911 ownership of the block on which the Old Pyrmont Cottages are located was transferred to the Camden Park Estate, as part of the Allen family company holdings, where it remained until c. 1940. The houses remained tenanted but resumptions for railway extensions in 1914 lead to the demolition of houses around the site. By the 1950s most of the housing and commercial buildings in the block were considered decrepit, and the conditions that tenants endured attracted media attention. The oldest cottages on the same block, in Bowman Street, were demolished and there was increasing pressure to demolish the rest, including the Old Pyrmont Cottages, initially to make the land available for industrial uses and later for residential use. City Council, which had owned the block bounded by Bowman, Cross, Scott and Harris streets since 1952, and Landcom made an agreement in 1981 to clear the old housing stock for a new housing development - even the roadways were closed in preparation.

==== Pyrmont squats ====
In the 1970s, extensive areas occupied by inner city housing were designated by the NSW Department of Main Roads (DMR) as being required for a complicated system of freeways and roads planned to connect the western suburbs to the city. These would have obliterated parts of the residential stock of Pyrmont in the process. Hundreds of houses became "DMR affected" and residents all over the inner city became politically active in a campaign to stop these freeway developments. By the mid-1970s many of the plans had been shelved, but not before houses had become run down and in some cases tenants had been evicted. These places soon became occupied by squatters - people who moved into unoccupied premises and lived there without formal tenancy or paying rent. The idea of using surplus inner urban properties to house the unemployed and the poor had evolved into a movement and squatting was elevated to a social right. Even some elected members of the City Council supported the rights of squatters, especially in places such as Pyrmont where the community was under stress as industry left and places stood empty.

In 1978 all tenants on the block occupied by the Old Pyrmont Cottages had been evicted in anticipation of a proposed residential project but when the re-development work paused, squatters quickly moved in. Squatters remained there until 1994 despite a NSW Supreme Court ruling in favour of their eviction in 1984.

The Supreme Court judge remarked that he found it distasteful to find against the squatters as the current level of social security benefits were "inadequate for people to live at a level which is above the poverty line," but it was not his role to require council to provide emergency accommodation. At various times Sydney city aldermen and even the State Minister for Housing supported the squatters' tenure, using arguments that ranged from heritage issues to concern for housing the city's poor and unemployed in the context of housing shortages.

Squatting occurred in many different parts of Sydney at this time of housing shortages, but the "Pyrmont Squat" including the Old Pyrmont Cottages and also houses and commercial buildings in adjoining blocks was possibly the most tenacious and long lasting. Although the practice of squatting was widespread in the 1980s, it was also, by its very nature, undocumented and largely unrecorded. The Pyrmont Squat is unusual for being subject to several legal cases, including Supreme Court rulings that document the practices of squatting.

The squatters kept up a level of maintenance and weatherproofing which ensured the survival of the cottages. The recollections and private collections of squatters interviewed for the 2005 and 2011 CMPs also illustrate how they decorated and modified the Old Pyrmont Cottages and other nearby buildings, with internal and external murals and painted floors, holes in adjoining walls to facilitate light, access and escape, and the construction of shared bathroom facilities. The ways in which the squatters regulated their own communities, came together for music and other creative ventures, furnished their living spaces, and raised money for court cases with a speak-easy on the corner of Harris and Scott Streets is also documented. The squatters were involved in community based organisations such as the Pyrmont Self-Help Housing Co-operative, and the tongue in cheek Republic of Pyrmont, which argued for secession on the grounds that local taxes were contributing to local destruction. These and other resident action groups were active in gaining support from the churches and trade unions in opposing the redevelopment of Pyrmont.

Following extensive demolition of nineteenth century streetscapes throughout Sydney in the post-World War II period, the general public was beginning to appreciate the historic value, charm and increasing rarity of nineteenth century vernacular buildings and streetscapes. The "Cross St Group," including the Old Pyrmont Cottages,' consisting of 109-19 Bowman St, 1-5 Cross St, 42-52 Harris St and 2-8 Scott St, were recorded by the NSW chapter of the National Trust and included on their heritage register in 1982. Then the National Trust, the RAIA (the architects' association) and RAPI (the planner's association) all supported nomination of the block for listing on the statutory heritage list of the Australian Government, the Register of the National Estate, which finally took place in 1998. Several studies of the Old Pyrmont Cottages were commissioned in the early 1990s. The heritage consultants Godden Mackay prepared a conservation plan in 1993 for City West but this remained a policy document rather than being endorsed as a conservation plan because entry to the buildings could not be obtained with the squatters still in residence. Another conservation plan was prepared by Schwager Brooks in 1994, which drew heavily on the Godden Mackay report. In the face of calls for demolition because of the dilapidated state of the buildings, all the reports argued for retention of what was by then considered to be a culturally significant remnant of nineteenth century housing stock. They also noted the significance of the cottages housing people employed in local industries and those associated with creative endeavours.

The terraces on Scott Street were depicted in 1949 by the well-known artist, Sali Herman (1898-1993) in his painting "Near the Docks." Artist John Santry (1910-1990), who grew up at No 8 Scott Street, illustrated a comic strip written by Betty Rowland for The Sydney Morning Herald in the 1940s and 50s, "The Conways." His "Point Street, Pyrmont" painting of c. 1965 depicts the area in decay. Some of the squatters themselves were also artistic. Toby Zoates (William Arthur Tobin 1946- ) lived at 6 Scott St from 1979 to 1990, where he wrote and illustrated student newspapers and made films. His animated film, "The Thief of Sydney" had its first screening at the Old Pyrmont Cottages while it was still a squat. Zoates' design work is evident in some of the political fliers and advertising material generated by the squatters.

In 1994 the squatters were rehoused in by the NSW Department of Housing and the buildings handed over to City West Development Corporation, which was tasked with redeveloping 300 hectares of inner Sydney including Pyrmont, the Bays precinct, Eveleigh and the area around Central railway station. The corporation's functions were taken over by the Sydney Harbour Foreshore Authority in 1999.

In 1995 a decision was made to sell all the cottages on the block except for the Old Pyrmont Cottages at 6 & 8 Scott Street and 1, 3 and 5 Cross Street. The buildings at 42-52 Harris Street have since been adapted for commercial use, mostly restaurants, and the adjoining block between Point Street and Cross Street was completely redeveloped into a new housing complex. The Old Pyrmont Cottages instead would be redeveloped and leased as a craft centre, partly in recognition of their previous associations with creative endeavours. The creation of studio spaces required substantial physical alterations to the interiors and rear sections of the houses, which sometimes privileged functional needs over conserving significant heritage fabric. Conservation work began in 1995 by heritage architects Clive Lucas Stapleton Partners. In 1997 a decision was made to build a modern extension connecting four of the five cottages internally, which reconfigured to provide six studios, one residential studio and one communal workshop.

The cottages were leased to the not-for-profit Centre for Contemporary Craft in 1998. The centre surrendered the lease in 2002, which was taken up by the Jewellers and Metal Workers Group until 2006. The property was unoccupied until it was taken over by "Culture at Work," a community arts charity which provides community workshops and an artist-in-residency program with the support of the City of Sydney.

== Description ==
Dating from 1879-1895 the Old Pyrmont Cottages consist of five former single-storey houses grouped around a corner in the inner Sydney suburb of Pyrmont near the mouth of Darling Harbour. Three of the cottages are on Cross Street (Nos 1, 3 and 5) and two are on Scott Street (Nos 6 and 8). One of the cottages is still in its original function as a residence (1 Cross Street) while the other four cottages have been interconnected and in 2016 are consolidated together as a community arts centre. Their back yards have also been consolidated into one terraced open space. A small brick building housing a toilet for No 1 Cross Street survives on the north east corner of the consolidated backyard.

No 6 Scott Street is a two roomed, single storey, brick, rectangular plan, hipped roof cottage. It was constructed in 1879 for Henry Anderson, a blacksmith, and is an example of a vernacular version of a Victorian Georgian-styled cottage. Built on the street alignment, its facade features a pair of double hung sash windows either side of an offset central front door. Originally roofed in timber shingle, the roof is now clad in corrugated iron. Its rear external wall and an internal wall have been removed, and a single storey metal clad extension added at the rear, with other internal alterations and additions.

No 8 Scott Street was built in 1895 on the last vacant site on the block. It is built in brick with an iron roof on a corner site, facing both Scott and Cross Streets. Its front elevation facing Scott Street has an offset central doorway flanked on either side by a single double hung sash window below a hipped roof, with a single window facing the Cross Street elevation. The mid-1990s conservation works involved the provision of a covered way between the two cottages at 6 and 8 Scott Street, the re-roofing of the buildings and a new fence to the street. Its original form is similar to No 6 but less altered internally. Outbuildings between these two houses have been demolished, and they are now connected by a covered way.

Attached to No 8 Scott Street are two of the Cross Street cottages, nos 3 and 5. They are both single storey brick cottages, clad in weatherboards. At no. 5 Cross Street only the street facade and one original front room survives, while at no 3. only the street facade and two original front rooms survive. The street elevation to both nos 3 and 5 Cross Street have an offset centrally placed double hung sash window and front door with a convex verandah roof supported on brick fin walls. The rear wings and outbuildings of nos 3 and 5 Cross Street have been demolished and replaced by a single-storey metal clad extension across both former houses.

The cottage at no. 1 Cross Street is a typical worker's cottage in the Victorian Georgian style. First recorded in 1882, it is a single storey freestanding weatherboard house with main gable iron roof and a timber framed verandah facing Cross Street. The original utility wing at the rear has been removed and a new skillion replacing it. The cottage is attached to No.3 Cross Street but remains a separate residence, independently tenanted in 2016. It has had an attic storey added within the original roof volume. Within no. 1 Cross Street the wall and ceiling linings are timber-boarded.

All of the five cottages (old and new) are roofed in corrugated steel. Internally, where brick walls survive within the brick houses they are plastered and painted. Ceilings to original rooms are plasterboard or (in a few cases) lath-and-plaster and floors are timber boarded, with some surviving areas of original or early boards. There are remnants of checkerboard paint on some of the floors in nos 3 and 5 Cross Street surviving from the days when they were used as a squat. The additions linking the cottages, which were added by Clive Lucas Stapleton Partners heritage architects in the mid-1990s, have ripple iron linings to walls and ceilings and floors are covered with sheet vinyl.

=== Condition ===
As at 4 July 2016, the fabric of the buildings is partially intact and gives many indications of the techniques used in constructing vernacular housing in the 1870s. The place itself is only a moderately good source of information on the number of changes that have been carried out during its lifetime because physical evidence has been lost or obscured by later work. The building's fabric is good to excellent; and its archaeological potential is moderate.

== Heritage listing ==
As at 19 September 2016, the Old Pyrmont Cottages, dating from 1879-1895, are of state historical significance for their historical, associational, rarity and representative significance.

The cottages have historical significance as a surviving example of inner city working class housing built in vernacular style and used for many decades as rental accommodation. They offer some demonstration of the lifestyle and living arrangements of ordinary people who lived in inner Sydney before the 1970s, which is otherwise rarely documented. From the late 1970s to the early 1990s as part of the "Pyrmont Squat", one of the longest lived and most well-documented Sydney squats, the Old Pyrmont Cottages were a focus of the Sydney squatter movement and as such, contribute to the history of the urban conservation movement in Australia. The Old Pyrmont Cottages are of state heritage significance for their association with a variety of artistic endeavours by people who lived there or who depicted them, including the Swiss-born artist Sali Herman's 1949 painting, "Near the Dock", which depicts one of its street facades. The Old Pyrmont Cottages have state significance for their rarity as a surviving example of late 19th century small-scale, working class housing in inner city Sydney, which was once common in Sydney. They are also rare for having been used in the squatting movement of 1970s-1990s and having numerous associations with creative endeavours. The cottages are a representative example of the Victorian Georgian vernacular style typical of late 19th century single-story worker's housing.

Old Pyrmont Cottages was listed on the New South Wales State Heritage Register on 25 August 2017 having satisfied the following criteria.

The place is important in demonstrating the course, or pattern, of cultural or natural history in New South Wales.

The Old Pyrmont Cottages are of state historical significance as a surviving example of inner city rental properties built in vernacular style using materials to hand. For many decades providing rental accommodation for industrial workers and their families, this cottage group is historically associated with nearby industrial employment on the Pyrmont peninsular. The Old Pyrmont Cottages have historical significance for their demonstration of the history of ordinary people, with fabric that demonstrates something of the lifestyle and living arrangements of the ordinary, working-class people who lived in inner Sydney before the 1970s. From the late 1970s, the Old Pyrmont Cottages became one of the longest lived and most well-documented Sydney squats, known as the "Pyrmont Squat". These cottages formed a focus for the Sydney squatter movement, and the impulses of social justice and heritage conservation that converged in this movement. Thus, the Old Pyrmont Cottages are significant to the state of NSW for their contribution to the history of the urban conservation movement.

The place has a strong or special association with a person, or group of persons, of importance of cultural or natural history of New South Wales's history.

The Old Pyrmont Cottages are of state heritage significance for their association with a succession of artists who created works while residing in the cottages and/or included images of the cottages in their works. Swiss-born Sali Herman is the best known of these artists. Herman painted the Scott Street streetscape in his 1949 painting, "Near the Dock", which is in the collection of the Art Gallery of NSW where it is described as part of Herman's "catalogue of characteristic views" of "inner city architecture and life". Other artists associated with the Old Pyrmont Cottages are John Santry, who grew up there, and Toby Zoates who squatted there for many years.

The continued use of the place for a community art centre maintains this association of the cottages with creative endeavour. The cottages are continually building associations with communities of artists via the Culture at Work artist in residency program.

The place is important in demonstrating aesthetic characteristics and/or a high degree of creative or technical achievement in New South Wales.

The cottages have local landmark qualities as a group of nineteenth century vernacular weatherboard and brick cottages, small in scale, within an urban environment now dominated by high-rise apartment buildings. It was this simple, nineteenth century, working people's aesthetic which inspired Sali Herman's painting, and the creative endeavours of the squatters, who adapted and decorated the cottages, and the conservationist impulse of those squatters and the diverse set of groups and individuals who supported them and the retention of the cottages into the present.

The place has a strong or special association with a particular community or cultural group in New South Wales for social, cultural or spiritual reasons.

The Old Pyrmont Cottages displayed local social significance following the proposals for their redevelopment, which roused an enormous amount of local interest in their future in the early 1990s. Many local community groups in Pyrmont were involved in meetings concerning the future of the block.

The place has potential to yield information that will contribute to an understanding of the cultural or natural history of New South Wales.

The Old Pyrmont Cottages have local heritage significance for their potential to yield information relevant to the construction techniques and materials associated with the most modest dwellings of the c.1880 period. There is potential for sub surface deposits associated with the early development of Pyrmont and with working class lifestyles and values. The group has the potential to provide an educational and tourism resource for Pyrmont. Its streetscape and small-scale remaining rooms demonstrate something of a way of life once common on the peninsula.

The place possesses uncommon, rare or endangered aspects of the cultural or natural history of New South Wales.

The Old Pyrmont Cottages are of state heritage significance as one of the few Sydney squats for which a significant documentary record survives. The cottage group also has significance for NSW for their rarity as a mixed group of cottages, including several weatherboard buildings, and some associated open spaces including night soil lanes and areas that were essential to their functioning in the 19th century.

The place is important in demonstrating the principal characteristics of a class of cultural or natural places/environments in New South Wales.

The Old Pyrmont Cottages have state heritage significance as a surviving example of late 19th century small-scale, working class housing in inner city Sydney, built in close proximity to industrial sites that provided work for its inhabitants. Such housing was once common in Sydney but most has been demolished for redevelopment throughout the 20th century. These cottages are a representative example of the Victorian Georgian vernacular style typical of late 19th century single-story worker's housing.
