= Possession (law) =

Control a person intentionally exercises towards a thing

In law, possession is the exercise of dominion by a person over property to the exclusion of others. To possess something, a person must have an intention to possess it and an apparent purpose to assert control over it. A person may be in possession of some piece of property without being its owner. The possession of property is commonly regulated under the property law of a jurisdiction.

== Intention to possess ==
An intention to possess (sometimes called animus possidendi) is the other component of possession. All that is required for this criterion is an intention to possess something for the time being. In common law countries, the intention to possess a thing is a question of fact that can be proven by acts of control and surrounding circumstances.

It is possible to intend to possess something and to actually possess it without knowing that it exists. For example, someone who intends to possess a suitcase also intends to possess its contents even if they are unknown. It is important to distinguish between the intention sufficient to obtain possession of a thing and the intention required to commit the crime of possessing something illegally, such as banned drugs, firearms or stolen goods. The intention to exclude others from accessing a suitcase and its contents does not necessarily amount to the guilty mind of intending to possess its contents illegally.

When people possess places to which the public has access, it may be difficult to know whether they intend to possess everything within those places. In such circumstances, some people make it clear that they do not want possession of the things brought there by the public. For example, it is not uncommon to see a sign above a coat rack in a restaurant that disclaims responsibility for items left there.

== Importance of possession ==
Possession is one of the most important concepts in property law. There are three related and overlapping but not identical legal concepts: possession, right of possession and ownership.

In common law countries, possession is itself a property right. The owner of a property has the right of possession and may assign that right wholly or partially to another who may then also assign the right of possession to a third party. For example, an owner of residential property may assign the right of possession to a property manager under a property management contract, who may then assign the right of possession to a tenant under a rental agreement. There is a rebuttable presumption that the possessor of property also has the right of possession, and evidence to the contrary may be offered to establish who has the legal right of possession to determine who should have actual possession, which may include evidence of ownership (without assignment of the right of possession) or evidence of a superior right of possession without ownership. Possession of a thing for long enough can become ownership by termination of the previous owner's right of possession and ownership rights. In the same way, the passage of time can bring to an end the owner's right to recover exclusive possession of a property without losing the ownership of it, as when an adverse easement for use is granted by a court.

In civil law countries, possession is not a right but a (legal) fact, which enjoys certain protection by the law. It can provide evidence of ownership but does not in itself satisfy the burden of proof. For example, ownership of a house is never proven by mere possession of a house. Possession is a factual state of exercising control over an object, whether the object is owned or not. Only a legal (possessor has legal ground), bona fide (possessor does not know lack of right to possess) and regular possession (not acquired through force or by deceit) can become ownership over passage of time. A possessor enjoys certain judicial protection against third parties even if he is not the owner.

There may be varying degrees of rights to possession. For example, if you leave a book that belongs to you at a cafe and the waiter picks it up, you have lost possession. When you return to recover the book, even though the waiter has possession, you have a better right to possession and the book should be returned. This example demonstrates the distinction between ownership and possession: throughout the process you have not lost ownership of the book although you have lost possession at some point; or instead, the book may have been owned by a third party (such as a lending library) throughout, despite the changes in possession.

== Obtaining possession ==
Possession requires both control and intention. It is obtained from the first moment that both those conditions exist simultaneously. Usually, intention precedes control, as when you see a coin on the ground and reach down to pick it up. Nevertheless, it is conceivable that a person might obtain control of a thing before forming the intention to possess it. Someone who unknowingly sat on and therefore had control of a $10 note on the seat of a train could obtain possession by becoming aware of the note and forming the intention to possess it. People may also intend to possess things that are left without their knowledge in spaces that they control.

Possession can be obtained by a one-sided act by which factual control is established. This can take the form of apprehension (taking an object not in someone's possession) or seizure (taking an object in someone's possession). It can also be obtained through a two-sided process of handing over the possession from one party to another. The party handing over possession must intend to do so.

=== Possession acquired by consent ===
Most property possessed is obtained with the consent of someone else who possessed it. They may have been purchased, received as gifts, leased, or borrowed. The transfer of possession of goods is called delivery. For land, it is common to speak of granting or giving possession.

A temporary transfer of possession is called a bailment. Bailment is often regarded as the separation of ownership and possession. For example, the library continues to own the book while you possess it and will have the right to possess it again when your right comes to an end. A common transaction involving bailment is a conditional sale or hire-purchase, in which the seller lets the buyer have possession of the thing before it is paid for. The buyer pays the purchase price in installments and, when it is fully paid, ownership of the thing is transferred from seller to buyer.

=== Possession acquired without consent ===
It is possible to obtain possession of a thing without anyone else's consent. First, you might take possession of something which has never been possessed before. This can occur when you catch a wild animal; or create a new thing, such as a loaf of bread. Secondly, you might find something which someone else has lost. Thirdly, you might take something from another person without their consent. Possession acquired without consent is a property right which the law protects. It gives rise to a right of possession which is enforceable against everyone except those with a better right to possession.

=== Forms of transferring possession ===
There are various forms of transferring possession. One can physically hand over the object (e.g. handing over a newspaper bought at the newsstand) but it is not always necessary for the party to literally grab the object for possession to be considered transferred. It is enough that the object is within the realm of factual control (e.g. leaving a letter in the letterbox). Sometimes it is enough for a symbol of the object which enables factual control to be handed over (e.g. handing over the keys to a car or a house). One may also choose to terminate possession, as one throws a letter in the trash. Possession includes having the opportunity to terminate possession.

== See also ==
- Unlawful possession
  - Drug prohibition
  - Criminal possession of a weapon
  - Possession of stolen goods
  - Minor in Possession
- Other special conditions of possession
  - Constructive possession
  - Adverse possession
  - Right of possession
  - Debtor in possession
- Owner, Lessor, Renter, Landlord
- Land tenure
- Lessee, Renter, Tenant
- Lease, Renting, Tenancy
- Possession is nine-tenths of the law
