= Res mancipi =

Ancient Roman law

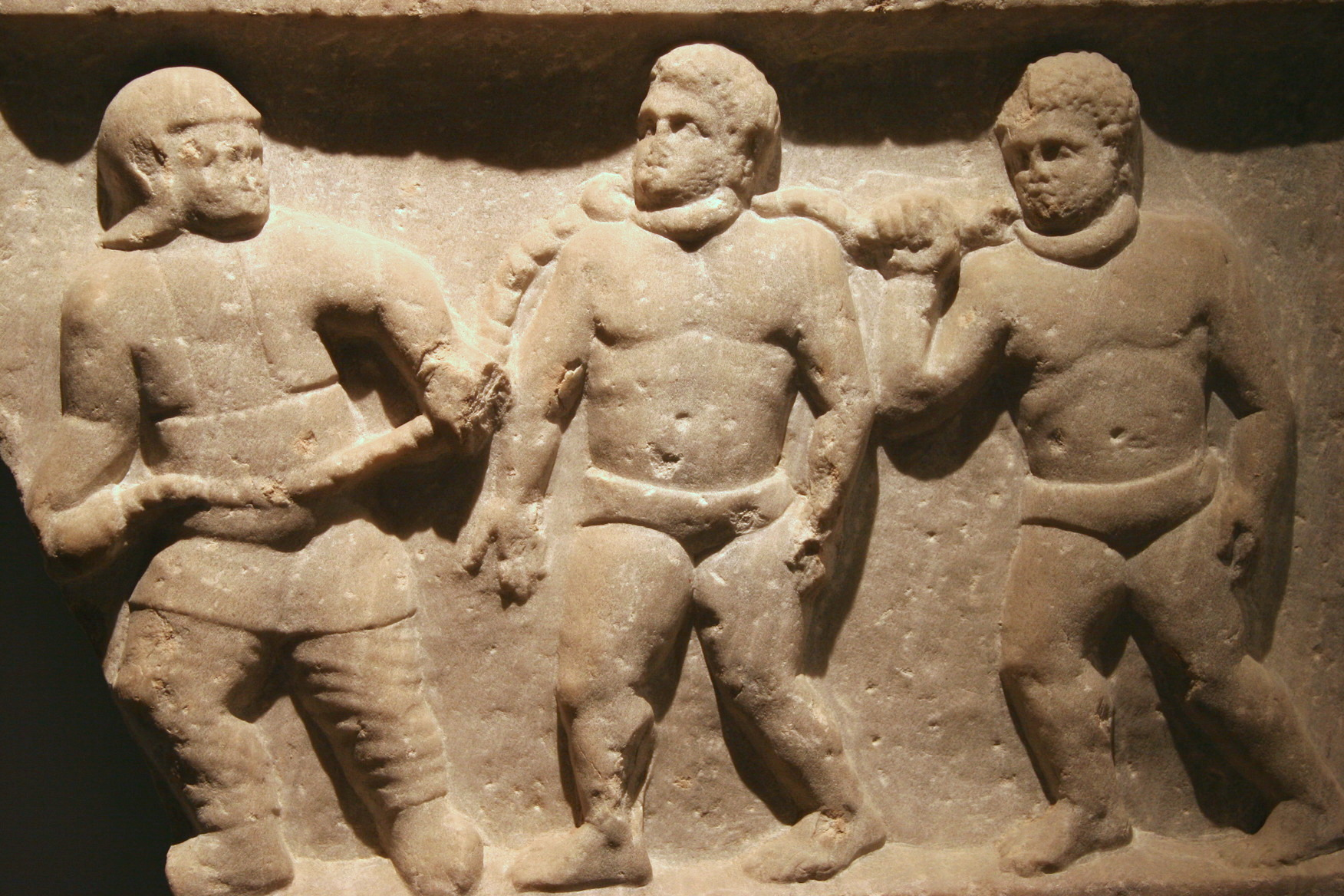
Ancient Roman slaves constituted res mancipi

Res mancipi was one of the categories of property in Roman law. The other was res nec mancipi.

Romans viewed res mancipi as that property of particular importance to them, at least in early Rome. Gaius (Institutes 2.14a - 2.22) explains the difference between the two categories of property by giving example of what constitutes res mancipi and res nec mancipi. He tells us that lands and houses on Italic soil, beasts of burden, slaves, and rustic and praedial servitudes are all res mancipi. Gaius goes on to say that res mancipi may only be conveyed formally, that is either by the mancipatio ceremony, or in iure cessio.

The distinction between res mancipi and res nec mancipi was formally abolished by Justinian in Corpus Juris Civilis.
