= Mancipatio =

Roman legal procedure

In Roman law, mancipatio (f. Latin manus, "hand"; and capere, "to take hold of") was a solemn verbal contract by which the ownership of certain types of goods (res mancipi) was transferred. Mancipatio was also the legal procedure for drawing up wills, emancipating children from their parents, and adoption.

Res mancipi were forms of property important in an early agrarian society: land, cattle, and slaves. The jurist Gaius excludes urban easements, lands located outside of Italy, intangible assets, and harness animals and pack animals apart from oxen, horses, mules, and donkeys from res mancipi. The right of ownership (dominium) for such goods was reserved to Roman citizens, the original term for which was Quirites, and therefore called a "quiritian" or a "quiritary" right.

The procedure of acquisition of a slave as property "by scales and bronze" (per aes et libram) is described by Gaius as follows: "Mancipatio is effected in the presence of not less than five witnesses, who must be Roman citizens and of the age of puberty, and also in the presence of another person of the same condition, who holds a pair of brazen scales and hence is called libripens. The purchaser, taking hold of the thing, says: Hunc ego hominem ex iure Quiritium meum esse aio isque mihi emptus esto hoc aere aeneaque libra ('I affirm that this slave is mine according to quiritary right, and he is purchased by me with this piece of bronze and scales'). He then strikes the scales with the piece of bronze, and gives it to the seller as a symbol of the price" (Institutes, I.119).

Mancipatio existed even before the Twelve Tables. It fell into disuse during the Empire and was finally abolished by the code of Justinian.
