= Repossession =

Legal right to take back property

Repossession, commonly referred to as repo, is a "self-help" type of action in which the party having the right of ownership of a property takes the property in question back from the party having right of possession without invoking court proceedings. The property may then be sold by either the financial institution or third party sellers.

The extent to which repossession is authorized, and how it may be executed, greatly varies in different jurisdictions (see below). When a lender cannot find the collateral, cannot peacefully obtain it through self-help repossession, or the jurisdiction does not allow self-help repossession, the alternative legal remedy to order the borrower to return the goods (prior to judgment) is replevin.

The security interest over the collateral is often known as a lien. The lender/creditor is known as the lienholder.

== General ==
The existence and handling of repossessions varies greatly between jurisdictions. In most jurisdictions outside of the U.S., self-help is limited to real estate, and otherwise the right of possession can only be enforced by a court or other official agents.

== United States ==
When a provision of law requires that repossession takes place, the lien holder has a non-delegatable obligation not to cause a breach of the peace (which is synonymous with disturbing the peace) in performing the repossession or the repossession will be reversed, and the party ordering the repossession will be liable for damages (or the lienholder will be held responsible). This requirement not to breach the peace includes even if the breach is caused by the debtor objecting to or resisting the repossession. In MBank El Paso v. Sanchez (1992), 836 S.W.2d 151, where a repossession agent towed away a car even after the loanee locked herself in it, the court decided that this was an unlawful breach of the peace and declared the repossession invalid. The debtor was also awarded $1,200,000 in damages from the bank involved. Repossession also generally does not apply to real property. Real property is generally subject to a cause of action known as foreclosure.

=== Procedure of a repossession ===
In the United States, repossessions are carried out pursuant to state laws that permit a creditor with a security interest in goods to take possession of those goods if the debtor defaults under the contract that created the security interest. In particular, all 50 U.S. states and the District of Columbia have enacted (with minor variations) Article 9 of the Uniform Commercial Code, which generally permits security interest holders to repossess goods if a debtor is in default and the repossession can be conducted without a breach of the peace. Being "in default" means that the debtor has failed to fulfill their obligations under the contract. The most common forms of default resulting in repossession are failing to make required payments and failing to maintain adequate insurance coverage.

Many U.S. states have enacted additional laws that apply specifically to the repossession of purchased and leased automobiles, and which are intended to afford additional consumer protections. Typical requirements include mandating that auto lenders provide consumers with opportunities to either "reinstate" or "redeem" their purchase or lease contracts after their vehicles have been repossessed. A "reinstatement" entails a consumer paying all of their past due amounts plus the creditor's repossession expenses, and then reacquiring the automobile as if the repossession had not occurred. A "redemption" entails the consumer paying off the entire contract balance and then being given ownership of the vehicle free and clear of any contract obligations. If these instances do not occur and the vehicle becomes repossessed, the lien holder is required to notify the debtor of their intent to sell the property. This is usually in the form of a letter that states that if the amount owed is not paid within ten business days, the entity officially takes ownership and may sell the property.

Some consumers believe that they are legally entitled to a "grace period" that prevents creditors from repossessing goods until the payments are a certain number of days overdue. In reality, grace periods are non-compulsory business practices that have been adopted by most consumer lenders through a term in the lending contract. There is nothing legally preventing a creditor with a security interest from repossessing the goods if a payment is late - even if it is only one day overdue - unless the lender has agreed otherwise as a binding term of contract.

Various objects can be repossessed, including boats and aircraft, but most repossession agencies focus on car repossession. The repo agent normally uses a tow truck or pickup truck with a special towing attachment called a boom. They also may obtain the key from the car owner. Usually, the vehicle owner must be notified of a repossession. The repossession agent will find the car and check its information such as the vehicle identification number (VIN) to make sure they have the right vehicle. If there is a match, they will attempt to hook up the car to the tow truck and tow it away or pick the lock and drive it away. However doing so does not absolve the repossession agent's requirement to be covered under an active insurance policy for the vehicle under the applicable criminal traffic laws. Thus, an agent who elects to do this may be subject to arrest for the violation of criminal traffic laws which apply to insurance requirements. Repossession agents cannot legally cross locked and enclosed storage spaces such as gates and garages. They also may not move a vehicle to gain access to another vehicle.

Repossession does not necessarily satisfy the loan. If the repossessor sells the asset for an appropriate amount, and if that amount is less than the amount of the loan, and if the repossessor sues the debtor for the balance (plus reasonable fees if applicable) in a timely manner, the debtor may be liable to pay the balance (sometimes called the "deficiency"). In this case the creditor will be liable for contributory negligence if the creditor auctions the property for less than applicable fair market value. This is because such a failure directly contributes to any remaining deficiency. To avoid this liability, financial institutions will document a source (such as Kelley Blue Book or NADA) to price the collateral for sale. They will also document the condition of the vehicle to justify the sales price of it.

Whether a debtor is actually liable for a balance depends on jurisdiction and on the details of the loan contract. In the case of a nonrecourse debt, for example, the debtor is not personally liable for a deficiency.

== United Kingdom ==
Repossession is possible with real estate, commercial and domestic properties.

=== England and Wales ===
These numbers and text relate to home mortgage repossessions in England.

Number of repossessions in England

Year	Claims Issued	Claims Leading To An Order	Properties Taken Into Possession
1990	145,350	103,508	43,900
1991	186,649	142,905	75,500
1992	142,163	126,881	68,600
1993	116,181	105,283	58,600
1994	87,958	77,681	49,200
1995	84,170	75,258	49,400
1996	79,858	71,203	42,600
1997	67,073	57,156	32,800
1998	84,836	66,055	33,900
1999	77,818	53,448	29,200
2000	70,140	48,403	22,900
2001	65,555	45,812	18,200
2002	62,862	40,430	12,000
2003	65,373	39,784	8,500
2004	76,993	45,356	8,200
2005	114,733	68,922	14,500
2006	131,248	88,018	21,000
2007	137,725	90,654	25,900
2008	142,741	111,763	40,000
2009	N/A	N/A	48,000

In 2010, there was a downward trend in the number of repossessions, as lenders seized 9,400 properties in April, May and June, 400 fewer than in the first quarter of 2010, according to the Council of Mortgage Lenders (CML).

== Germany ==
Repossession by self-help is generally illegal and constitutes theft. In most cases, if the debtor is unable or unwilling to pay an outstanding debt, the creditor must first obtain either a court order authorizing the repossession (Vollstreckungsbescheid, only possible if the debtor does not contest the debt) or a regular court judgment. The debt must then be collected by an officer of the court (Gerichtsvollzieher) who exclusively may use force to collect the debt, such as opening a door or enlisting help from police. Neither the creditor nor private debt collection agencies may use force or seize property against the will of the debtor.

Specific forms of self-help repossession for real estate are legal. For example, a landlord may seize the tenant's property in a rented object if there are outstanding payments.

== Italy ==
In Italy, repossession is possible only if an executive order by a court is issued and must be performed by a special public official only (ufficiale giudiziario). Repossession by self-help is in general illegal and constitutes theft. Repossession by self-help of a stolen property is legal only if made by the owner of the property and without using any force against objects or people.

== See also ==
- Detinue – Legal action to recover for the wrongful taking of personal property
- Distraint – Seizure of property to obtain payments
- Foreclosure – Legal process where a lender recoups an unpaid loan
- Lien – Security on property or debt
- Replevin – Ancient common law remedy
