= Marketable title =

Real estate title free enough from defect that a court will compel its acceptance

Marketable title is a concept in real estate law referring to a title to real property that is sufficiently free from defect that a court of equity will legally compel its acceptance by a buyer in a specific performance action. Marketable title does not require the absolute absence of any defect, but rather a title that a prudent, well-informed buyer would accept in the ordinary course of a real estate transaction without objection.

The terms merchantable title and clear title are used synonymously with marketable title in most jurisdictions. For real estate practitioners, the most authoritative reference to title requirements in a given transaction is the preprinted language of the purchase and sale contract, which typically specifies the standard of title the seller is required to deliver at closing.

== Legal standard ==
A marketable title is one that:

- Is held by the seller in fee simple absolute or another agreed estate
- Is free from reasonable doubt as to its validity
- Is free from liens, encumbrances, and competing claims that would expose the buyer to litigation
- Can be transferred without the buyer assuming an unreasonable risk of defending ownership against third parties

The standard is objective — it asks whether a reasonable, prudent buyer with knowledge of the relevant facts would accept the title, not whether a particular buyer subjectively finds it satisfactory. A buyer who refuses a title that meets the marketable title standard may be in breach of contract and exposed to a specific performance action by the seller.

== Implied covenant of marketable title ==
In the absence of an express agreement to the contrary, a contract for the sale of real property contains an implied covenant that the seller will deliver marketable title at closing. This implied undertaking arises by operation of law and does not need to be stated explicitly in the contract.

Where a seller fails to deliver marketable title, the buyer's typical remedies include:

- Rescission — cancellation of the contract and recovery of any earnest money deposit paid
- Damages — compensation for costs incurred in reliance on the contract, such as inspection, survey, and legal fees
- Specific performance with abatement — in some jurisdictions, a court may compel the sale while reducing the purchase price to account for the title defect

The contract may also expressly define the consequences of a title failure, superseding the default implied covenant remedies.

== Closing date rule ==
Sellers are required to tender marketable title only as of the date of closing — the date on which the deed is executed and delivered. A seller need not hold marketable title at the time the contract is signed. This rule permits sellers to contract to sell property encumbered by a mortgage or lien, provided the encumbrance is discharged from sale proceeds before or at closing.

Liability for breach of the marketable title obligation attaches only if the seller fails to cure the defect by the closing date. Courts have generally held that a seller who cures all title defects prior to or at closing has satisfied the obligation, even if defects existed earlier in the contract period.

== Merger doctrine ==
Once a deed is delivered and accepted by the buyer at closing, the deed supersedes and extinguishes the purchase contract through the merger doctrine. Any title warranties or obligations that existed in the contract but were not carried forward into the deed are merged into the deed and cannot be separately enforced after closing.

Consequently, if a deed is delivered without a warranty of title — such as a quitclaim deed — the buyer has no post-closing recourse for title defects under the contract. The buyer's only title protections after closing are those contained in the deed covenants themselves and, where obtained, a title insurance policy.

== Defects that render title unmarketable ==
The following title conditions are generally held to render title unmarketable:

1. Outstanding mortgages or liens against the property not dischargeable at closing
2. Restrictive covenants that materially limit the use or enjoyment of the property
3. Outstanding future interests held by third parties, such as a possibility of reverter or a right of re-entry
4. Encumbrances that reduce the property's value or interfere with the buyer's intended use
5. Easements burdening the property not disclosed in the contract, particularly those that materially impair use
6. Variations in the names of grantors or grantees in the chain of title that create ambiguity as to identity
7. Breaks or gaps in the chain of title that cannot be resolved by record evidence
8. Outstanding dower or curtesy interests of a spouse not joined in the conveyance
9. Unresolved adverse possession claims by third parties
10. Structural encroachments of improvements onto neighboring property or public rights-of-way
11. Existing violations of an equitable servitude, covenant, or deed restriction
12. Existing violations of zoning ordinances or building codes that have resulted in enforcement proceedings

== Conditions that do not defeat marketability ==
Certain conditions encumber title without rendering it unmarketable:

1. Zoning restrictions and land use regulations, provided no current violation exists and the buyer's intended use is permitted
2. Other governmental regulations applicable to the property by operation of law (e.g., environmental regulations, subdivision requirements)
3. Easements that are visible, of record, and disclosed in the contract, where the buyer had the opportunity to object prior to execution
4. Nominal encumbrances that do not materially impair use or value and would be accepted by any reasonable buyer

== Marketable title acts ==
Many U.S. states have enacted Marketable Title Acts (MTAs) — statutes that extinguish certain old title claims and encumbrances that have not been re-recorded within a specified period, typically 30 to 40 years. MTAs are designed to simplify title searches by eliminating the need to examine records beyond the statutory lookback period for most types of claims.

Under a marketable title act, a person with an unbroken chain of title of record for the statutory period holds marketable title against claims arising before the root of title, subject to specific exceptions for interests preserved by re-recording. States with marketable title acts include Florida, Michigan, Ohio, Minnesota, and Iowa, among others.

== Relationship to title insurance ==
Title insurance is the primary commercial mechanism by which buyers and lenders protect against residual title defects that survive a title examination. A title insurance policy does not cure defects in marketable title but insures the insured against financial loss caused by covered defects, including defects that a title search failed to reveal.

The existence of a title insurance commitment does not satisfy the seller's contractual obligation to deliver marketable title. A buyer is entitled to both marketable title and title insurance where the contract requires both; one does not substitute for the other.

== See also ==
- Clear title
- Chain of title
- Title insurance
- Deed
- Encumbrance
- Warranty deed
- Quitclaim deed
- Specific performance
- Merger doctrine (property law)
- Easement
- Adverse possession
