= Cloud on title =

Concept in United States property law

In United States property law, a cloud on title or title defect is any irregularity in the chain of title of property (usually real property) that would give a reasonable person pause before accepting a conveyance of title. According to Investopedia, a cloud can be defined as: "Any document, claim, unreleased lien or encumbrance that might invalidate or impair the title to real property or make the title doubtful. Clouds on title are usually discovered during a title search." Clouded title can thus be contrasted with a clear title, which indicates that a property is unencumbered.

A cloud on title may reduce the value and marketability of property because any prospective buyer aware of the cloud will know that they are buying the risk the grantor may not be able to convey good title. Often, the discovery of a cloud on title will provide the grantee a reason to back out of a contract for the sale of real property. Some documents that affect title may be considered clouds, but nonetheless are unlikely to affect marketability or resale, such as with covenants, conditions and restrictions in a homeowners' association or subdivision.

Examples of clouds on title include a property's address being misspelled in a deed conveying title, a mortgage lien whose repayment hasn't been officially recorded, a deed which has been signed but hasn't been properly recorded, an easement that has not been properly recorded, unpaid property taxes, a failure to transfer property rights (such as mineral rights) to a former owner of the property, and a pending lawsuit before a court of law over ownership to the property. The usual remedy for a cloud on title is to file a civil action to quiet title which resolves the outstanding or unresolved cloud.

Clouded title can cause delays or denials in receiving certain forms of disaster recovery aid, especially longer-term rebuilding assistance. This can be a more serious problem for low-income families who over time might not have been able to afford lawyers and legal fees for probate, and who can face even worse financial problems in the wake of a disaster. This has led some states to make available low-cost mechanisms to transfer title.

== Foreclosure ==
A cloud on titIe can be caused by foreclosure of a property. For instance, if a current title holder of a property does not pay the mortgage on that property, foreclosure would occur. When a property goes into foreclosure, the mortgage company becomes the owner of the property making it challenging for the current resident to sell the property. To remove the cloud on the title being caused by foreclosure, the resident would simply need to pay what is owed on their mortgage. This would remove the cloud on the title.

== Probate ==
Probate is a process that occurs when a court oversees the distribution of a deceased individual's assets. Probate will sometimes cause a cloud on the title of property if an heir is not specified. To remove the cloud on title in this situation, the court will go through a process of notifying the deceased person's beneficiaries and making a decision on who will become the executor of the estate. This person will then be responsible for having the property appraised and listed.

== Clerical Error ==
A cloud on title can be created by something as simple as a clerical error in the legal documents. An example would be a misspelling on a document or a document not being filed correctly. These types of errors can usually be resolved by filing a quitclaim deed. Quitclaim deeds should only be used for minor issues that cause a cloud on title due to their limited guarantees.

== See also ==
- Bare trust
- Continuando
- Title insurance
- Quitclaim deed
