= Stewart Title of Austin, LLC =

Land Title insurance company in Texas, USA

- Company type: Public company (NYSE: STC)
- Founded: Travis County, Texas, USA (1873)
- Headquarters: 901 S. MoPac, Bldg. III, Ste. 100, Austin, Texas, USA
- Key people: Tony Evans, Division Vice President Gaye Pierce, Chief Operations Officer, Executive Vice President Larry Molinare, Executive Vice President
- Services: Title Insurance; Specialty Insurance
- Website: http://www.stewart.com/austin

Originally founded as Gracy Title Company in Austin, Texas in 1873, it was the first and oldest land title insurance company in Texas.

== History ==
Our company's original land title plant and document history date back to the sovereignty of Texas as a territory when the King of Spain granted land to the original settlers of Texas prior to its period as a Republic from 1836 to 1845. During the Reconstruction Era of the United States following the Civil War, the abstract and land title industry was in disarray regarding valid ownership of land and real estate claims, which gave rise to need for land & real estate contract negotiations, procedures and transactions to be insured. The general title insurance concept had previously been conceived but was not a fully legal industry within land transactions. A Pennsylvania dispute that arose in 1868, which eventually settled in 1873, led to the legal incorporation of U.S. title insurance companies, in The General Corporation Act passed in 1874. The first company in Texas which arose out of the merging concepts of abstract, title and insurance, Gracy was founded from an existing abstract of title company, as James V. Bergen and Company in 1873 by surveyor James Valentine Bergen and George B. Zimpelman, a former Travis County Texas sheriff, land developer and owner of LBJ Ranch. As Zimpelman's business influence in Texas development increased, he was given partnership, and the firm was renamed Zimpelman & Bergen. David Bergen Gracy, James Bergen's cousin, joined the firm in 1881. When Zimpelman retired, the name changed to Bergen Daniel & Gracy Abstract Company (headed by James Bergen, David Bergen Gracy, and Charles Daniel at 103 E. 6th Street). The Austin Board of Trade referred to the firm as "the only institution here that furnishes reliable abstract of title in the county." The office later moved to 819 Congress Ave. David Gracy served as Austin's city treasurer, city commissioner, and assisted in the organization of several prominent deposit & loan and mortgage companies in Austin. The company became Gracy Title Guaranty Company in 1920 and was owned and operated by the Gracy family until 1947.

== Title & Escrow Services ==
When operating as Gracy Title, a subsidiary of parent company, Stewart Law and Land Title Company since 2008, the company was collectively recognized by Forbes as the nation's 4th most admirable and trustworthy company. In July 2017, Gracy Title, a Stewart Company was officially renamed to Stewart Title of Austin. The company issues title insurance policies and provides title services from 12 locations throughout Central Texas. Outside of the Austin market, prior to the Stewart merger with Gracy, Stewart's history dates back to 1893, originating in Galveston, Texas.

Stewart Title of Austin issues title insurance policies on three of the largest underwriters in the US: First American Title, Commonwealth Land Title Insurance Company and Stewart Title Guaranty Company. The company provides title and escrow services, post-closing services, and insurance services for commercial and residential transactions.

== See also ==
List of United States insurance companies
