= Title opinion =

A title opinion is the written opinion of an attorney, based on the attorney's title search into a property, describing the current ownership rights in the property, as well as the actions that must be taken to make the stated ownership rights marketable.

In the oil and gas sector, various types of title opinions exist, each with a different scope and purpose. These include, but are not limited to, drilling title opinions, division order title opinions, mortgage opinions, acquisition opinions, and drilling and division order title opinions.

== See also ==
- Chain of title
- Title (property)
