= LandAmerica Financial Group =

Third largest title insurance group in the US

- Company type: Public
- Industry: Real estate
- Founded: 1876 (The Real Estate Title Insurance Company of Philadelphia)
- Headquarters: Glen Allen, Virginia, United States
- Key people: Thomas G. Snead Jr. - Chairman of the Board
- Products: Formerly Land Titles, Title insurance
- Revenue: $4.2 Billion USD (2006)
- Net income: ▲$165.6 Million USD (2005)
- Website: www.landam.com

LandAmerica Financial Group, Inc. was the third largest title insurance group in the US. It was incorporated in 1991 as Lawyers Title Corporation, and renamed LandAmerica after Lawyers Title acquired Commonwealth Land Title Insurance Company and Transnation Title Insurance Company in 1998. It was headquartered in Glen Allen, Virginia. The company's subsidiaries were primarily title insurers; however, they offered a number of other real estate transaction services.

Through its subsidiaries, principally Commonwealth Land Title Insurance Company and Lawyers Title Insurance Corporation (its third largest subsidiary, Transnation Title Insurance Company, was merged into Lawyers Title in 2008) LandAmerica principally engaged in the title insurance business in the United States. Its products and services facilitated the purchase, sale, transfer, and financing of residential and commercial real estate.

The company operated primarily in three segments: Title Insurance, Lender Services, and Financial Services.

The Title Insurance segment provided title insurance, escrow and closing services, commercial real estate services, property appraisal and valuation, building and site assessments, survey coordination, construction disbursement, coordination of national multistate transactions, tax-deferred real property exchanges, and real estate transaction management services.

The Lender Services segment provided services to regional and national lending institutions, which complemented those offered in the company’s title insurance business. These services consisted primarily of real estate tax processing, flood certification services, mortgage credit reporting, default management services, and mortgage loan subservicing.

The Financial Services segment engaged in originating and purchasing of commercial real estate loans in the southern California market, as well as soliciting deposits through certificates of deposit and passbook savings accounts.

The company provided its services to lenders, developers, real estate agents, attorneys, and property buyers and sellers. It served residential and commercial customers with approximately 1,000 offices and a network of over 10,000 agents throughout the United States, Mexico, Canada, the Caribbean, Latin America, and Europe.

== Bankruptcy ==
On November 26, 2008, LandAmerica filed for Chapter 11 bankruptcy protection. LandAmerica's largest competitor, Fidelity National Financial, previously proposed a merger on November 8, 2008, following LandAmerica's posting multibillion-dollar losses in the third quarter. That deal fell apart following due diligence. Instead, Fidelity has acquired several LandAmerica units: Lawyers Title Insurance Corp., Commonwealth Land Title Insurance Co., and United Capital Title Insurance Co.

LandAmerica sold the subsidiary, LandAmerica Assessment Corporation (LAC), to Partner Engineering and Science, Inc. (Partner) in March 2009. Partner is continuing to service the old LAC reports and is continuing to do business under the name "LandAmerica Assessment" until July 2009.
