= Clear title =

Real estate terminology

Clear title is the phrase used to state that the owner of real property owns it free and clear of encumbrances. In a more limited sense, it is used to state that, although the owner does not own clear title, it is nevertheless within the power of the owner to convey clear title. For example, a property may be encumbered by a mortgage. This encumbrance means that no one has clear title to the property. However, standard terms in a mortgage require the mortgage holder to release the mortgage if a certain amount of money is paid. Therefore, a buyer with enough money to satisfy both the mortgage and the current owner can get clear title.

According to Investopedia: "A clear title is a title without any kind of lien or levy from creditors or other parties and poses no question as to legal ownership. For example, an owner of a car with a clear title is the sole undisputed owner, and no other party can make any kind of legal claim to its ownership."

A title search is typically conducted by a title company or real estate attorney prior to closing to verify that the seller holds clear title and to identify any outstanding liens, easements, or judgments that may affect ownership. If defects are found during the search, the seller is generally required to resolve them before the transaction can proceed, ensuring the buyer receives marketable title at closing. Title insurance is commonly purchased by buyers and lenders to provide financial protection against any undiscovered claims or defects that may surface after the property has changed hands.

== See also ==
- Cloud on title
- Title insurance
- Title search
