= Property abstract =

Legal term

Property abstract (also called an abstract of title or title abstract) is a summary of the legal documents that chronicle transactions associated with a particular parcel of land. Generally included are references to deeds, mortgages, wills, probate records, court litigations, and tax sales—basically, any legal document that affects the property.

The abstract will show the names of all property owners, how long a particular holder owned it, and the price of the land when it was sold. Rarely will an abstract mention capital improvements to the property.

== Abstract of title ==
An abstract of title is the condensed history of the title to a particular parcel of real estate, consisting of a summary of the original grant and all subsequent conveyances and encumbrances affecting the property and a certification by the abstractor that the history is complete and accurate. In the United States, the abstract of title furnishes the raw data for the preparation of a policy of title insurance for the parcel of land in question. In Iowa, commercial title insurance is outlawed, so title insurance policies are issued by Iowa Title Guaranty, an Iowa state government agency.

An abstract of title should be distinguished from an opinion of title. While an abstract states that all of the public record documents concerning the property in question are contained therein, an opinion states the professional judgment of the person giving the opinion as to the vesting of the title and other matters concerning the chain of title. Many jurisdictions define the giving of an opinion of title as the practice of law, thus making it unlawful for a non-attorney to provide such an opinion.

== See also ==
- Chain of title
- Conveyancing
- Land registration
- Title insurance
- Real property
