= Local search =

Local search may refer to:

- Local search (constraint satisfaction), a method for problem solving in constraint satisfaction
- Local search (Internet), web searching for web sites relevant to a given place
- Local search (optimization), a method for problem solving in optimization
- Local authority search, in the UK a search for information about a particular property and the surrounding area undertaken as part of conveyancing
