= Conveyancing =

Transfer of legal title of property

In law, conveyancing is the transfer of legal title of real property from one person to another, or the granting of an encumbrance such as a mortgage or a lien. A typical conveyancing transaction has two major phases: the exchange of contracts (when equitable interests are created) and completion (also called settlement, when legal title passes and equitable rights merge with the legal title). The electronic execution of conveyancing processes and documents is known as e-conveyancing.

The sale of land is governed by the laws and practices of the jurisdiction in which the land is located. It is a legal requirement in all jurisdictions that contracts for the sale of land be in writing. An exchange of contracts involves two copies of a contract of sale being signed, one copy of which is retained by each party. When the parties are together, both would usually sign both copies, one copy of which being retained by each party, sometimes with a formal handing over of a copy from one party to the other. However, it is usually sufficient that only the copy retained by each party be signed by the other party only – hence contracts are "exchanged". This rule enables contracts to be "exchanged" by mail. Both copies of the contract of sale become binding only after each party is in possession of a copy of the contract signed by the other party – i.e., the exchange is said to be "complete". An exchange by electronic means is generally insufficient for an exchange, unless the laws of the jurisdiction expressly validate such signatures.

It is the responsibility of the buyer of real property to ensure that they obtain a good and marketable title to the land – i.e., that the seller is the owner, has the right to sell the property, and there is no factor which would impede a mortgage or re-sale. Some jurisdictions have legislated some protections for the buyer, besides the ability for the buyer to do searches relating to the property.

A system of conveyancing is usually designed to ensure that the buyer secures title to the land together with all the rights that run with the land, and is notified of any restrictions in advance of purchase. Many jurisdictions have adopted a system of land registration to facilitate conveyancing and encourage reliance on public records and assure purchasers of land that they are taking good title.

== Public record ==
In the Roman tradition, private rights to land were enforceable even if secret; this tradition remained to some extent in Europe up through the 19th century, but modern systems no longer allow for such secrecy. In many civil law countries, the real estate transfers are usually supervised by notaries who, after a due diligence verification, execute the deed of sale and send it to the Public Registers. The involvement of civil law notaries, qualified legal experts delegated by the State (they must have a University Degree in Law), represents – besides an assistance for the involved parties in the property transfer process – also a gate keeping for the soundness of the economic system and the protection of vulnerable parties.

== England and Wales ==
In England and Wales, conveyancing is usually done by a solicitor or a licensed conveyancer; either may employ or supervise an unqualified conveyancer. What is being conveyed, or transferred, is a piece of land or property, that historically (especially in England) may or may not include the "messuage", that would be the principal dwelling, and might include an orchard, any outbuildings, and curtilage if present. The domestic conveyancing market is price competitive, with a high number of firms of solicitors and conveyancing companies offering a similar service. It is possible for someone to carry out their own conveyancing, but it is labour-intensive. If the transaction involves a mortgage, it is almost certain that the lender will insist that a solicitor is used for the conveyancing.

It is a common myth that conveyancing has to be carried out by a local solicitor or conveyancer. This is no longer the case, with many conveyancers and solicitors conducting transactions from a distance using email and online technology. However, the Law Society warns solicitors to be wary of clients instructing their firm with no geographic connection to them for risk of money laundering.

There were approximately 5,357 firms operating in the conveyancing market in 2015, but this number has fallen from 5,871 the year before. The number of firms in the market is almost a third lower than the 7,779 firms recording transactions in 2005, following a severe conveyancing shortage during the recession.

Under English law, agreements are not legally binding until contracts are exchanged. This affords both the advantage of freedom before contract, but also the disadvantage of wasted time and expense in the event the deal is not done. The Law Commission recognised in 2018 that electronic exchange of documents and electronic signatures are legally valid in relation to land transactions.

The normal practice is for the buyer to negotiate an agreed price with the seller then organise a survey and have the solicitor (or conveyancer) carry out their searches and pre-contract enquiries. The seller's solicitor or conveyancer will prepare the draft contract to be approved by the buyer's solicitor. The seller's solicitor will also collect and prepare property information to be provided to the buyer's solicitors, in line with the Law Society's National Protocol for domestic conveyancing. When undertaking property transactions, the conveyancer's role is to carry out due diligence by submitting queries – known as conveyancing searches – about the transacted property. These are designed to uncover factors the estate agent or surveyor may not know about, which could impact the buyer's enjoyment of the property.

It takes on average 10–12 weeks to complete a conveyancing transaction, but while some transactions are quicker, many take longer. The timescale is determined by a host of factors – legal, personal, social and financial. During this period prior to exchange of contracts (exchange being the point at which the transaction becomes legally binding) either party can pull out of the transaction at any time and for any reason, with no legal obligation to the other. This gives rise to a risk of gazumping and its converse, gazundering. Conveyancing is a component of the cost of moving house in the United Kingdom.

=== Conveyancing searches ===
The conveyancer’s role is to carry out due diligence by submitting queries – known as searches – about the transacted property. These are designed to uncover factors that the estate agent or surveyor may not know about, which could impact the buyer’s enjoyment of the property. Conveyancing searches include:

- Land Registry search – to confirm ownership and boundaries by checking the ‘title register’ and ‘title plan’.
- Local authority search – to reveal any charges or restrictions of use on the property.
- Water authority search – to find out if any public drains on the property might affect extensions or building works.
- Flood risk search – to discover potential hazards from coastal, river or surface water flooding.
- Chancel repair liability search – to ensure there are no potential leftover medieval liabilities on the property to help pay for church repairs.
- Environmental search – to provide information about contaminated land, landfill sites, former and current industry, radon gas hazard, ground stability issues, and other related information at or around the property.
- Optional and location specific searches – sometimes extra searches are required or recommended depending on the location or type of property or due to particular concerns raised by the buyer. These could include:
  - Tin mining searches in Cornwall.
  - Mining searches in various parts of the UK.
  - Cheshire brine searches.
  - Additional local authority searches for potential issues such as: Pipelines, noise abatement zones, common land, etc.

=== Search providers ===
Local authority searches, according to the Law Society, are a ‘vital part of the conveyancing process and give buyers important information about matters affecting a property that is registered or recorded with the local authority. However, over the years, delays with local authority searches have prompted lawyers to order a ‘personal’ search, carried out by a third party or a search provider, who visits the council office and inspects and records the information kept by the local authority on behalf of the conveyancer or solicitor.

Private search companies and ordering platforms have been integrating Land Registry's data to speed up the process of search ordering, improve accuracy and reduce the chances of human error. One example is the use of Land Registry's National Spatial Dataset to display boundary maps on-screen using a live data link to help validate property locations.

== Scotland ==
In Scots law, conveyancing is carried out as a second stage in the voluntary transfer of land after the completion of the contractual stage. The position in Scotland under Scots law is that the contract is generally concluded at a much earlier stage than in the English & Welsh and common law jurisdictions. The contractual stage of the transfer is called the missives of sale between the buyer, or buyer's agent, and seller, or seller's agent. Missives are letters the body of which contain the contract of sale is formed. Once all the contractual terms are agreed, the missives are said to be concluded, and these serve as a binding contract for the sale of the property. Normally the contract is conditional upon matters such as the sellers being able, before completion of the transaction, to prove that they have good title to the property and to exhibit clear searches from the land registers and the local authority.

From 1 December 2008 properties for sale are marketed with a 'Home Information Report. This consists of: a Single Survey, an Energy Report and a Property Questionnaire. The Home Report is available on request to prospective buyers of the property. The date of final settlement is in Scotland known as the "date of entry", the date on which the Buyer is able to take possession of the property. The transfer of ownership itself only completes after the completion of the registration of the disposition document in the Land Register of Scotland.

Solicitors, advocates and licensed conveyancing practitioners are the only individuals legally permitted to conduct conveyancing for a fee in Scotland, and as such enjoy a conveyancing monopoly, under the Solicitors (Scotland) Act 1980 section 32 which creates a criminal offence for any unlicensed person preparing conveyancing documents in the expectation of a fee. Having said that, there is no legal requirement in Scotland to use the services of a solicitor, advocate or licensed conveyancing practitioner to transfer property ownership/land title. A willing buyer and seller can submit all the necessary completed documents to the Land Register of Scotland themselves.

== Australia ==
Most privately owned land in Australia is now regulated under the Torrens system of land registration, introduced between 1857 and 1875. Some parcels of land are still unregistered and commonly referred to as general law land. Property law in Australia is derived from English common law.

Conveyancing in Australia (also called a transfer) is usually carried out by a solicitor or a licensed conveyancer. Kits are available for the buyer to complete the process themselves, but due to the complexity of varying state and council laws and processes, this is usually not recommended.

Queensland and New South Wales have a 5 days "cooling off" period for residential contracts. Victoria has a 3 business day coooling off period on private sales and South Australia has 2 days. During this time the purchaser may reconsider the purchase and, if they so wish, cancel the contract, in which case the purchaser may be legally bound to pay 0.25% of the purchasing price to the seller (0.2% in Victoria). Not all contracts have a cooling off period such as when the property is purchased at auction or if the purchaser expedites the process.

A common conveyance by a solicitor or a licensed conveyancer usually takes 4 to 6 weeks. Most firms offer fixed price services which normally include costs for searches, legal advice and other outlays. In most states and territories a typical conveyance includes, but is not limited to, the following:

- checking for encumbrances and restrictions on the property
- ensuring special conditions mentioned in the contract are met
- making sure rates, land tax and water consumption charges are paid by the appropriate party
- arranging for the payment of fees and charges and government duties
- preparation of legal documents
- for the purchaser, liaising with the financiers of the purchaser to satisfy their requirements before settlement
- for the vendor, liaising with the financiers of the vendor to arrange settlement and obtain discharge of mortgages on the title
- arranging and attending final settlement.

Searches tend to take up the bulk of the conveyance. Due to the three level system of government (federal, state and local), it must be made sure that the vendor is entitled to all rights and title. Most information is retrieved from state or local (council) authorities. Conveyancing processes, legal documentation, contract requirements, and search requirements vary between each state and territory.

Requirements, searches and costs can vary between jurisdictions, depending on local property legislation and regulations. Depending on the circumstances of each case, and depending on the jurisdiction, a title search may also involve:

- registered plan search or building units/group titles plan search
- company search
- contaminated land search
- council property search
- full council inspection of records search
- land tax search
- main roads search.

With the introduction of the Electronic Conveyancing National Law in 2012, all Australian states are in the process of transitioning to electronic conveyancing in accordance with state-based mandates.

== United States ==
The conveyancing process in the United States varies from state to state depending on local legal requirements and historical practice. In rare situations, the parties will engage in a formal "closing". In a formal closing, three attorneys will be involved in the process: one each to represent the buyer, seller, and mortgage holder; frequently all three will sit around a table with the buyer and seller and literally "pass papers" to effect the transaction.

Much more commonly, the transaction is closed by use of an escrow. (See also Escrow § Real estate.) Practice varies from state to state as to who conducts the title search to make sure the seller has or can convey clear title, including what liens must be paid, and as to who acts as the escrow holder. In many states, attorneys still act as the escrow agent and title inspector. In many others, those functions are conducted by licensed escrow agents who often are affiliated with or even employed by a title insurance company. Some use a mix, such as having an attorney conduct the escrow while the title investigation is handled by the title insurance company or its agent.

In order to protect themselves from defects in the title, buyers will frequently purchase title insurance at this time for themselves. They will almost always be required to purchase title insurance for their lender as a condition of the loan.

In most states, a prospective buyer's offer to purchase is made in the form of a written contract and bound with a deposit on the purchase price. The offer will set out conditions (such as appraisal, title clearance, inspection, occupancy, and financing) under which the buyer may withdraw the offer without forfeiting the deposit. Once the conditions have been met (or waived), the buyer has "equitable title" and conveyancing proceeds or may be compelled by court order. There may be other last-minute conditions to closing, such as "broom clean" premises, evictions, and repairs.

Typical papers at a conveyancing include: deed(s), certified checks, promissory note, mortgage, certificate of liens, pro rata property taxes, title insurance binder, and fire insurance binder. There may also be side agreements (e.g., holdover tenants, delivery contracts, payment holdback for unacceptable repairs), seller's right of first refusal for resale, declaration of trust, or other entity formation or consolidation (incorporation, limited partnership investors, etc.). Where "time is of the essence", there have been cases where the entire deposit is forfeited (as liquidated damages) if the conveyancing is delayed beyond the time limits of the buyer's contingencies, even if the purchase is completed.

Words used to indicate conveyance, or words of conveyance include grant, devise, give, and sell.

== See also ==
- List of real estate topics
- Real estate appraisal
- Transfer of equity
- Verification and validation
