= Tax sale =

Forced sale of property to pay unpaid taxes

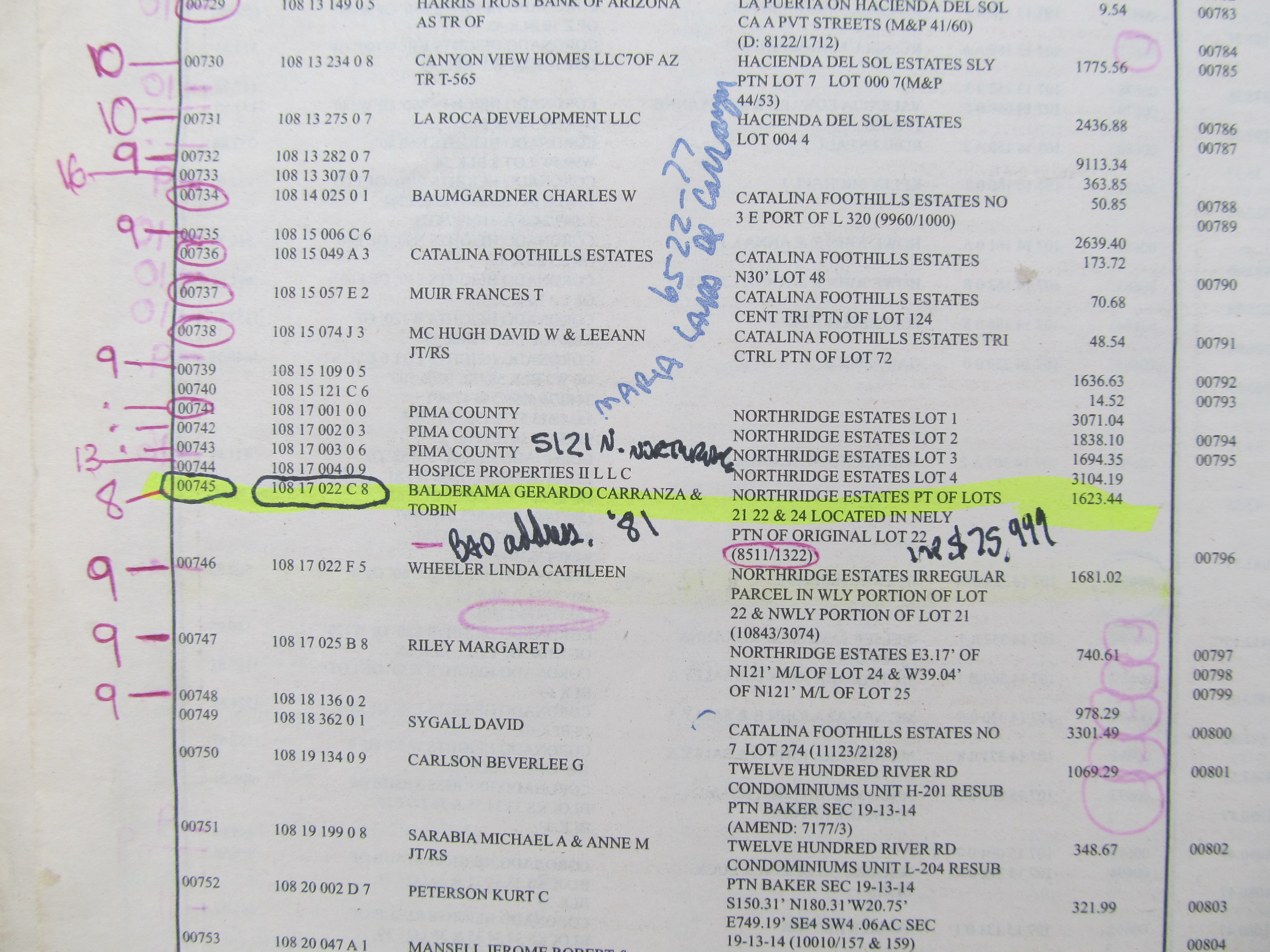
Pima County, Arizona delinquent property tax list for auction by the County Treasurer

A tax sale is the forced sale of property (usually real estate) by a governmental entity for unpaid taxes by the property's owner.

The sale, depending on the jurisdiction, may be a tax deed sale (whereby the actual property is sold) or a tax lien sale (whereby a lien on the property is sold) Under the tax lien sale process, depending on the jurisdiction, after a specified period of time if the lien is not redeemed, the lienholder may seek legal action which will result in the lienholder either automatically obtaining the property, or forcing a future tax deed sale of the property and possibly obtaining the property as a result.

== General ==
The governmental entity can be any level of government that can assess and collect property taxes or other governmental debt, such as counties (parishes, in the case of Louisiana), cities, townships (in New England and other jurisdictions), and school districts (in places where they are independent of other governmental jurisdictions, such as in Texas).

State law offers the governmental entity a method of collecting its tax on the property without financially binding the nonpaying person or business, by placing a lien on the property which, if not paid, will result in future cost during a specified grace period wherein, to recover the property, the owner can be charged interest and/or penalties as well as other costs; and if completely non-paid, ultimately the seizure and selling of the property. In most places in the US, a tax lien takes priority, eclipsing other liens such as mortgages.

The requirements to begin the foreclosure process (and to avoid it) must be strictly followed; otherwise, the property owner will lose all rights to the property (or the governmental entity will lose its right to collect the outstanding debt). Common requirements include:

- sending a letter by certified or registered mail to any and all owners of record as shown on the entity's records (some jurisdictions require an attempt at personal service), as well as to any person shown as having a mortgage, lien, or "other interest" in the property,
- placing a public notice in a newspaper designated to publish legal notices,
- posting notice at the local courthouse or other public place designated for official notices, and/or
- posting notice on the property itself in such a place and manner that it is visible to the public (such as the outside of an exterior door, or a sign on the property if it is unimproved).

Once the process begins, the property owner can still avoid foreclosure by paying the amount owed plus interest, penalties, and/or other costs or fees. The amounts can end up being quite high if the process is well under way. Even after foreclosure, in some jurisdictions the owner can still recover the property by paying the amounts owed (plus additional interest/penalties/costs) within a specified time. Alternatively, the owner can file suit to have the sale set aside on grounds that the requirements were not followed (such as proper notice not given).

== Sales ==
Two main methods are used to capture delinquent real property tax: the tax deed sale and the tax lien sale.

Both methods operate using an auction method. The title, not the property is up for auction at a tax lien or deed sale, the property may or may not be salable. Traditionally, the auctions have been live events held at the county courthouse or another designated official location. However, online auctions have increased in usage. There are various auction bidding methods used to determine final sale, the method and the terms of sale vary by county for each county in every state. Each county will advertise that no tax sale is risk-free since all title and certificates on property are sold 'as is' with no warranties, and no expectation of clear title.

=== Tax deed sale ===
In a tax deed sale, the title to each property is sold.

At the sale, the minimum bid is generally the amount of back taxes owed plus interest, as well as costs associated with selling the property. Often the purchaser making the highest bid for the property takes title. However, the purchaser must follow each county's rules, which vary widely, and usually have a very short period (generally 48–72 hours, or much less) to pay the entire amount owed, or else the sale is invalidated and usually the auction deposit is lost.

Depending on the jurisdiction, any amount in excess of the minimum bid may or may not be returned to the original property title owner, or the owner may forfeit rights to such excess amount if not claimed within a specified period. Also, anyone having an interest in the property (such as a governmental entity having weed liens on the property) may, in some cases, claim the excess.

In the event the property is not purchased at auction, title generally reverts to the governmental entity that initiated the sale, which can then offer it for at or even below the original minimum bid (depending on property value and/or interest in the parcel).

Title is generally transferred in a tax deed sale through a form of limited warranty or quitclaim deed (sometimes styled as Tax Deed or Sheriff's Deed). In most jurisdictions, this type of deed is generally insufficient to acquire title insurance. Therefore, a purchaser would most likely then need to initiate a quiet title action in order to resell the property later. However, title to the property can be sold from one purchaser to another using a limited warranty or another quitclaim deed, though usually at far less than its market value.

Some jurisdictions allow for a post-sale "redemption period", whereby the former owner has a specified amount of time to reclaim the property by repaying the amount bid at auction plus interest, penalties, and/or other costs. As such, purchasers of properties at tax deed sales are cautioned not to make major improvements on the property until after the redemption period has expired, as such improvements would then become the property of the original owner.

A tax deed sale may also be used in conjunction with a tax lien sale process, whereby the lienholder (instead of a governmental agency) starts the process toward forcing a public sale of the property. In those instances the lienholder's investment (the price of the lien plus any additional costs necessary to start the tax deed sale process, such as required fees and payment of any still-unpaid taxes or buyout of other certificate holders' interests) constitutes the minimum bid; if no other bids are received at the sale then the lienholder will take title to the property subject to redemption periods (if applicable) or any lawsuit to overturn the sale.

==== Pitfalls of tax deed investing ====
Although the possibility of obtaining property at rates far below market values is promising, there are several pitfalls which must be taken into account before investing:

- Payment is usually required at purchase or within a very short time afterward (often no more than 24–72 hours), and certified funds are required (i.e. financing is not allowed). Failure to pay the full amount generally results in the sales of all properties purchased by the investor being cancelled; the investor may also be barred from future sales in that jurisdiction.
- Though touted as a means of obtaining property at very low cost, in practice when a property is placed for auction at a tax deed sale, it is usually sold at a higher price than the original minimum bid of the back taxes, accrued interest, and costs of sale.
- As stated above, in most jurisdictions properties sold in this manner are conveyed to the highest bidder via "tax deed" (or similarly-named deed), a form of quitclaim deed. Thus, the holder of the tax deed would then have to file a quiet title action, in order to clear any title defects or obtain a mortgage or title insurance.
- Should a property be obtained, it may still be subject to other liens and assessments on the property which are not extinguished at sale. These liens and assessments (and their related interest) can, in some instances, exceed the value of the property itself, making it virtually worthless.
- Some states allow a post-closing redemption period, during which time the original owner can redeem the property by paying the amount bid plus interest/penalty and costs. As such, if the purchaser makes improvements on the property and the original owner redeems it within the redemption period, the purchaser may lose those improvements if they are physically attached to the property and cannot be removed.

=== Tax lien sale ===
In a tax lien sale, instead of selling the actual property, the governmental entity sells a lien on the property. The lien is generally for the amount of delinquent taxes, accrued interest, and costs associated with the sale.

In the event that more than one investor seeks the same lien, depending on state law the winner will be determined by one of five methods:

1. Bid Down the Interest. Under this method, the stated rate of return offered by the government is the maximum rate of return allowed. However, investors can accept lower rates of return, including zero percent in some cases. The investor accepting the lowest rate of return is the winner. In the event that more than one investor will accept the same lower rate, the tie may be broken by 1) first bid received, 2) random selection, or 3) rotational method (see below for further discussion of the latter two methods). (States that use this method include Arizona and Florida)
2. Premium. Under this method, the investor willing to pay the highest premium (excess above the lien amount) will be the winner. The premium may earn interest at a different rate than the base lien value (or may not earn interest at all), and in some cases may not be paid back to the investor upon redemption of the lien. (States that include this method include Colorado; Colorado does not pay interest on the premium nor does it return it upon redemption)
3. Random Selection. Under this method, a bidder will be randomly selected from those offering a bid. Usually, a computer is used to make the selection, but in smaller jurisdictions more rudimentary methods may be used. (States that use this method include Nevada)
4. Rotational Selection. Under this method, the first lien offered for sale will be offered to the investor holding bidder number one, who has the right of first refusal. If bidder number one refuses the lien, bidder number two may then bid. However, bidder number one will not be offered another lien until his number comes up again in the rotation. The next lien will go to the next number in line. Under this method, the investor has virtually no control over which liens s/he will obtain in the bidding, except to take or refuse what is offered.
5. Bid Down the Ownership. The investor willing to purchase the lien for the lowest percent of encumbrance on the property will be awarded the lien. For example, a bidder may agree to take a lien on only 95% of the property. If the lien is not redeemed, the investor would only receive 95% ownership of the property with the remaining 5% owned by the original owner. In practice, few investors will bid on liens for less than full right to the property or sale proceeds. Therefore, with multiple owners bidding on 100% encumbrance, the process then generally reverts to a tiebreaker method such as random selection. (States that use this method include Iowa)

Liens not sold at auction are considered "struck" (sold) to the jurisdiction conducting the auction. Some jurisdictions allow "over the counter" purchases of liens not sold at auction, subject to some liens being exempt from sale.

The investor must wait a specified period of time (commonly referred to as the "redemption period") before taking action to foreclose on the property. During the redemption period, the lien (plus interest and any other fees) may be repaid by the owner or a legal designee of the owner. Usually the lien holder is not permitted during this period to contact the property owner (or anyone else having an interest in the property, such as the mortgage holder) to demand payment or threaten foreclosure, or else the lienholder can face sanctions (such as: termination of the lien and loss of money spent, being banned from future sales, and/or criminal charges).

In some jurisdictions, the lienholder must agree to pay subsequent unpaid property taxes during the redemption period in order to protect his/her interest. If the lienholder does not pay such taxes, a subsequent lienholder would "buy out" (redeem) the prior lienholder's interest. Other jurisdictions allow the lienholder first right to pay subsequent taxes, but if the lienholder chooses not to do so, a separate lien is offered for sale. Still other jurisdictions do not offer subsequent tax payment priority; each lien is sold separately (and can result in multiple liens on a property held by different lienholders).

Once the redemption period is over, the lien holder may initiate foreclosure proceedings. Normally, the cost of the proceedings will include, in addition to statutorily-mandated costs (such as application fees and costs for public notices), buy-outs of other liens and payment of any other unpaid taxes plus accrued interest. During the period between the initiation of proceedings and actual foreclosure, the property owner still has the opportunity to repay the lien with interest plus the costs incurred to foreclose.

The foreclosure proceedings, depending on the jurisdiction, may be either:

- "self-executing": after the expiration of the redemption period the lienholder will acquire title to the property, or
- "non-self-executing": after the expiration of the redemption period the entity will conduct a tax deed sale of the property; the payments made by the lienholder constitute the opening bid and, if no other bids are received, the lienholder will acquire title to the property (the lienholder may choose to participate in the sale beyond the opening bid and make additional bids on the property if so desired).

In both cases, as with tax deed sales, title to the property will normally be in the form of a quitclaim deed, thus requiring further action to quiet title.

If the lienholder does not act within a specified period of time, as defined by state law, the lien is forfeited and the holder loses his investment. This period of time cannot be extended unless the tax lien holder is officially in the process of foreclosing on the property or other legal action (such as bankruptcy) is pending.

A lien issued in error of state law is repaid, but usually at a far lower interest rate than had the lien been valid.

==== Popularity of tax lien sales ====
The popularity of tax lien sales is driven, in large part, by the maximum rate of returns offered, which can be far higher than other investments, as well as the guarantee that the governmental entity, if the lien is redeemed, will repay the investor. Examples of such high returns include:

- Iowa, which offers a guaranteed 2% per month simple interest return (24% annual return)
- Florida, which offers a maximum annual return rate of 18% (with a guaranteed minimum 5% return on the original lien investment, regardless of time held and regardless of the original rate bid, except if the rate bid was 0%)
- Arizona, which offers a maximum annual return rate of 16%

The market in tax liens has been so popular that a number of major banks and hedge funds have invested large amounts of capital in it.

==== Pitfalls of tax lien investing ====
Although the rates of return are promising, there are several pitfalls which must be taken into account before investing:

- Some jurisdictions require a large deposit at the outset of the sale, regardless of how many certificates are to be purchased or their value.
- Payment is usually required at purchase or within a very short time afterward (often no more than 24–72 hours). Failure to pay the full amount results in all lien certificates purchased by the investor being cancelled, and may result in the investor losing his/her deposit and/or being barred from future sales.
- In many states, further actions must be taken to protect the lien holder's rights after purchase of a lien, which require additional costs beyond the original investment (and the costs may or may not be repaid upon redemption). In addition, the actions must be performed within a certain period of time and in strict accordance with legal requirements; failure to comply exactly with such requirements may make the lien worthless and the investment lost.
- In "bid down the interest" jurisdictions, valuable properties are usually bid to the lowest rate possible greater than zero percent. Similarly, in "premium" states, valuable properties are bid up above the means of an average investor, and further, depending on the jurisdiction, the premium may not be repaid.
- Unlike a certificate of deposit, tax liens are illiquid. They cannot be "cashed in" (resold to the taxing authority), but must be held until either they are repaid or the holder takes action to foreclose. (It is possible to sell or assign one's interest in a tax lien to another party; such transfers usually require a fee to do so. However, the acquiring party may or may not wish to purchase the lien for the original amount.)
- Though touted as a means of obtaining property at very low cost, in practice liens are nearly always paid off prior to the auction date, and in those cases where the property is placed for auction, it is usually sold at a higher price than the original minimum bid of the lien, accrued interest, and costs of sale.
- As with tax deed sales, title to property is obtained via a form of quitclaim deed, thus requiring further action to quiet title.
- As with tax deed sales, a property obtained via tax lien may still be subject to other liens and assessments on the property which are not extinguished at sale, which (along with any accrued interest) can, in some instances, exceed the value of the property itself, making it virtually worthless.

== See also ==
- Archon Information Systems
