= George B. Zimpelman =

German-American statesman and businessman

George Bernhard Zimpelman (July 24, 1832 in Bavaria – 1908 in Austin, Texas) was a German-American who became an influential Texas statesman and businessman. After the Civil War he was often referred to as "Major Zimpelman", and as a Texas sheriff and business developer he helped to shape and secure land holdings in Texas. He was the previous owner of the now-famous LBJ Ranch.

== Early life ==
George Zimpelman was born at Nussdorf near Landau, Bavaria, on July 24, 1832, son of John Jacob Zimpelman, a successful, influential farmer. His mother, Maria Salome Hochdoeffer, was also a native of Bavaria. He was raised in Bavaria until about the age of fourteen. His early education was in several of the best classical schools during that time.

== Coming to America ==
In 1846, at age 14, he came to America with his uncle and aunt, who settled briefly in New Orleans, where he engaged as a clerk in a dry goods store. In 1847 he came to Texas with his family, locating in Austin. His uncle and aunt were stricken by an infectious outbreak they had picked up in Galveston and died shortly after arriving in Austin, leaving the adolescent George on his own with no immediate ties to his family overseas and no access to money. His first employment in Austin was as a carpenter, a trade which he mastered by 1854. In that same year he abandoned carpentry and took up gunsmithing. In 1856 he relocated to a farm just outside Austin and was engaged in agriculture and stock raising until the Civil War.

== Confederate military service ==
Upon the outbreak of the war in 1861, he promptly responded to the call, entering the Confederate service as a private in Colonel Terry's Texas Rangers, and remained in the army until the general surrender of the South. He served in the Eighth Regiment Texas Cavalry of the Rangers, who became famous on both sides of the conflict. Among his principal engagements were Forrest's capture of Murfreesboro; the fighting under Wheeler in 1862; the battles of Shiloh, Perryville, Shelbyville, Chickamauga, Marietta, New Hope Church and Decatur. He was wounded six times in battle, three times during the Battle of Atlanta, and three times in other engagements.

== Taming Texas ==
When the war came to an end he took up life back on the farm near Austin, and in 1866 he was elected sheriff, but he was quickly deposed by the military Reconstructionist authority. Towards the end of Reconstruction, in 1869 Mr. Zimpelman was a second time elected Sheriff, and held office until 1876. He loosely formed a posse referred to as Zimpelmen's Guard, during what became known as the San Elizario Salt War. Though not officially a part of the Texas Rangers he worked in close conjunction with them to help tame the vast lawless region and secure safety for the United States border areas that once belonged to Spain and Mexico.

== Texas business and land development ==
Zimpelman's entry into the banking business with Foster, Ludlow & Co marked the beginning of a long career as a business capitalist. In 1878 he was made secretary and treasurer of The Bridge Company. He also served as vice president of The Ice Company and was in involved early state land development and the first Texas land insurance company, Zimpelman & Bergen (now known as Gracy Title Company), founded in 1873. He held the 3,070-acre (1,240 ha) tract of land that would later become the LBJ Ranch owned by the Lyndon B. Johnson family.

== Administrative and social activities ==
He served as a Trans-Mississippi Commercial Congress delegate and later served as Colonel on Gen. Sul Ross' (later Texas governor) staff; was postmaster at Austin four years during President Cleveland's administration, and again served a four-year term under President Roosevelt, he was a member of the Knights Templar; of the Elks Lodge; and of the John B. Hood Camp of Confederate Veterans.
