= American Land Title Association =

National trade association

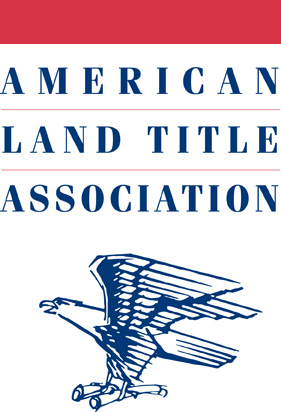
Logo of the American Land Title Association, founded in 1907

The American Land Title Association (ALTA), founded in 1907, is the national trade association representing more than 6,400 title insurance companies, title and settlement agents, independent abstractors, title searchers, and real estate attorneys. ALTA's headquarters are located in Washington, D.C. In 2019, ALTA established the Coalition to Stop Real Estate Wire Fraud.

== Overview ==
ALTA members conduct title searches, examinations, closings and issue title insurance that protects real property owners and mortgage lenders against losses from defects in titles.

== Governance ==
The 11-member ALTA Board of Governors is responsible for creating the association's strategic priorities, managing the financial health of the association and overseeing the work of more than 40 committees.
