= Transfer of equity =

English legal process

Transfer of equity is an English legal term for the process where the ownership of a share or interest in a property is transferred from one entity to another, a partial conveyance.

Transfers of equity can take place for multiple reasons. Examples include:

- Marriage or living together: When people marry they often transfer the property into the names of both parties.
- Divorce or separation: When a couple divorce or separate, property is typically transferred, sometime with compensation. Restructuring a joint mortgage requires the mortgage company's consent.
- Tax planning: Property owners may transfer equity to their children or other family members to manage their tax liabilities.

Transferring equity can be complex, involving land registry applications and stamp duty land tax forms. In these circumstances, a transfer of equity usually involves a conveyancing practitioner to deal with the formalities.

Lenders' requirements are generally set out in the CML Lenders' Handbook.
