= Commonwealth Land Title Insurance Company =

Real Estate Title Insurance Company of Philadelphia
- Formerly: Real Estate Title Insurance Company of Philadelphia
- Industry: title insurance
- Founded: 1876
- Headquarters: Pennsylvania
- Key people: Joshua H. Morris

The Real Estate Title Insurance Company of Philadelphia was the world's first title insurance company.

== Background ==
Prior to the invention of title insurance, buyers in real estate transactions bore sole responsibility for ensuring the validity of the land title held by the seller. If the title were later deemed invalid or found to be fraudulent, the buyer lost their investment.

In 1868, the case of Watson v. Muirhead was heard by the Pennsylvania Supreme Court. Plaintiff Muirhead had lost his investment in a real estate transaction as the result of a prior lien on the property. Defendant Watson, the conveyancer, had discovered the lien prior to the sale but told Muirhead the title was clear after his lawyer had (erroneously) determined that the lien was not valid.

The courts ruled that Watson (and others in similar situations) was not liable for mistakes based on professional opinions.

As a result of the case the Pennsylvania legislature included a section allowing for the incorporation of title insurance companies in The General Corporation Act passed an 1874.

== History ==
Joshua H. Morris, a conveyancer in Philadelphia, and several colleagues met on 28 March 1876 to incorporate the first title insurance company to address the issue. The new firm, they stated, would "insure the purchasers of real estate and mortgages against losses from defective titles, liens and encumbrances," and that "through these facilities, transfer of real estate and real estate securities can be made more speedily and with greater security than heretofore." It took the name of The Real Estate Title Insurance Company of Philadelphia.

Martha Morris, Joshua's aunt, purchased the first policy, valued at $1,500, on 24 June 1876 to cover a mortgage on a home on 718 North 43rd Street in Philadelphia.

In 1881 the company changed its name to The Real Estate Title Insurance and Trust Company of Philadelphia and in 1927 merged with the Land Title and Trust Company (founded in 1885) and the West End Trust Company to form The Real Estate-Land Title and Trust Company, which was shorted to Land Title Bank and Trust Company in 1936. During a merger in 1953 with the Tradesmen National Bank and Trust Company to create the Trademens Land Title Bank and Trust Company, the title insurance division was turned into a wholly owned subsidiary known as the Land Title Insurance Company. It was in 1955 that the Trademens Bank decided to sell off the Land Title Insurance Company to the Commonwealth Title Company.

The Commonwealth Title Insurance and Trust Company of Philadelphia was incorporated in 1886. In 1928 it merged with the Provident Trust Company which turned its title insurance business over to a wholly owned subsidiary known as Commonwealth Title Insurance Company. The newly formed subsidiary quickly consolidated the title insurance business in Philadelphia by absorbing six local title insurance companies and assuming a new name as the Commonwealth Title Company of Philadelphia in 1929. In 1938 it acquired the Pennsylvania Title Insurance Company from the Central-Penn National Bank.

In 1955 that The company became the Commonwealth Land Title Insurance Company through a merger with the Land Title Insurance Company (successor to the old Real Estate Title Insurance Company). In 1964, Commonwealth purchased Louisville Title Insurance Company of Kentucky. Commonwealth merged with Provident National Bank in 1969 and was sold to the Reliance Group, Inc. six years later. As part of the Reliance Group, Commonwealth merged in 1990 with Transamerica Corporation's subsidiary Transamerica Title Insurance Company which later became Transnation Title Company. It later became part of LandAmerica. When LandAmerica went bankrupt, it sold Commonwealth to Fidelity National Financial.
