= San Elizario Salt War =

1877 conflict in El Paso, Texas

- Part of the Range Wars
- Date: 1877–1878
- Location: El Paso County, Texas, United States
- Also known as: Salinero Revolt; El Paso Salt War
- Outcome: Uprising suppressed
- Deaths: 20–30

The San Elizario Salt War, also known as the Salinero Revolt or the El Paso Salt War, was an extended and complex range war of the mid-19th century that revolved around the ownership and control of immense salt lakes at the base of the Guadalupe Mountains in West Texas. What began in 1866 as a political and legal struggle among Anglo-Texan politicians and capitalists gave rise in 1877 to an armed struggle by ethnic Mexican and Tejano inhabitants living on both sides of the Rio Grande near El Paso against a leading politician, who was supported by the Texas Rangers. The struggle reached its climax with the siege and surrender of 20 Texas Rangers to a popular army of perhaps 500 men in the town of San Elizario, Texas. The arrival of the African-American 9th Cavalry and a sheriff's posse of New Mexico mercenaries caused hundreds of Tejanos to flee to Mexico, some in permanent exile. The right of individuals to own the salt lakes, which had previously been held as a community asset, was established by force of arms.

The conflict began as a local quarrel and grew in stages to finally occupy the attention of both the Texas and federal governments. Newspaper editors throughout the nation covered the story, often with frenzied tone and in lurid detail. At the conflict's height, as many as 650 men bore arms. About 20 to 30 men were killed in the 12-year fight for salt, and perhaps double that number were wounded.

Traditionally, the uprising of Mexican-Americans during the San Elizario Salt War has been described by historians as a bloody riot by a howling mob. The Texas Rangers who surrendered, especially their commander, have been described as unfit. More recent scholarship has placed the war within the context of the long and often violent social struggle of Mexican-Americans to be treated as equal citizens in the United States and not as a subjugated people. Most recently, the "mob" has been described as an organized political-military insurgency with the goal of re-establishing local control of their fundamental political rights and economic future.

== Background ==
=== National ambiguity ===
The Rio Grande is a natural barrier in West Texas. Long before claims to the region were made by Anglo-Americans, Spanish colonials and later Mexicans settled a series of communities along the south banks of the river, which provided protection from Comanche and Apache raids from the north. Prior to major water-control projects on the Rio Grande such as Elephant Butte Dike, which was constructed in the early 20th century, the river flooded often. San Elizario was a relatively large community south of the river from its founding in 1789 until an 1829 flood changed the course of the river, leaving San Elizario on "La Isla", a new island between the new and old channels of the Rio Grande.

This position relative to the river became more important in 1836, when the newly independent Republic of Texas proclaimed the Rio Grande as the southern border of the new country. The nationality of the people of San Elizario was disputed until the signing of the Treaty of Guadalupe Hidalgo in 1848, which ended the Mexican–American War and identified the "deepest channel", i.e. the southern channel, as the official international boundary. The status of San Elizario was further made official by the 1853 treaty that sold the territory of the Gadsden Purchase to the United States. At that time, San Elizario was the largest US community between San Antonio, Texas, and Santa Fe, New Mexico. It was a major stop on the Camino Real and was the county seat of the region.

=== Civil War and Reconstruction ===
The American Civil War created great changes in the political landscape of West Texas. The end of the war and Reconstruction brought many entrepreneurs to the area. The families of San Elizario had deep roots and were loath to accept the newcomers. Many Republicans settled in the small community of Franklin, Texas, a trading village across the Rio Grande from the Chihuahua city of El Paso del Norte (present-day Ciudad Juárez).

By the beginning of the 1870s, the Democratic Party had begun to reclaim political influence in the state. The Democratic operatives, with their ties to the Southern United States, were not accepted by the people of San Elizario either, as they retained generational ties to Mexico. Alliances shifted and rivalries developed between the Hispanic, Republican and Democratic factions in West Texas.

=== Salt ===
At the base of the Guadalupe Mountains, about 100 mi (160 km) northeast of San Elizario, lie a series of dry saline lakes (located at 31.74335°N 105.07668°W). Before the pumping of water and oil from West Texas, the area had a periodic shallow water table, and capillary action drew salt of a high purity to the surface. This salt was valuable for a wide variety of purposes, including preserving meats and replenishing what sweating took from humans and animals. Its value made it a commodity used for barter along El Camino Real de Tierra Adentro and was an essential element in the patio process for extracting silver from ore in Chihuahua mines. Historically, caravans to the salt lakes traveled either down the Rio Grande and then straight north or via what became the Butterfield Overland Mail route. In 1863, the people of San Elizario, as a community, built by subscription a road running east to the salt lakes. Early residents of the Rio Grande valley at El Paso were granted community access rights to these lakes by the King of Spain, and these rights were later grandfathered in by the Republic of Mexico and in accordance with the Treaty of Guadalupe Hidalgo. Beginning in 1866, the Texas Constitution allowed individuals to stake claims for mineral rights, thus overturning the traditional community rights.

== Political phase, 1866–1877 ==
In 1870, a group of influential leaders from Franklin claimed the land on which the salt deposits were found. They were unsuccessful in gaining sole title to the land, and a feud over its ownership and control began. William Wallace Mills favored individual private ownership, Louis Cardis favored the Hispanic community concept of commonwealth, and Albert Jennings Fountain favored county government ownership with community access. This led Cardis and Fountain to join together as the so-called "Anti-Salt ring", while Mills became the leader of the opposing "Salt ring".

Fountain was elected to the Texas State Senate and began pushing for his plan of county government ownership with community access. San Elizario's Spanish priest, Father Antonio Borrajo, opposed the plan and gained the support of Cardis. On December 7, 1870, Judge Gaylord J. Clarke, a supporter of Mills, was killed. Fountain and Cardis sparred with every political and legal tool at their command. The Republicans' loss of state government control in 1873 prompted Fountain to leave El Paso for his wife's home in the New Mexico Territory.

In 1872, Charles Howard, a Virginian by birth, came to the region determined to restore the Democratic Party to power in West Texas. His natural rival was Mills, so he struck up an alliance with Cardis, who was influential with Hispanic voters in the region. Cardis had a stronger allegiance to the former citizens of Mexico than to either US political party, and was influential in swinging their votes in any direction he thought beneficial to the community or to himself. Howard was elected district judge and about the same time began feuding with Cardis over who would be the county's political "top dog".

In the summer of 1877, Howard filed a claim for the salt lakes in the name of his father-in-law, George B. Zimpelman, an Austin capitalist. Howard offered to pay any salinero who collected salt the going rate for its retrieval, but he insisted the salt was his. The Tejanos of San Elizario, encouraged by Father Borrajo (by now the former pastor), with the support of Cardis, gathered and kept salt in spite of Howard's claim. The people did not look only to outside leaders. Falling back on a long tradition of local self-government, they formed committees (juntas) in San Elizario and the largely Tejano neighboring towns of Socorro and Ysleta, Texas, to determine a community-based response to Howard's actions. During the summer of 1877, they held several secretive, decisional, and organizational meetings.

== The Salt War of 1877 ==
=== Murder of Cardis ===
On September 29, 1877, José Mariá Juárez and Macedonia Gandara threatened to collect a wagonload of salt. When Howard learned of their activities, he had the men arrested by El Paso County Sheriff Charles Kerber and went to court in San Elizario that evening to legally restrain them. A faction of armed men arrested the compliant jurist, however, and others went in search of Howard, locating him at Sheriff Kerber's home in Yselta. Under the leadership of Francisco "Chico" Barela, they seized Howard and marched him back to San Elizario. For three days, he was held prisoner by several hundred men, led by Sisto Salcido, Lino Granillo, and Barela. On October 3, he was finally released upon payment of a $12,000 bond and his written relinquishment of all rights to the salt deposits. Howard left for Mesilla, New Mexico, where he briefly stayed at the home of Fountain. He soon returned to the area, and on October 10, shot and killed Cardis in an El Paso (formerly Franklin) mercantile store. Howard fled back to New Mexico. The Tejano people of El Paso County were outraged. They effectively put a stop to all county government, replacing it with community juntas and daring the sheriff to take any action against them.

=== Texas Rangers intercede ===
In response to pleas from a frightened Anglo community (numbering fewer than 100 residents out of nearly 5,000 in the county), Governor of Texas Richard B. Hubbard answered by sending Major John B. Jones, commander of the Texas Rangers' Frontier Battalion, to El Paso. Arriving on November 5, Jones met with the junta leaders, negotiated their agreement to obey the law, and arranged Howard's return, arraignment, and release on bail. Jones also recruited 20 new Texas Rangers, the Detachment of Company C, under the command of Lieutenant John B. Tays, a native Canadian. Traditionally, Tays has been described as an uneducated handyman, but later research indicated he was a mining engineer, El Paso land speculator, and smuggler of Mexican cattle. His appointment to command the local Ranger detachment was approved by leading Anglos. The Ranger detachment recruited by Jones and Tays was mixed, composed of Anglos and a few Tejanos, including an old Indian fighter, several Civil War veterans, an experienced lawman, at least one outlaw, and a few community pillars. Individually, they included some capable men, but the unit lacked tradition or cohesion.

=== Texas Rangers surrender ===
On December 12, 1877, Howard returned to San Elizario with a company of 20 Texas Rangers led by Tays. Once again, a group of armed insurgents descended upon them. Howard and the Rangers took cover in the buildings, eventually taking refuge in the town's church. After a two-day siege, Tays surrendered the company of Rangers, marking the only time in history a Texas Ranger unit ever surrendered to adversaries. Howard, Ranger Sergeant John McBride, and merchant and ex-police lieutenant John G. Atkinson were immediately executed by firing squad with their bodies hacked and dumped into a well. The Rangers were disarmed and sent out of town. The civic leaders of San Elizario fled to Mexico, and the people of the town looted the buildings. In all, 12 people were killed and 50 wounded.

== Legacy ==
Besides the many casualties, the war cost an estimated $31,050 in property damage. Additionally, many crop losses were sustained because local farmers did not till or harvest their fields for several months; loss of wheat crops alone was estimated at $48,000. To these immediate financial losses (collectively equivalent to $1,482,000 in 2025) can be added the further political and economic marginalization of the Mexican-American community of El Paso County.

As a result of the unrest, San Elizario lost its status as county seat, which was relocated to the growing town of El Paso. The 9th Cavalry of Buffalo Soldiers were sent to re-establish Fort Bliss to keep an eye on the border and the local Mexican population. When the railroad came to West Texas in 1883, it bypassed San Elizario. The town's population decreased, and ethnic Mexicans lost much of their political influence in the region.
