= Quiet title =

Lawsuit over ownership of real property

An action to quiet title is a lawsuit brought in a court having jurisdiction over property disputes, in order to establish a party's title to real property, or personal property having a title, of against anyone and everyone, and thus "quiet" any challenges or claims to the title.

This legal action is "brought to remove a cloud on the title" so that plaintiff and those in privity with them may forever be free of claims against the property. The action to quiet title resembles other forms of "preventive adjudication," such as the declaratory judgment.

This genre of lawsuit is also sometimes called either a try title, trespass to try title, or ejectment action "to recover possession of land wrongfully occupied by a defendant."

== Grounds for a quiet title action or complaint ==
It comprises a complaint that the ownership (title) of a parcel of land or other real property is defective in some fashion, typically where title to the property is ambiguous—for example, where it has been conveyed by a quitclaim deed through which the previous owner disclaims all interest, but does not promise that good title is conveyed. Such an action may also be brought to dispel a restraint on alienation or another party's claim of a nonpossessory interest in land, such as an easement by prescription.

Other typical grounds for complaint include:

- adverse possession where the new possessor sues to obtain title in his or her own name;
- fraudulent conveyance of a property, perhaps by a forged deed or under coercion;
- Torrens title registration, an action which terminates all unrecorded claims;
- treaty disputes regarding the boundaries between nations;
- tax taking issues, where a municipality claims title in lieu of back taxes owed (or a subsequent purchaser of land at a tax sale files action to gain insurable title);
- boundary disputes between states, municipalities, or private parties;
- surveying errors
- competing claims by reverters, remainders, missing heirs and lien holders (often arising in basic foreclosure actions when satisfied liens are not properly discharged from title due to clerical or recording errors between the county clerk and the satisfied lien holder)

== Limitations ==
Unlike acquisition through a deed of sale, a quiet title action will give the party seeking such relief no cause of action against previous owners of the property, unless the plaintiff in the quiet title action acquired its interest through a warranty deed and had to bring the action to settle defects that existed when the warranty deed was delivered.

Not all quiet title actions "clear title" completely. Some states have a quiet title action for the purpose of clearing a particular, known claim, title defect, or perceived defect. This is contrasted with title registration which settles all title issues, both known and unknown. Quiet title actions are always subject to attack and are particularly vulnerable to jurisdictional challenges, both subject matter and personal, even years after final court decree in the action. It usually takes 3–6 months depending on the state where it is done.

A quiet title action is also subject in many geographic jurisdictions to a statute of limitations. This limitations of action is often 10 or 20 years.

== See also ==
- Title (property)
