= Probate research =

Probate research deals with finding heirs and proving their right to an inheritance. In some estates, there may be no known heirs, or there may be missing heirs whose names are known but their contact information is not. Succession law determines who a person's legal heirs (also called legal issue in the US) are. There also may be known heirs from one part of the family, but another part of the family may be unknown (usually the case in intestate succession) In other cases, an heir may not be a family member, but someone who has been named as heir in a last will and testament. Named heirs can also be missing, or have predeceased the testator, leading to the need for probate research. In all these instances, professional probate researchers work to trace the next-of-kin, or the named heirs, in the case of a last will and testament.

Probate researchers are also called heir hunters, heir searchers, probate genealogists, and forensic genealogists.

Intestacy laws vary enormously from one country to another, and in the US, they also vary from state to state. Thus, probate researchers must have extensive knowledge of the law to know which family members are legally entitled to inherit. They are not necessarily solicitors, advocates, general law practitioners, or paralegals. They may also have a wide variety of educational and/or research backgrounds. They also employ specialized genealogical and investigative techniques to search public records and databases to identify the extended family of the deceased, often starting with no more than a name and date of death and in some cases looking for relatives as distant as second cousins. In many cases, the heirs that are finally identified have little or no knowledge of the person from whom they are inheriting.

Probate researchers are hired by solicitors in the United Kingdom, or Estate Attorneys in the United States. In other countries they may be hired by notaries. It is also common for them to independently source estates classed as bona vacantia whereby research is undertaken at their own risk and expense with fees recovered via a commission-based agreement.

On the other hand, this system does not exist in countries such as Japan. In Japan, in particular, it must exercise caution regarding such activities, as they bear a striking resemblance to the methods used in "wire-transfer fraud" (furikome sagi). In Japan, there is no nationwide database of personal information accessible to anyone other than government officials, which makes probate research difficult.

== Popular culture ==
The BBC has made twelve series (260 programmes) of Heir Hunters, shown on UK BBC TV about a number of UK companies. Episodes have also been screened in South Africa, Australia and New Zealand. Outside of the UK, probate research cases are documented and presented on Belgian television in the series Erfgenaam Gezocht (VTM Go) and on Dutch television in De Erfgenaam, which is produced by Endemol and airs on Dutch Channel RTL 4.

In 2024, Channel 4 aired Key To A Fortune. The show explores instances when a property is left in an inheritance and the decision to renovate or sell. Key To A Fortune featured UK probate researchers, Blanchards Inheritance, who traced the heirs and handled the property. Key To A Fortune aired 6 episodes.

== The future of probate research ==
As the population lives longer due to improved health, and is more mobile the problem of tracing missing heirs potentially becomes more difficult despite the growth of more web based research tools.

Many people are still reluctant to draft a proper will, or make bad ones which later prove invalid, or can easily be contested. As a consequence, millions pass to the state, after a qualify period in trust waiting for claims from entitled beneficiaries, or being found by probate researchers or Heir Hunters.
