= Archon Information Systems =

Archon Information Systems, L.L.C.
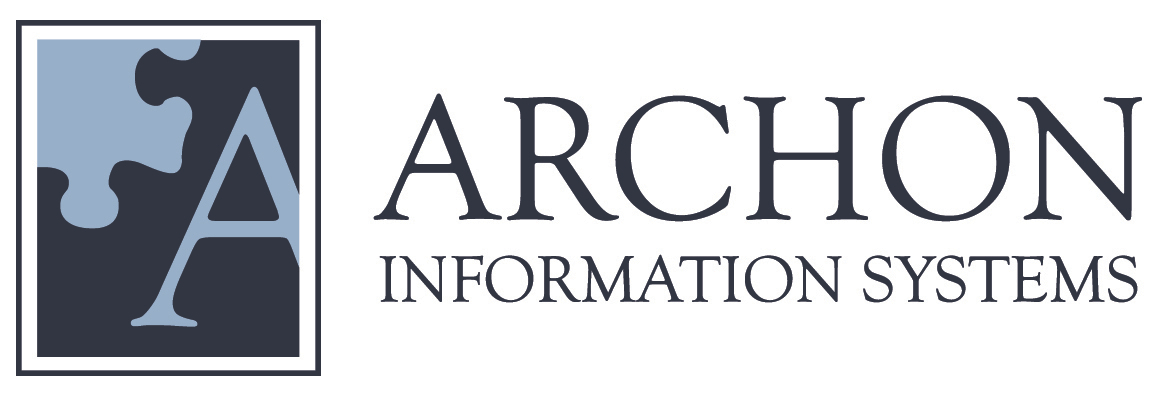
- Type: Limited liability corporation
- Industry: Software; Technology services Collection services
- Founded: New Orleans, Louisiana, United States; January 1, 2008 (18 years ago)
- Founder: Bryan Barrios; Beau Button; William Sossamon
- Headquarters: Incorporation: Delaware; Operational: New Orleans, Louisiana, United States
- Area served: United States
- Key people: Bryan Barrios (CEO)
- Products: CivicSource Software Suite
- Number of employees: 60
- Website: archoninfosys.com

Archon Information Systems, L.L.C. (“Archon”) is a Delaware corporation that provides technology and collection services to government clients.

The focus of Archon's services is the collection and management of delinquent ad valorem taxes, which are local governments' major source of revenue. Software development is the core of Archon’s business model, and utilizes the test-driven development design method. The company's best-known software products are the CivicSource brand of proprietary software, including CivicSource Administrator (for management of property taxes) and CivicSource Auctioneer (for conducting Internet-based tax and foreclosure sales). Archon's first major client, the City of New Orleans, used the company's software and services to host multiple online tax sales. The first of these was the first online tax sale in the Gulf South region, and the first tax sale held in New Orleans, Louisiana, after Hurricane Katrina. New Orleans netted increased revenue in property tax collection over previous sales to date.

== History ==
With corporate headquarters in New Orleans, Louisiana, Archon has representatives in states across the U.S. focused on outreach to local governments. Archon was founded in January 2008 by three professionals native to New Orleans, Louisiana. Bryan P. Barrios, chief executive officer, had been working in the legal field, specifically with local tax collections, for 12 years with a law firms in the City of New Orleans at Archon's formation. Barrios has drafted several pieces of legislation for both New Orleans and for the Louisiana State Legislature relative to the area of municipal tax collections, including the provision pertaining to online tax sales in Archon's home state.

Also at the time of formation, Chief Operations Officer Beau L. Button and Chief Technology Officer William D. Sossamon had been working in technology for over 12 years, and had worked on technology projects and contracts with multiple Fortune 500 companies before creating Archon. In 2012, both were named Top Young Entrepreneurs to Watch in New Orleans by Under30CEO.

Archon software and services has been behind multiple online tax sales throughout the State of Louisiana. These were first of its kind in the region, and the first tax sales of any kind post-Katrina. Archon services also facilitated all the statutory requirements relative to tax sale notifications, certificates and filings. The pre-tax sale collection efforts driven by Archon technology resulted in more timely collections and an increase in revenue for all of its tax sale clients.

The company has approximately 53 employees in its New Orleans headquarters.

== Products ==
Archon develops its own software titles and offers a range of products and services; Archon also works with clients to custom-develop software.

=== CivicSource Software Suite ===
The CivicSource proprietary software suite consists of three primary components (CivicSource Administrator, CivicSource Auctioneer and CivicSource Services) that consolidate every aspect of tax management, tax collection or tax sale. The suite provides governments the ability to search, view and edit taxable properties and owners, provides for digital management of documents associated with the delinquent properties, and provides a platform for online disposition of tax liens, tax deeds, adjudicated and foreclosed properties.

== Corporate ==
Archon's headquarters are located in the Central Business District of Downtown New Orleans, on the 17th floor of the New Orleans Exchange Centre.
