= Heir Hunters =

2007 British TV series

- Genre: Factual
- Directed by: John Widdup (series 4)
- Presented by: Nadia Sawalha (series 1); Lisa Faulkner (series 2–11); Michael Buerk (series 12)
- Country of origin: United Kingdom
- Original language: English
- No. of series: 12
- No. of episodes: 240

Production
- Executive producers: Matthew Gordon; Roger Bolton (2012)
- Producers: Harriet Scott (2012); John Widdup (2010–2011); Livia Russell (2009); Paula Fasht (2008)
- Production location: Various
- Running time: 45–60 minutes
- Production company: Flame Television

Original release
- Network: BBC One
- Release: 4 June 2007 – 27 July 2018

Heir Hunters is a BBC television programme focusing on attempts to find missing or unknown heirs, entitled to deceased people's estates before the British Treasury lawfully collects the money. The show follows the work of probate researchers from a number of different firms to show how the results of time-consuming research turned out. The main firms followed have been Fraser and Fraser, Celtic Research and Finders International.

It was announced in 2011 that Heir Hunters would run in both BBC One daytime and in primetime television on BBC Two that autumn. The eleventh series was aired on BBC One from 27 February 2017.

== Description ==
The series is made by Flame TV, which is part of the Avalon Group. The first series was presented by Nadia Sawalha, while all subsequent series are narrated by Lisa Faulkner up to series 11. Series 12 is presented by Michael Buerk. The programme combined the worlds of legal probate genealogy and family history for the first time attracting audiences of over 1.2 million.

The series was devised and developed by Jezz Wright for Irish Production company MINT TV after a meeting with Hector Birchwood from Celtic Research and Fraser and Fraser who features in the series. BBC Daytime executive Richard Thomson commissioned the first series to run alongside ITV's Trisha which had moved to Channel 5. MINT TV opted for a co-production with FLAME TV for the first series.

The series runs as part of BBC One's weekday lineup in the early morning factual slot (9:15 am – 10:00 am), alongside shows including Animal 24:7 and Helicopter Heroes. The second series had record viewing numbers for the time slot and beat The Jeremy Kyle Show on ITV consistently during its run, prompting the BBC to immediately recommission repeatedly series after series with series 11 being filmed in the autumn of 2016.

The title cards for the 2008 and later series spell 'Heir Hunters' as 'H£ir Hunt£rs', using the pound sterling sign as a capital E. In each programme of the first two series three unclaimed estates from Bona Vacantia are mentioned in the hope of information being given by a viewer which could help find an heir or heirs. One of these mentioned in the first series resulted in information that led to some heirs being found for an estate.

The term "Heir Hunter" has become known to refer to any person or firm who tracks down beneficiaries to estates of deceased persons. "Heir hunters" may also be known as probate genealogists, probate researchers, heir searchers, or forensic genealogists although the latter is mainly an American term for the industry.

Heir Hunters are unregulated in the UK although STEP (the Society of Trust and Estate Practitioners) have endorsed their use.

The series has been repeated on the A+E Networks UK channels History and Bio. and UKTV channels Watch and Yesterday.

In 2011, it began to be transmitted on the History Channel in the UK, New Zealand and Australia. Despite being syndicated around the world the participants only received a nominal £1.00 in return for signing a standard Flame TV/reality television waiver.

From 21 November to 2 December 2011, ten re-versioned episodes of series 5 were shown on BBC Two at 7pm each weekday. The expanded episodes have an increased duration of 59 minutes and feature Lisa Faulkner on camera for the first time interviewing experts and Heir Hunters. BBC Two had ordered 20 episodes in total the 2nd set of 10 were from series 6 and were aired in January 2013.

== Transmissions ==
The series was aired in a stripped daily format, running Monday – Friday for 3, 4, 5 and 4 weeks respectively. Series 10 was set to be re-edited into repeated 30-minute versions later in 2016 whilst filming for series 11 got underway. Series 11 began screening in 2017 and filming for Series 12 began in June 2017.

Series	Start date	End date	Episodes
1	4 June 2007	22 June 2007	15
2	30 June 2008	25 July 2008	20
3	29 June 2009	31 July 2009	25
4	18 January 2010	12 February 2010	20
5	21 February 2011	25 March 2011	20
5	21 November 2011	4 December 2011	10
6	16 April 2012	11 May 2012	20
6	7 January 2013	25 January 2013	10
7	4 March 2013	29 March 2013	20
8	3 March 2014	28 March 2014	20
9	23 February 2015	23 March 2015	20
10	29 February 2016	29 March 2016	20
11	27 February 2017	25 August 2017	20
12	16 April 2018	27 July 2018	20

== See also ==
- Probate research
