= Missing heir =

A missing heir is a person related to a decedent (dead person), or testator of a will, but whose residence, domicile, Post office, or other address is not known. A missing heir may be an orphan or other person under a disability, who may need a guardian or custodian of funds.

Missing heirs often come up in the context of legal actions involving wills, title to real property, or a quiet title action. A private investigator, probate research firm or forensic genealogist may be hired by the executor, trustee, or administrator to find the missing heirs. In 2016, the United States Department of Justice investigated whether missing heir firms were colluding to fix fees.

A probate court or surrogate judge may require the service of a citation, notice of petition, summons, or subpoena to the relevant persons who may be missing persons, or may know the whereabouts of such person. Probate research companies specialize in locating missing and unknown heirs.
