= Old Republic International =

American property insurance and title insurance company

Old Republic International Corporation
- Company type: Public company
- Traded as: NYSE: ORI; S&P 400 component
- Industry: Insurance
- Founded: 1923; 102 years ago
- Headquarters: Chicago, Illinois, U.S.
- Key people: Craig R. Smiddy; (President & CEO)
- Number of employees: 8,700 (2017)
- Website: oldrepublic.com

Old Republic International Corporation is an American property insurance and title insurance company. The company is headquartered in Chicago, Illinois.
