= Louis Cardis =

American politician (1825–1877)

Louis Cardis (1825–1877) was an American politician who served as a member of the Texas House of Representatives from 1874 until his assassination in 1877.

He was born in the Piedmont region of what was then the Kingdom of Sardinia. He served as a captain in Giuseppe Garibaldi's army before immigrating to the United States in 1854. Cardis moved to El Paso, Texas in 1864. He quickly learned the Spanish language and established a political power base with the Mexican American citizens of the area.

He became involved in a dispute involving salt deposits and the shifting of influence and political power from the Hispanic population to the Anglo. He was elected to the Texas House of Representatives with the help of Charles H. Howard.

Cardis had a falling out with Howard after Howard staked an exclusive claim to the salt deposits. Cardis had his allies imprison Howard, and Howard retaliated by shooting Cardis to death with a shotgun on October 9, 1877.

Two months later Howard was killed by Cardis' former supporters from San Elizario.

== See also ==
- List of assassinated American politicians
