= Local authority search =

In the United Kingdom, a local authority search (also known as local land charges search or local search) refers to the provision of specific information about a particular property and the surrounding area for buyers and sellers. This is undertaken as part of the conveyancing process by a solicitor or a licensed conveyancer. If you are borrowing money to finance the purchase it will normally be a condition of the advance that you obtain a local search. If you are not having finance it is your option whether to have a local search or not.

The solicitor or licensed conveyancer acts on behalf of the property buyer or the tenant, and liaises with the local authority who are responsible for carrying out the local authority search. The timescale for the return of the search result depends on which local authority carries out the search. The majority of local authorities return search results in under five working days. It is also possible to undertake a personal search of the local land charges register. This can be done by anyone but requires the searcher to have a knowledge of what they are viewing. A personal search is free. A personal search does not include all of the information required to complete a full local search. The remaining information must be acquired from public registers and viewing information under the environmental information regulations.

== Purpose ==
The main purpose of a local search is to protect property buyers from any unpleasant eventualities that could affect their use and enjoyment of the property or which may have an effect upon its value (for purchaser and potential lender), and therefore is a key element in the conveyancing process. The local search will provide information that is designed to reveal any potential problems or issues with the property and the surrounding area, which enables the buyer to make an informed decision on the current state of the property. The local search is essentially designed to provide important information that would potentially influence the use, the renting out or future reselling of the property.

== Inclusions ==
A local authority search comprises two separate parts consisting of two different documents:

=== Certificate of search form ===
The LLC1 form is obtained from His Majesty's Stationery Office and is in general submitted by the solicitor or licensed conveyancer of the property buyer. The following information could be obtained from LLC1, a search of the local land charges register:

- Listed buildings
- Conservation areas
- Tree protection orders
- Improvement or renovation grants
- Smoke control zones
- Future developments

=== Enquiries ===
The CON 29 document consists of two separate parts; CON 29 and CON 29(O). The CON 29 questions apply in all transactions and the CON 29(O) stands for "Optional Questions", which means that it is open to a conveyancer to make these enquiries if appropriate to the transaction and property. Examples of the environmental information that are provided by CON 29 include the following:

- Building control history
- Planning control history
- Nearby road schemes and motorways
- Contaminated land
- Radon gas

The CON 29(O) form deals with a number of extra enquiries, which are optional depending on the property circumstances. Examples of the enquiries dealt with by the CON 29(O) include the following:

- Road proposals by private bodies
- Public paths or byways
- Advertisements
- Completion notices
- Parks and countryside
- Pipelines
- Houses in multiple occupation
- Noise abatement
- Urban development areas
- Enterprise zones
- Inner urban improvement areas
- Simplified planning zones
- Land maintenance notices
- Mineral consultation areas
- Hazardous substance consents
- Environmental and pollution notices
- Food safety notices
- Hedgerow notices
- Common land, town & village greens

In 2013-14, the Law Society of England and Wales carried out a consultation (available via the Law Society website) on revisions to both CON29 forms.

== Affected areas ==
A local authority search will affect all residential and commercial properties in England and Wales. The information required from the search is maintained by every local authority in England and Wales. In Scotland and Ireland, there are still a number of searches required to be carried out in the process, not specifically called a local authority search.

== What are local authorities ==
A local authority is a government subdivision of England and Wales, and is responsible for many services in the area it covers. Each area of England and Wales is covered by a local council or authority, which are responsible for maintaining various services in the area. In many cases, a local council is the lower tier authority in an area. For example, Cheshire in England, which is a non-metropolitan and ceremonial county, manages services such as the police, library, education, transport and fire services. Cheshire is actually split into two smaller council areas for the purpose of local authority searches, Cheshire-East and Cheshire-West.

In addition, an area may be governed by a unitary authority, which would provide all the services that Cheshire does but is not subdivided any further, meaning a unitary authority would also be responsible for the local authority search.

The only exception to the rule is Greater London, which is a top-level administration division of England, and each of the 32 boroughs included is the responsible for the local authority search.

== HM Land Registry's proposals for local land charges ==
On 16 January 2014 HM Land Registry (which is responsible for the collation and maintenance of records of ownership and charges (mortgages) relating to land/property) has issued a press release informing of a project that it has undertaken for the past two years with a view to the taking over of the local land charges function from local authorities. The intention is to centralise the records in a digital and uniform format (which contrasts with the diverse formats utilised by the 348 local authorities in England and Wales) and to provide a single point of reference to fulfil the same function as the above-mentioned search reports.

== See also ==
- Conveyancing
- Planning permission
- Local government in the United Kingdom
- Radon
