= Continuando =

In old English law, "continuando" was a term used where a plaintiff would recover damages for several trespasses in the same action. For example, to avoid multiplicity of suits, an individual might in one action of trespass recover damages for forty or more trespasses; laying the first to be done, with a continuance to the whole time in which the rest of the trespasses were done.
