= Title search =

Process in real estate

In real estate business and law, a title search or property title search is the process of examining public records and retrieving documents on the history of a piece of real property to determine and confirm property's legal ownership, and find out what claims or liens are on the property. A title search is also performed when an owner wishes to sell mortgage property and the bank requires the owner to insure this transaction.

In the case of a prospective purchase, a title search is performed primarily to answer three questions regarding a property on the market:

- Does the seller have a saleable and marketable interest in the property?
- What kind of restrictions or allowances pertain to the use of the land? These would include real covenants, easements and other equitable servitudes.
- Do any liens exist on the property which need to be paid off at closing? These would be mortgages, back taxes, mechanic's liens, and other assessments.

Anyone may do a title search, with the right knowledge and resources, although the preparation of an abstract of title as part of a real-estate closing is often restricted to specifically licensed professionals or attorneys. Documents concerning conveyances of land are a matter of public record. These documents are maintained in hard copy paper format or sometimes scanned into image files. The information within the documents is typically not available as data format as the records are descriptions of legal events which contain terms, conditions, and language in excess of data. Within the United States, property deeds, deeds of trusts, easements, restrictive covenants, and other legal documents are often maintained electronically on a county-by county basis by a register of deeds, who is charged with accurately recording, maintaining, and updating records of real-estate conveyances.

== Typical process ==
Generally, there are two main types of title searching, a full coverage search and limited coverage search; other types include non-insured reports and foreclosure guarantee search.

It is often the case that people choose to contact a title company or attorney to conduct an exhaustive title search. The process of performing a title search involves accessing the official land records for the subject property. Each record is a document evidencing an event that occurred in the history of the property. A deed records an event of property transfer, mortgage documents the collateral interest of a home loan, and a lien documents a claim against the property in favor of another, such as a creditor, vendor, or tradesman. The objective of the title search is to establish clear, marketable title by exposing any outstanding claims prior to the transfer of title. The process of resolving any issues on the title is known as "clearing the title."

Each recorded document must name the parties involved, e.g., grantor and grantee. The grantor is the party transferring away a property right, and the grantee is receiving a property right. In the case of a deed, the grantor would typically be the property seller, and the grantee the buyer. A mortgage grantor or mortgagor is the borrower of the loan since they are giving away certain property rights to the mortgagee, lender, or mortgage grantee. More recent wording simplifies this language with "Borrower" and "Lender."

The records are kept in a centralized government office, usually at the county courthouse (in states with strong county governments such as Washington State or Massachusetts, the title on the door would be something like Registrar of Deeds or County Recorder); or in the municipal offices (in small states such as Connecticut, Vermont, and Rhode Island), often the title searcher must go to each individual town or county office to research the title.

The process of a title search begins with searching for and retrieving each physical document from the books which contain them. Every document is recorded by date in a special set of volumes called by various names such as Grantor-Grantee index, Land Records, or Deed Records, which may or may not be digitized or scanned into a searchable file, depending on the financial resources of the county or town. An official stamp located usually at the bottom of the first page gives the name of the recording official, date, time, book, and page number. If the document has been recorded, this stamp will always be there.

The collected documents are then reviewed and analyzed to see how each affects the property, and which documents have been released by subsequent recordings. Contingent conditions within documents such as life estates and remainder interests may exist within the document language. This process is often performed by a trained professional called a title abstractor. Some title abstractors have certifications documenting their experience level and training and successfully having passed an exam.

The document produced by a title abstractor is called a title abstract, or abstract of title. This is not a document that exists in public records, but it is derived from recorded documents. The title abstract is provided to the title company, attorney, or end-user by the abstractor.

For example, a title report may also show any easements, or recorded encumbrances against the property or portions of the property. A previous owner may have legally given a neighbor the right to share the driveway, or the city may have a right to strips of the property for putting power lines, communication lines, water pipes, or sewer pipes. A few online services offer title searches for relatively little cost, and their accuracy is not inferior to what a title company or attorney will offer; however online businesses rely mostly on electronically available information, and for that reason could at times be limited both in completeness and geographical availability.

=== Full coverage search ===
A full coverage search is usually done when creating a title report for sale/resale transactions and for transaction that involves construction loans. It generally includes searches related to property lien, easements, covenants, conditions and restrictions(CC&Rs), agreements, resolutions and ordinances that will affect the real property in question.

1. Search for liens against the owner and the other parties on title.
2. Search for liens against the buyer (for sale transactions only).
3. Search for Bankruptcy and Judgement proceedings against the owner of the property.
4. Search for liens against the buyer is not something that is covered in a title search.

=== Limited coverage search ===
A limited coverage search is usually making title reports for refinance transactions that involves ownership equity loans and for making simple title guarantee reports.

This kind of title searching usually includes searches for property liens, liens against the owner and the other parties on title and search for bankruptcy proceedings against the owner of the property.

== Title insurance ==
In the United States, the buyer of a property will usually purchase title insurance, which protects the buyer from any title problems that may arise after sale, such as liens that were missed during the title search. The title insurance company issues a report and an insurance policy in support of its findings. However, title searches are most often carried out before contracting is completed between parties, and sometimes during the escrow phase of a closing.

There are a variety of title searches which provide the customer with a report, but no insurance. These are for informational purposes only, and are called by a variety of names, such as Lot Book Report, Plat Certificate, 300-foot Radius Report, Ownership & Lien Report and others. These informational searches are used mainly in two instances:

- Ownership & Lien Report. Is informational, coming from examining the current owner's vesting deed forward and examining: owed taxes, new encumbrances on record, name searches on parties in title.
- Probate. This is when a family, lawyer, or court is dividing up the property of a deceased person. Heirs will want to know what liens they are taking on and who has rights to the land.
- Subdividing. To create a subdivision, a person takes land previously platted (legally named and recorded) under another name and renames and re-plats it as a new development or subdivision. A report must be given to the city, showing taxes and liens paid. The owner can then sell the lots individually or en masse, and may record Covenants, Conditions, and Restrictions, which govern how residents may construct their houses or yards, and may limit other activities. Many subdivisions have noise, pet, and trash regulations as well.

== Foreclosure guarantee search ==
A foreclosure guarantee is a type of report (e.g. trustees sale guarantee, judicial foreclosure guarantee and litigation guarantee) that is used mainly for foreclosing an encumbrance (or a lien) in a certain property. The title searcher will perform a full coverage search to the property in default and a search for the addresses of the lien holders to the property in default. The addresses will be used for sending copies of the notice of foreclosure letters (such as notice of trustees sale, etc.) to the lien holders to the property in default.

== Property title search before foreclosure sale ==
A home foreclosure is often linked with liens held by banks or governmental agencies. Multiple liens from various sources may be held against a property in foreclosure. If a home is sold at a foreclosure auction, the proceeds are divided and paid to lienholders in order of filing until all proceeds are expended.

Public auctions (also known as sheriff’s sales or foreclosure auctions) are typically held in the municipal or county courts, which neither guarantee an unencumbered title nor offer protection to buyers against additional liens on the property.

== See also ==
- Chain of title
- Title opinion
- Title (property)
- American Land Title Association (ALTA)
- Use of smart contracts in real estate transactions and title records
- Recorder of deeds
