= Chain of title =

Timeline of property ownership

A chain of title is the sequence of historical transfers of title to a property. It is a valuable tool to identify and document past owners of a property and serves as a property's historical ownership timeline. The "chain" runs from the present owner back to the original owner of the property. In situations where documentation of ownership is important, it is often necessary to reconstruct the chain of title. To facilitate this, a record of title documents may be maintained by a registry office or civil law notary.

== Chain of title for real property ==
Real estate is one field where the chain of title has considerable significance. In real estate transactions in the United States, insurance companies' issue title insurance based upon the chain of title to the property when it is transferred. Title insurance companies sometimes maintain private title plants that track real estate titles in addition to the official records. In other cases, the chain of title is established by an abstract of title, sometimes, although not always, certified by an attorney. In the United States, some holders of mortgage debt may be unable to establish chain of title, despite the fact that clear chain of title can be required by the mortgage holder before foreclosure can proceed. Widespread lack of clarity in chain of title results from a 1995 decision by many lenders to rely on a third entity—often, a specific company, Mortgage Electronic Registration Systems (MERS)--to hold title nominally, in an effort to enable the buying and selling of mortgage liabilities without registration of changes of ownership with local governments. US states have objected and even sued over this practice.

== Chain of title for copyrights, trademarks, and rights of publicity ==
In the motion picture industry, the chain of title involves the series of documentation which establishes proprietary rights in a film. The chain also applies to compilations in other fields, where many people have contributed to the project, thus acquiring authorship rights, or where materials were culled from many sources. Chain of title is extremely important to film purchasers and to film distributors, as it establishes the veracity of the owner's proprietary rights (or rights under license) in the intellectual property in a film, book or encyclopedia.

Chain of title documentation can include:

- copyright clearances on music from the regional collecting society, and to a less common extent, footage of other films;
- trademark clearances;
- talent agreements, which should incorporate a legal release from the talent, be they actors (including crowds), directors, cinematographers, choreographers, or others, to use their works, images, likeness and other personality rights in the film;
- proof of errors and omission insurance (a special form of insurance for motion picture producers which covers omissions in obtaining adequate chain of title).

Specialist organizations engage in the production of copyright property reports for motion picture studios, which cover original or unexploited works, and include the results of United States Copyright Office screening searches, author claimant searches, registration renewal searches and assignment searches. This involves reviewing US Copyright Office records from 1870 to present and numerous trade publications and databases, and Library of Congress records.

== See also ==
- Provenance
