= Title insurance =

Form of indemnity insurance

Title insurance is a form of indemnity insurance, predominantly found in the United States and Canada, that insures against financial loss from defects in title to real property and from the invalidity or unenforceability of mortgage loans. Unlike some land registration systems in countries outside the United States, US states' recorders of deeds generally do not guarantee indefeasible title to those recorded titles. For covered risks, title insurance must defend against a lawsuit attacking the title and/or reimburse the insured for the actual monetary loss incurred generally up to the dollar amount of insurance provided by the policy.

The first title insurance company, the Law Property Assurance and Trust Society, was formed in Pennsylvania in 1853. Typically the real property interests insured are fee simple ownership or a mortgage. However, title insurance can be purchased to insure any interest in real property, including an easement, lease, or life estate.

There are two general types of policies – owner and lender. Just as lenders require fire insurance and other types of insurance coverage to protect their loan, nearly all institutional lenders also require title insurance to protect their interest in the collateral of loans secured by real estate. Some mortgage lenders, especially non-institutional lenders, may not require title insurance. Nearly all buyers purchasing properties want title insurance as well.

A loan policy provides no coverage for the buyer/owner. For the buyer to obtain coverage, they must purchase an owner policy; it's independent of the lender's requirement, though commonly purchased together at a discounted simultaneous-issue rate.

Title insurance is available in many other countries, such as Canada, Australia, the United Kingdom, Mexico, New Zealand, Japan, China, South Korea, and throughout Europe. However, while a substantial number of properties located in these countries are insured by U.S. title insurers, they do not constitute a significant share of the real estate transactions in those countries. They also do not constitute a large share of U.S. title insurers' revenues. In many cases these are properties to be used for commercial purposes by U.S. companies doing business abroad, or properties financed by U.S. lenders. The U.S. companies involved buy title insurance to obtain the security of a U.S. insurer backing up the evidence of title that they receive from the other country's land registration system, and payment of legal defense costs if the title is challenged.

== History ==
Prior to the invention of title insurance, buyers in real estate transactions bore sole responsibility for ensuring the validity of the land title held by the seller. If the title were later deemed invalid or found to be fraudulent, the buyer lost his investment.

In 1868, the case of Watson v. Muirhead was heard by the Pennsylvania Supreme Court. Plaintiff Watson had lost his investment in a real estate transaction as the result of a prior lien on the property. Defendant Muirhead, the conveyancer, had discovered the lien prior to the sale but told Watson the title was clear after his lawyer had (erroneously) determined that the lien was not valid.

The courts ruled that Muirhead (and others in similar situations) was not liable for mistakes based on professional opinions. As a result, in 1874, the Pennsylvania legislature passed an act allowing for the incorporation of title insurance companies.

Joshua Morris, a conveyancer in Philadelphia, and several colleagues met on March 28, 1876, to incorporate the first title insurance company. The new firm, Real Estate Title Insurance Company of Philadelphia, would "insure the purchasers of real estate and mortgages against losses from defective titles, liens and encumbrances," and that "through these facilities, transfer of real estate and real estate securities can be made more speedily and with greater security than heretofore."

Morris' aunt purchased the first policy, valued at $1,500, to cover a home on North 43rd Street in Philadelphia.

== Purpose ==
There are two types of title systems used worldwide: Land registration and land recording.

Most of the industrialized world uses land registration systems for the transfer of land titles or interests in them. Under these systems, the government determines title ownership and encumbrances using its land registration; with only a few exceptions, the government's determination is conclusive. Governmental errors lead to monetary compensation to the person damaged by the error but that aggrieved party usually cannot recover the property. The Torrens title system is the basis for land registration systems in several common law countries. Nineteen jurisdictions in the United States, such as Minnesota and Massachusetts, adopted a form of this system between 1896 and 1917, however it fell out of favor after a single judgement in Imperial County, California, bankrupted the state's title indemnification fund, and the vast majority of U.S. states have opted for a system of document recording in which no governmental official makes any determination of who owns the title or whether the instruments transferring it are valid.

In the recording system, each time a land title transaction takes place, the parties record the transfer instrument with a local government recorder located in the jurisdiction (usually the county) where the land lies. The government indexes the instrument by the names of the grantor (transferor) and the grantee (transferee) and photographs it so any member of the public can find and examine it. If such a transaction goes unrecorded for any reason or length of time, an unscrupulous grantor could sell the property to another grantee. In many states, the grantee whose transaction is recorded first becomes the legal owner, and any other would-be buyers are left without recourse.

The advantage of the recording system is:

- In a registration system, the cost and risk are borne by the general public, but in a recording system, cost and risk are borne by the users of the system.
- In a recording system, an independent authority reviews government land transfers. In a registration system government can decide registration disputes in its favor, preventing separation of powers and the constitutional right to due process of law.
- A recording system can provide for conveyance of land for situations beyond the capacity of public records, such as homesteading and inheritance.
- A recording system combined with title insurance decentralizes records, creating redundancy. For example, when many records were destroyed in San Francisco's 1906 earthquake, out-of-town title companies maintained records that allowed landowners to prove ownership of their property.

Under this system, to determine who has title, one must:

- Examine the indexes in the recorders' offices, pursuant to various rules established by state legislatures and courts.
- Scrutinize the recorded instruments.
- Determine how they affect the title under applicable law. The final arbiters of title matters are the courts, which make decisions in suits brought by disagreeing parties. Historically, the person who wanted to understand the title would hire an abstractor to write a property abstract showing the chain of title. However, if the abstractor makes an error, the client may only be compensated if the attorney is negligent, subject to the limit of his financial responsibility (including his liability insurance). However, the willingness of these professionals to accept strict liability varies.

Title insurers conduct a title search on public records before they agree to insure the purchaser or mortgagee of land. Specifically, after a real estate sales contract has been executed and escrow opened, a title professional will search the public records to look for any problems with the home's title. This search typically involves a review of land records going back many years. More than one-third of all title searches reveal a title problem that title professionals will insist on fixing before the transaction closes. For instance, a previous owner may have had minor construction done on the property, but never fully paid the contractor (resulting in a mechanic's lien), or the previous owner may have failed to pay local or state taxes (resulting in a tax lien). Title professionals seek to resolve problems like these before the transaction closes, since otherwise, their employer, the title insurer, will be required to fix such title defects by paying such unpaid fees or taxes.

Title insurance policies are fairly uniform, and backed by statutory reserves, which is especially important in large commercial real estate transactions where the buyer and their lender have a large amount of money at stake. The insurer also pays for the defense of its insured in legal contests.

At least 20 U.S. states have experimented with Torrens title or other title registration systems at one time or another, but most have retreated to title recording under pressure from title insurers or from lack of interest. According to Karl Llewellyn, one Torrens title on one lot in New York City can render the entire block unavailable for large-scale improvement (i.e., skyscrapers); no lender will finance the purchase of such a lot because no New York title insurer will guarantee a Torrens title. The U.S. title insurance industry has successfully opposed land registration systems by saying that they are vulnerable to fraud (a severe problem in most land registration jurisdictions) and by contending that an inherently contingent property system more effectively protects property rights. Their contention is also that, while it is possible to fortify land registration systems to prevent the registration of forged deeds, the necessary countermeasures are complex and expensive. A 2007 book attacking the American title insurance "cartel" acknowledged that "[m]ore extensive use of Torrens certification would require setting up a special judicially supervised bureaucracy."

== Types of policies ==
Standardized forms of title insurance exist for owners and lenders. The lender's policies include a form specifically for construction loans, though this is rarely used today.

=== Owner's policy ===
The owner's policy assures a purchaser that the title to the property is vested in that purchaser and that it is free from all defects, liens and encumbrances except those listed as exceptions in the policy or are excluded from the scope of the policy's coverage. It also covers losses and damages suffered if the title is unmarketable. The policy also provides coverage for loss if there is no right of access to the land. Although these are the basic coverages, expanded forms of residential owner's policies exist that cover additional items of loss.

The liability limit of the owner's policy is typically the purchase price paid for the property. As with other types of insurance, coverages can also be added or deleted with an endorsement. There are many forms of standard endorsements to cover a variety of common issues. The premium for the policy may be paid by the seller or buyer as the parties agree. Usually a custom in a particular state or county on this matter reflects in most local real estate contracts. One should inquire about the cost of title insurance before signing a real estate contract that provides that he pay for title charges. A real estate attorney, broker, escrow officer (in the western states), or loan officer can provide detailed information as to the price of title search and insurance before the real estate contract is signed. Title insurance coverage lasts as long as the insured retains an interest in the land insured and typically no additional premium is paid after the policy is issued.

=== Lender's policy ===
This is sometimes called a loan policy and it is issued only to mortgage lenders. Generally speaking, it follows the assignment of the mortgage loan, meaning that the policy benefits the purchaser of the loan if the loan is sold. For this reason, these policies greatly facilitate the sale of mortgages into the secondary market. That market is made up of high volume purchasers such as Fannie Mae and the Federal Home Loan Mortgage Corporation as well as private institutions.

The American Land Title Association (ALTA) forms are almost universally used in the country though they have been modified in some states. In general, the basic elements of insurance they provide to the lender cover losses from the following matters:

1. The title to the property on which the mortgage is being made is either
  - Not in the mortgage loan borrower,
  - Subject to defects, liens or encumbrances, or
  - Unmarketable.
2. There is no right of access to the land.
3. The lien created by the mortgage:
  - is invalid or unenforceable,
  - is not prior to any other lien existing on the property on the date the policy is written, or
  - is subject to mechanic's liens under certain circumstances.

As with all of the ALTA forms, the policy also covers the cost of defending insured matters against attack.

Elements 1 and 2 are important to the lender because they cover its expectations of the title it will receive if it must foreclose its mortgage. Element 3 covers matters that will interfere with its foreclosure.

Of course, all of the policies except or exclude certain matters and are subject to various conditions.

There are also ALTA mortgage policies covering single or one-to-four family housing mortgages. These cover the elements of loss listed above plus others. Examples of the other coverages are loss from forged releases of the mortgage and loss resulting from encroachments of improvements on adjoining land onto the mortgaged property when the improvements are constructed after the loan is made.

=== Construction loan policy ===
In many states, separate policies exist for construction loans. Title insurance for construction loans require a Date Down endorsement that recognizes that the insured amount for the property has increased due to construction funds that have been vested into the property.

== Land title associations and standardized policies ==
In the United States, the American Land Title Association (ALTA) is a national non-profit trade association representing the interests of nearly 4,500 title insurance companies, title agents, independent abstracters, title searchers and attorneys across the United States. ALTA members conduct title searches, examinations, closings, and issue title insurance that protects real property owners and mortgage lenders against losses from defects in titles.

Founded in 1907, ALTA has created standard forms of title insurance policy "jackets" (standard terms and conditions) for Owners, Lenders and Construction Loan policies. ALTA forms are used in most, but not all, U.S. states. ALTA also offers special endorsement forms for the various policies; endorsements amend and typically broaden the coverage given under a basic title insurance policy. ALTA does not issue title insurance; it provides standardized policy and endorsement forms that most title insurers issue.

Some states, including Texas and New York, may mandate the use of forms of title insurance policy jackets and endorsements approved by the state insurance commissioner for properties located in those jurisdictions, but these forms are usually similar or identical to ALTA forms.

In addition to ALTA, the National Association of Independent Land Title Agents (NAILTA) is a national non-profit trade association that represents the interests of independent title insurance agents and independent real estate settlement professionals from across the United States. It was created by independent real estate settlement professionals to further the agenda of small business owners from within the title insurance, abstracting, surveying, and real estate community who lack representation at local, state and national levels. NAILTA is a national trade association that serves thousands of independent title and real estate professionals across the United States who collectively comprise over 60% of the national title insurance market, and identify themselves as independent settlement service providers. NAILTA represents the interests of those independent settlement service providers who serve over 31 million real estate purchase consumers per year, who close an estimated $514.8 billion's worth of refinance mortgages per year, and who collectively insure approximately $1.67 trillion in total national title insurance liability per year.

== Comparison with other forms of insurance ==
Title insurance differs in several respects from other types of insurance. Where most insurance is a contract where the insurer indemnifies or guarantees another party against a possible specific type of loss (such as an accident or death) at a future date, title insurance generally insures against losses caused by title problems that have their source in past events. This often results in the curing of title defects or the elimination of adverse interests from the title before a transaction takes place. Title insurance companies attempt to achieve this by searching public records to develop and document the chain of title and to detect known claims against or defects in the title to the subject property. If liens or encumbrances are found, the insurer may require that steps be taken to eliminate them (for example, obtaining a release of an old mortgage or deed of trust that has been paid off, or requiring the payoff, or satisfying involuntary liens such as abstracts of judgment and tax liens) before issuing the title policy. Title insurance companies also have the ability to discharge ancient mortgages under the Real Property Actions and Proceedings Law (RPAPL) in New York. Ancient mortgages are ones that are presumed to be satisfied or complete and have been for over 20 years. In the alternative, it may except from the policy's coverage those items not eliminated. Title plants are sometimes maintained to index the public records geographically, with the goal of increasing searching efficiency and reducing claims. In some states title plants are required to index the real-property records geographically and also maintain a name file for judgments, probates and other general matters.

The explanation above discloses another difference between title insurance and other types: title insurance premiums are not principally calculated on the basis of actuarial science, as is true in most other types of insurance. Instead of correlating the probability of losses with their projected costs, title insurance seeks to eliminate the source of the losses through the use of the recording system and other underwriting practices. As a result, a relatively small fraction of title insurance premiums are used to pay insured losses. The great majority of the premiums is used to finance the title research on each piece of property and to maintain the title plants used to efficiently do that research. There is significant social utility in this approach as the result conforms with the expectations of most property purchasers and mortgage lenders. Generally, they want the real estate they purchased or lent money on to have the title condition they expected when they entered the transaction, rather than money compensation and litigation over unexpected defects. This is not to say that title insurers take no actuarial risks. There are several matters that can affect the title to land that are not disclosed by the recording system but that are covered by the policies. Some examples are deeds executed by minors or mentally incompetent persons, forged instruments (in some cases), corporate instruments executed without the proper corporate authority and errors in the public records. However, historically, these problems have not amounted to a high percentage of the losses paid by the insurers. A more significant percentage of losses paid by the insurers are the result of errors and omissions in the title examining process itself.

== Homeowner's right to choose a title insurance company ==
In an April 2007 United States Government Accountability Office (GAO) Report on Title Insurance, the GAO recommended that state and federal legislators and regulators improve consumers ability to shop for title insurance based on price, encourage price competition, and ensure consumers are paying reasonable prices for title insurance.

A federal law called the Real Estate Settlement Procedures Act (RESPA) entitles an individual homeowner to choose a title insurance company when purchasing or refinancing residential property. Typically, homeowners do not make this decision for themselves and instead rely on their bank's or attorney's choice; however, the homeowner retains the right to choose a different insurer. RESPA makes it unlawful for any bank, broker, or attorney to mandate that a particular title insurance company be used. Doing so is a violation of federal law and any person or business doing so can be fined or lose its license.

Section 9 of RESPA prohibits a seller from requiring the buyer to use a particular title insurance company, either directly or indirectly, as a condition of sale. Buyers may sue a seller who violates this provision for an amount equal to three times all charges made for the title insurance. The only exception to this rule applies to commercial real estate transactions, which is not within the parameters of RESPA.

The new Loan Estimate form (LE) is the latest step taken by Department of Housing and Urban Development (HUD) to protect and assist consumers. In the past, lenders had provided potential borrowers with Good Faith Estimates (GFEs).

1. Lenders must issue the LE within three business days of loan application. However, many will provide the form to borrowers who are still in the shopping phase. Note that the LE provides more protections for consumers than a "worksheet" or "scenario" because lenders must by law adhere to its costs and indicate how long that rate and fee will be in effect.

If a loan originator does not provide the LE within three business days of receiving a completed loan application, it is in violation of Section 5 of RESPA. HUD provides the specific criteria for what constitutes a complete loan application:

- Borrower's name
- Borrower's monthly income
- Borrower's Social Security number (SSN) (to obtain a credit report)
- Property address
- The estimated value of the property
- Loan amount
- Anything else the lender deems necessary

2. The new LE is standardized

All lenders must provide consumers with the exact same document. Loan charges, third-party fees, and other costs must be displayed uniformly.

3. The new LE encourages consumers to shop

Since lenders are now required to issue a standardized LE in a specific time frame, consumers are provided an opportunity to compare lenders and their products. Further, HUD states that prior to the issuance of a LE, lenders can only charge potential borrowers a fee to cover the expense of a credit report. The relative low cost of credit reports ($15–30) results in consumers' ability to comparison shop many lenders at a minimal cost.

4. Lenders are accountable for their quotes

The new LE form puts the most important facts about a mortgage on the first page instead of burying them in small print throughout the form. This information includes:
- Loan amount, interest rate, and principal and interest payment.
- The existence of prepayment penalties, negative or balloon payments
- It alerts the borrower if the interest rate, loan balance or payment can increase during the loan's term
- Projected payments in future years, based on current financial indexes (mostly applies to adjustable rate mortgages (ARMs)
- Estimated escrows (also called impounds), which are payments for property taxes and homeowners insurance added to the monthly payment. the lender then pays these amounts on behalf of the borrower when they come due
- Total closing costs and cost to close (how much the borrower must bring to the closing)

5. At the closing, lenders must issue a Closing Disclosure (CD) disclosing the actual costs. The borrower can compare the actual costs to the estimated costs. Costs fall into several categories, and differences between the actual and estimated costs are treated accordingly:

a. 0% Tolerance. If at the closing, any item in the 0% Tolerance category is higher on the corresponding section of the CD compared to the original LE, the lender is responsible for covering the difference.
b. 10% Tolerance. Unlike the 0% Tolerance category, these items are not compared individually to their corresponding section in the CD. Instead, all items in the category are aggregated on the LE and compared to the aggregated corresponding items on the CD. In the event that the CD has a total more than 10% higher than the total on the LE, the lender is responsible for any expense in excess of the 10% increase. This means that individual items in the 10% Tolerance category may increase more than 10% from the LE to the CD without a penalty to the lender, as long as the sum of all the items does not increase more than 10%.
c. No Tolerance. A few sections of the new LE fall into the No Tolerance category. These quotes can change with no penalty to the lender.
Again, depending on the state, region, and vendor, homeowners can save substantial money by shopping around for title insurance except in some states, such as Texas, in which the rates are codified by law. In light of the changes made by RESPA and those to the LE, notable consumer and business publications have featured articles about the benefits of shopping around for title insurance, such as The Wall Street Journal, Kiplinger's Personal Finance, HSH.com, Forbes.com, and The New York Times.

== Affiliated business arrangements ==
Sometimes, several businesses that offer settlement services are owned or controlled by a common corporate parent. These businesses are known as "affiliates", while the relationship is called an affiliated business arrangement (ABA).

When a lender, real estate broker, or other participant refers his homebuyer to an affiliate for a settlement service (such as when a real estate broker refers his homebuyer to a mortgage broker affiliate), the law requires the referring party to provide an affiliated business arrangement disclosure. This disclosure informs homebuyers they are not required to use the affiliate and are free to shop for other providers.

Despite advances in technology that allow homebuyers to shop for title services, many homebuyers remain unaware that they may select their own title insurance or settlement company.

A recent survey from the Ohio Association of Independent Title Agents (OAITA), conducted from 2009 through 2010, showed when homebuyers are made fully aware of ABAs, they become uncomfortable and prefer a title company or title agent to be a third party (i.e., independent) to the transaction.

While 77% of respondents did not independently select their settlement company, when made fully aware of the ABA relationships 50% of respondents said they prefer a title company that does not share profits with a referral source compared to 6% of respondents saying they prefer a title agent that shares profits with a referral source. Further, 58% of respondents said they believe that ABAs are a conflict of interest.

The OAITA stands in stark contrast to two Harris Interactive surveys used by the Real Estate Services Providers Council in a January 2011 meeting with Federal Reserve staff to claim that homebuyers were more satisfied with the ABA settlement service providers.

- A 2002 study used by the proponents revealed that 64% of homebuyers who used "one-stop shopping" programs had a better overall experience with their home purchase transaction.
- A 2008 study revealed that homebuyers who used "one-stop shopping" in their latest real estate transaction were more satisfied with their home buying experience compared to those who used services of multiple providers.

Organizations such as the National Association of Independent Land Title Agents seek to restore transparency and credibility to the land title process and to preserve an objective and impartial role at the closing table to improve the consumer experience, by addressing the proliferation of controlled business arrangements and eliminating conflicts of interest between title agents and their referral sources, as well as between all real estate settlement service providers and their sources of business.

== Cost of title insurance ==
The cost of title insurance has two components: premium charges and service fees.

Title insurance premium rates are based on five cost considerations, including those related to:

1. Maintaining current title information on property local to that operation, i.e., title plant
2. Searching and examining the title to subject properties
3. Resolving or clearing defects to title
4. Covering title defects
5. Allowing for a reasonable profit

=== Premium charges ===
Like the rates for other forms of insurance, rates for title insurance usually are regulated by state governments to ensure that premiums are not excessive, inadequate or unfairly discriminatory to the public. States have different methods of regulating title insurance rates. The types of rate regulation used include:

- Promulgation: State regulatory body sets the rates. An example is Texas, where rates are set after comprehensive hearings each year.
- Prior approval: Insurers propose rates, which must be reviewed formally and approved explicitly or deemed approved by the regulatory body before they can be charged.
- File and use: Insurers set rates, but they cannot be charged until the regulator has been notified and allowed time to review and action, if necessary. In some prior-approval states, almost the same result is achieved through a so-called deemer provision. Under a deemer, rates proposed by insurers are deemed approved if the regulatory body takes no action to disapprove a filing within a specified time, and the filer notifies the state that the rates are being deemed approved.
- Use and file: Insurers set rates that can be charged immediately, as long as the new rate schedule is filed with the regulatory body.
- No direct rate regulation: Insurers set rates that can be changed at an insurer's discretion. Even in this apparent unregulated situation, a regulatory body still is charged with overseeing the title insurance industry and can question the propriety of a rate that appears to be unfairly discriminatory or otherwise violates statutory standards. Examples are Illinois, Georgia and Massachusetts.

The rates may include discounts if title insurance is ordered within a specified time after the last policy issued or if the mortgage being insured is a refinance of an earlier mortgage. In the states employing any of these regulations, it is illegal for title insurance companies to charge a higher or lower rate than the regulated rate.

For example: In Pennsylvania there are two rates, basic rate and reissue rate. The basic rate would apply if it has been more than ten years since the last policy was issued. If less than ten years, the reissue rate applies. The reissue rate offers a discount of approximately ten percent off of the basic rate. If the transaction is a refinance, the savings can be as much as thirty percent off of the reissue rate. These rates and applicable discounts are filed with and approved by the Pennsylvania Insurance Commission.

Title insurance is substantially different from other lines of insurance because it emphasizes risk prevention rather than risk assumption. This means the majority of the premium dollar, about 80 percent, covers the work performed by title professionals, such as the search examination, curative work, policy issuance and, frequently, the settlement or closing. The remaining 20 percent covers the insurance policy, a significant portion of which is put into reserves for claims that could occur 10 or 20 years in the future. According to a 2006 survey by ALTA, title problems that required curative action were found in 36 percent of all residential real estate transactions in 2005. This was up from 25 percent in 2000, due to the booming real estate market and an increase in transactions.

=== Service fees ===
In some states, the regulated premium charge does not include part of the underwriting costs necessary for the process. In those states, title insurers may also charge search or abstracting fees for searching the public records, or examination fees to compensate them for the title examination. These fees are usually not regulated and in those cases may sometimes be negotiated. In some states, regulation requires that the title insurer base its policy on the opinion of an attorney. The attorney's fees are not regulated. They are also not part of the title insurance premium, though the title insurer may include those fees within its invoice as a convenience to the attorney rendering the opinion. Similarly, fees for closing a sale or mortgage transaction are not regulated in most states though the charge for closing may appear in the invoice disclosing the total charges for the transaction.

== Industry profitability ==
The title industry is highly dependent on real estate markets, which, in turn, are highly sensitive to mortgage interest rates and the overall economic well-being. During the housing bubble from 2000 through 2006, the industry's revenue more than doubled. As the surge in real estate transactions drove up title insurance revenue—along with a greater incidence of claims—the economic downturn that started in 2007 pared back revenue significantly for several years. To compare, the industry reported nearly $17 billion in title insurance premiums in 2005, but volume fell to $9.6 billion in 2009.

In 2012, according to ALTA, the industry paid out about $908 million in claims, about 8.1% of the $11.2 billion taken in as premiums. By comparison, the boiler insurance industry, which like title insurance requires an emphasis on inspections and risk analysis, pays 25% of its premiums in claims. As mentioned above, professionals in the land title industry seek to prevent claims through up-front preventive measures before a policy is issued and therefore the industry's claims ratio is different from other lines of insurance.

According to the statutory accounting rules for title insurance, only reported claims are reflected in the loss expense, while in other lines—both reported and unreported claims are included in the loss expense. As a result, timing differences occur in the reporting of losses and loss-adjustment expenses for title insurance when compared to other lines. In addition, title insurance, unlike most other property/casualty exposures, has no termination date and no time limitation on filing claims.

In many states, the price of title insurance is regulated by a state insurance commission. In these states, the title insurance companies lobby state legislators and other politicians and donate to their campaigns, in the hopes of maintaining high rates. Unlike other forms of insurance (such as life, medical, or home owners), title insurance is not paid for annually, as it has one payment for the term of the policy, which is in effect until the property is resold or refinanced.

== Relative market share among U.S. title insurers ==
The following discloses the relative 2012 market shares among the four U.S. national families of title insurers (Fidelity National Financial, First American, Stewart, and Old Republic), and the regional companies, i.e., those not affiliated with the national families.

Market share 2012
| Family | Share |
|---|---|
| Fidelity National Financial | 33.86% |
| First American Corporation | 26.34% |
| Old Republic National Title Insurance Company | 13.53% |
| Stewart Title Guaranty Company | 12.95% |
| Regional companies | 13.32% |
| Total | 100.00% |
Source: American Land Title Association

As of January 2009, Fidelity National Financial held the highest market share, due to its acquisition of LandAmerica's Commonwealth Land Title, Lawyers Title, and United Capital Title units subsequent to LandAmerica's declaration of bankruptcy.
