= Feudalism in England =

English feudalism

Feudalism as practised in the Kingdom of England during the medieval period was a system of political, military, and socio-economic organisation based on land tenure. Designed to consolidate power and direct the wealth of the land to the king while providing military service to his causes, feudal society was structured around hierarchical relationships involving land ownership and obligations. These landholdings were known as fiefs, fiefdoms, or fees.

== Origins ==
The word feudalism was not a medieval term but was coined by sixteenth-century French and English lawyers to describe certain traditional obligations among members of the warrior aristocracy. It did not become widely used until 1748, when Montesquieu popularized it in De L'Esprit des Lois ("The Spirit of the Laws").

The term feudal derives from the ancient Gothic word faihu, meaning "property"—originally referring to "cattle"—which is cognate with the classical Latin word pecus, meaning "cattle," "money," or "wealth."

European feudalism had its roots in the Roman manorial system, in which workers, known as coloni, lived on large estates and received protection in exchange for labor. It also developed in the 8th century CE in the Kingdom of the Franks, where kings granted land as benefices—temporary land grants—to reward loyal nobles in exchange for service.

=== Anglo-Saxon feudal structures ===
Following the end of Roman rule in Britain, a form of feudalism emerged during the subsequent Anglo-Saxon period, though it was not as comprehensive or uniform as the system that developed in the later Norman era.

During the Heptarchy and the unified English kingdom after King Athelstan, Anglo-Saxon kings often granted land to their supporters and nobles in exchange for military service. These landholders were typically thegns, warriors who controlled land and served the king when called upon. Similarly, ealdormen governed counties or groups of counties and were appointed by the king, providing military support when required.

Surviving Anglo-Saxon writs document specific land grants made by monarchs to the nobility across England. Thegns frequently worked alongside ealdormen and shire reeves to enforce law, maintain order, and collect taxes within their territories. This system, indigenous to the Anglo-Saxons, bore similarities to European feudalism of the time. Armies raised for conflicts were drawn from such arrangements, including the force assembled for Æthelstan's invasion of Scotland in the 930s. Likewise, the English army at the Battle of Hastings in 1066 followed a similar structure. However, the Norman victory resulted in the widespread displacement of the native English nobility.

A key distinction between Anglo-Saxon and Norman feudalism was that the former relied on traditional Germanic ties between the king and his nobles, rather than the structured, hierarchical model influenced by the Franks and employed by the Normans.

By 1066, England consisted of a patchwork of lands owned by thegns and ealdormen. However, following the Norman Conquest, the Anglo-Saxon nobility steadily lost their lands. The Domesday Book frequently recorded the original English landowners before the Conquest, including native lords and King Edward the Confessor himself.

== Classic English feudalism ==
Feudalism took root in England following William of Normandy's conquest in 1066. Over a century earlier, before the full unification of England, the seven smaller kingdoms that made up the Heptarchy had maintained an unstable relationship of raids, ransoms, and truces with Viking groups from Denmark and Normandy between the seventh and tenth centuries. This instability weakened the region, but England had largely unified under the House of Wessex by the early 10th century. The successful Norman Conquest in 1066 led to the introduction of a more structured feudal system, with William I granting land to his vassals—loyal knights and nobles who had fought alongside him—to help maintain control over the newly conquered kingdom.

The feudal system of governance and economics dominated England throughout the High Middle Ages, creating a society in which the nobility and landowning elite prospered while the majority of the population labored on the land with limited opportunities for economic autonomy or political representation. In the Late Middle Ages, feudalism began to decline with the gradual centralization of government, a process that accelerated in the early fourteenth century. The system remained in decline until its formal abolition in England under the Tenures Abolition Act 1660. By that time, significant socio-economic class divisions had taken root, paving the way for the expansion of capitalism as the British Empire developed.

Under the English feudal system, the king (asserting his allodial right) was considered the sole absolute "owner" of land. All nobles, knights, and other tenants, known as vassals, merely "held" land from the king, who occupied the highest tier of the "feudal pyramid." Feudal land grants varied in duration: those granted indefinitely or heritably were classified as freehold, while fixed-term or non-heritable grants were considered non-freehold. Even freehold fiefs were not automatically inherited—before taking possession, an heir was required to pay a feudal relief.

Directly below the king in the feudal hierarchy were the tenants-in-chief (typically barons or knights), who held large estates and profited from the land. Beneath them were mesne lords (often knights or lower-ranking barons), who received land from the tenants-in-chief and could, in turn, sublease it to lesser vassals through a process called subinfeudation. This tiered system created a complex and interwoven feudal hierarchy that defined landownership and governance in medieval England.

== Fall of English feudalism ==
English feudalism began to decline during the Anarchy (1135–1153), a civil war between the supporters of Empress Matilda and Stephen of Blois. Matilda, the daughter of Henry I of England, was Henry's only legitimate heir, but many barons who had sworn to support her claim instead backed Stephen, Henry's nephew. This division led to prolonged conflict and a weakened central authority. Although a compromise was eventually reached—resulting in the ascension of Matilda's son, Henry II of England—England continued to experience the repercussions of the war for years.

A significant step in the decline of feudalism came on 15 June 1215, when King John of England was compelled by rebellious barons to affix his seal to Magna Carta. This document limited the king's power and established principles that gradually eroded the foundations of the feudal hierarchy. In the mid-13th century, Simon de Montfort, 6th Earl of Leicester played a crucial role in the development of English parliamentary governance by establishing what became the House of Commons of England alongside the House of Lords.

Another major blow to the feudal system came with the Black Death in England (1347–1351), which drastically reduced the population and created a labour shortage. With fewer peasants available to work the land, wages rose as labour became more valuable. In response, the government enacted the Statute of Labourers 1351, which attempted to freeze wages at pre-plague levels and restrict peasant mobility. However, this led to widespread discontent, culminating in uprisings such as the Peasants' Revolt of 1381.

During the revolt, the teenage king Richard II of England initially met with the rebels and appeared to concede to their demands. However, after the revolt was suppressed, many of its leaders were executed. Despite this, the uprising demonstrated that peasants were no longer willing to accept the rigid servitude imposed by the feudal system. Over the following centuries, as economic structures shifted and centralised government gained strength, feudalism in England continued to erode, eventually giving way to a more modern economy and social order.

== Vassalage ==
Before a lord (or king) could grant land (a fief) to a tenant, he first had to make that person a vassal. This was done through a formal and symbolic ceremony called a commendation ceremony, consisting of two key acts: homage and the oath of fealty. During homage, the lord and vassal entered into a contract in which the vassal pledged military service and loyalty to the lord, while the lord, in turn, promised protection—a critical safeguard in a society lacking a centralized police force and operating under a rudimentary justice system.

Once sworn, the contract was considered binding and could not be broken lightly. The oath was often taken on a relic, such as a saint's bone, or on a copy of the Gospel, underscoring its solemnity. The ceremony was further emphasized by the vassal clasping his hands between the lord's while reciting the oath. A ceremonial kiss sometimes sealed the agreement, though it was less significant than the rituals of homage and fealty.

The term fealty comes from the Latin fidelitas, meaning fidelity, and referred to the vassal's sworn loyalty to his feudal lord. The oath of fealty reinforced the commitments made during homage, formally establishing the mutual obligations between lord and vassal. The vassal's primary duty was military service. Using the resources provided by his fief, the vassal was expected to supply armor, weapons, horses, and provisions to fulfill his military obligations when summoned by his lord.

The specifics of the military service—such as its duration and the number of knights or soldiers required—were typically agreed upon in advance. Wealthier vassals, such as barons with extensive landholdings, had greater obligations, as they could afford to provide and equip a larger retinue of knights. Because knights needed horses, armor, weapons, and supplies to sustain themselves and their attendants for the duration of their service, fulfilling these obligations could be highly expensive.

Military service was the primary reason for the feudal relationship, but vassals also had additional duties, including attendance at their lord's court. Depending on their rank, vassals were required to serve at the manorial, baronial, or royal court—such as the Parliament of England. This duty involved providing counsel, meaning that if the lord faced an important decision, he would summon his vassals for advice. At the manorial level, this could involve agricultural management, while at higher levels, it could include acting as jurors in legal matters, even cases involving capital punishment. In the king's feudal court—the precursor to parliament—such deliberations could extend to matters of war and governance.

Feudal customs varied over time and by region. For more details, see Examples of feudalism.

== Varieties of feudal tenure ==
Under the feudal system several different forms of land tenure existed, each effectively a contract with differing rights and duties attached thereto. The main varieties are as follows:

=== Military tenure ===
Freehold (Indeterminate & Hereditable):

- By barony (per baroniam) – This form of tenure constituted the holder as a feudal baron and was the highest degree of tenure. It imposed military service obligations. Over time, barons were differentiated into greater and lesser barons, with only greater barons being guaranteed the right to attend Parliament. All such holders were necessarily tenants-in-chief of the Crown.
- By knight-service – Ranking below tenure by barony, this form of tenure also required military service, though to a lesser extent. It could be held in capite directly from the king or as a mesne tenancy under a tenant-in-chief.
- By castle-guard – A specialized form of military service in which the tenant was required to guard a designated castle for a specified number of days per year.
- By scutage – A tenure in which the military service obligation had been commuted to monetary payments. This became increasingly common during the decline of the feudal era, marking a transition from personal military service to financial contributions in lieu of service.

=== Non-military tenure ===
Freehold (Indeterminate & Hereditable):

- By serjeanty – This form of tenure was granted in return for performing specific services for the king in a non-military capacity. When the service was of a ceremonial or honorary nature, it was termed grand serjeanty, whereas more practical or menial service was classified as petty serjeanty.
- By frankalmoin – A tenure generally restricted to clerics, under which land was granted to religious institutions in return for spiritual services, such as prayers for the grantor's soul, rather than military or financial obligations.

Non-Freehold (Fixed-Term & Non-Hereditable):

- By copyhold – A form of tenure where rights and duties were determined by the customs of the lord of the manor. The terms were recorded in the manorial court roll, providing a formal record of the tenant's obligations and privileges.
- By socage – The lowest form of free tenure, involving payment of rent in money or produce instead of military service. Socage tenures eventually became the basis for modern land ownership systems.

== See also ==
- Bastard feudalism
- Cestui que
- Charter of Liberties
- Chivalry
- Concordat of Worms
- English feudal barony
- Feudal Lords (play-by-mail game)
- Gentry
- Landed property
- Majorat
- Manorialism
- Medieval demography
- Middle Ages
- Nulle terre sans seigneur
- Quia Emptores
- Sark
- Serfdom
- Statutes of Mortmain
- Knights
- Medieval warfare
- Fengjian – China
- Indian feudalism

== References and sources ==
Sources

- Encyclopædia Britannica, 9th. ed. vol. 9, pp. 119–123, "Feudalism"
