= History of English land law =

Law of real property in England

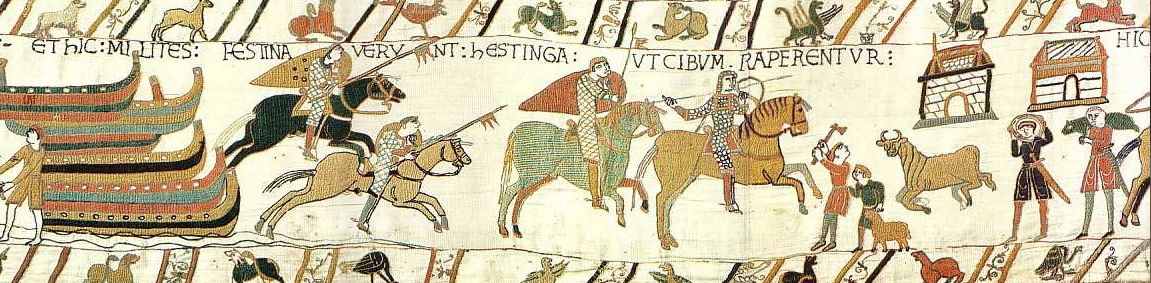
The Bayeux Tapestry depicts William the Conqueror's knights seizing food from English peasants. The Domesday Book of 1086 recorded at least 12% of people as free, 30% as villeins, 35% as servient bordars and cottars, and 9% as slaves.

The history of English land law can be traced back to Roman times. Throughout the Early Middle Ages, where England came under rule of post-Roman chieftains and Anglo-Saxon monarchs, land was the dominant source of personal wealth. English land law transformed further from the Anglo-Saxon days, particularly during the post-Norman Invasion feudal encastellation and the Industrial Revolution. As the political power of the landed aristocracy diminished, modern legislation increasingly made land a social form of wealth, subject to extensive social regulation such as for housing, national parks and agriculture.

== Roman law ==
The division into real and personal is coincident to a great extent with that into immovable and movable, generally used by systems of law founded on the Roman (see Personal Property.) That it is not entirely coincident is due to the influence of the Roman law itself. The Greeks and the Romans of the republic were essentially nations of citizens; the Teutons were essentially a nation of land-folk; the Roman Empire bridged the gulf between the two.

== Anglo-Saxon law ==
It is probable that the English land law was produced by the action of the policy adopted in the lower empire, finally developed into feudalism, upon the previously existing course of Teutonic custom. The distinguishing features of the Teutonic system were enjoyment in common and the absence of private ownership, except to a limited extent. The principal features of the old English land law before the Conquest, from which the modern law has developed, were:

1. Liberty of alienation, either by will or inter vivos, of such land as could be alienated, chiefly, if not entirely, bocland, subject always to the limits fixed by the boc;
2. Publicity of transfer by enrolment in the shire-book or church-book;
3. Equal partition of the estate of a deceased among the sons, and failing sons among the daughters;
4. Cultivation to a great extent by persons in various degrees of serfdom owing money or labour rents;
5. Variety of custom, tending to become uniform through the application of the same principles in the local courts;
6. Subjection of land to the Trinoda necessitas, a burden imposed for the purpose of defence of the realm.

The rudiments of the conceptions of tenure and of the Crown as lord paramount were found in the old English system, and England was an anticipation of the limited interests which afterwards became of such importance.

Such terms as "fee" or "homage" derive from feudal times. Rights of common and distress are based upon still older institutions, forming the very basis of primitive law. The conception of tenure is the fundamental ground of distinction between real and personal estate, the former only being strictly entitled to the name of estate.

== Norman feudalism ==
The formal start of an English law of real property came after the Norman Invasion of 1066 when a common law was built throughout England. The new king, William the Conqueror, started standardising England's feudal rules, and compiled a reference for all land and its value in the Domesday Book of 1086. This was used to determine taxes, and the feudal dues that were to be paid. Feudalism meant that all land was held by the monarch. Estates in land were granted to lords, who in turn parcelled out property to tenants. Tenants and lords had obligations of work, military service, and payment of taxation to those up the chain, and ultimately to the Crown. Most of the peasantry were bonded to their masters. Serfs, cottars or slaves, who may have composed as much as 88% of the population in 1086, were bound by law to work on the land. They could not leave without permission of their Lords. But also, even those who were classed as free men were factually limited in their freedom, by the limited chances to acquire property. The Commons Act 1236 allowed the Lord of a Manor to enclose any manorial land that had previously been common, and the Statute of Westminster 1285 formalised the system of entail so that land would only pass to the heirs of a landlord. The Statute Quia Emptores Terrarum 1290 allowed alienation of land only by substitution of the title holder, halting creation of further sub-tenants. The civil liberties of the Magna Carta of 1215, and its reissue in 1297, were only meant for barons and lords, while the vast majority of people were poor, subjugated and dispossessed.

=== Breakdown of serfdom ===
... since sin was the initial cause of servitude, then it must be the case that, when this entire world was in sin, then this entire world was also in servitude and thraldom. But with the arrival of the Age of Grace, God ordained that some folk should be of higher degree than others and have authority over them, others should be of lower degree and obey their lord, but all of them properly served in his estate and in his degree. And therefore, in some countries, where slaves can be purchased, if they can be persuaded to become Christians they are set free. And it can certainly be said that a lord and his servants each owe something to the other.

— G Chaucer, The Canterbury Tales (1400) The Parson's Tale, §68

Feudalism had not always been a part of English society, rather than being positively imposed by the monarchs prior to the Norman Invasion. However, from 1348 everything changed as the Black Death swept through Europe, killing a third of the population. People like the poet Geoffrey Chaucer had seen subservience as part of a natural social order, ordained by God. But if landowners had themselves survived the plague, the peasants' labour on the land had become very scarce. Ironically, the surviving peasants were in a greater position of economic power, in claims or bargaining for wages. Feudalism began to break down. First, serfs could undergo "commutation", where the lord simply agreed to accept money rents from tenants instead of labour services. This did not mean freedom itself, but abandoning forced labour and payments in kind to landlords meant the open evidence of servility was concealed. In disputes, royal courts were increasingly biased toward declaring a peasant was free. Second, through an act of manumission lords could voluntarily grant freedom and this was increasingly done, after the plague, if the serf or a relative made a payment of money. Third, the common law stated that if a serf lived on free soil, as in a chartered town or Royal demesne land, for a year and a day, they would become free. The nobility and the King reacted to the rising bargaining power of the peasantry by fixing wages and violently suppressing any uprisings, like the Peasants' Revolt in 1381. Yet this combination of factors, slowly but surely, meant that by 1485 just one percent of the population were left in bondage. Formal subservience was increasingly seen as a social scar. In 1523 Justice Anthony Fitzherbert wrote that the remainder of bondmen was "the greatest inconvenience that now is suffred by the lawe".

=== Feudal tenures ===
By the time of the Norman Conquest, elements of feudalism existed in England from the rule of the Anglo-Saxon and Danish kings to the degree that it was easy to introduce it in full. What the Norman Conquest did was not to change all at once allodial into feudal tenure, but to complete the association of territorial with personal dependence in a state of society already prepared for it. Nulle terre sans seigneur was one of the fundamental axioms of feudalism. There might be any number of infeudations and subinfeudations to mesne lords, but the chain of seigniory was complete, depending in the last resort upon the king as lord paramount. Land was not owned by free owners owing only necessary militia duties to the state, but was held of the king by knight-service. The folkland became the king's land; the soldier was a landowner instead of the landowner being a soldier. Free owners tended to become tenants of the lord, the township to be lost in the manor. The common land became in law the waste of the manor, its enjoyment resting upon a presumed grant by the lord. On the other hand, the whole of England did not become manorial; the conflict between the township and the manor resulted in a compromise, the result of which affects land tenure in England to this day. But it was a compromise much to the advantage of the privileged class, for in England more than in any other country the land law is the law of the nobility and not of the people. One reason of this is that, as England was never so completely feudalized as were some of the European continental states, the burden of feudalism was not so severely felt, and has led to less agitation for reform.

The land forfeited to the Conqueror was re-granted by him to be held by knight-service due to the king, not to the mesne lord as in European continental feudalism. In 1086 at the council of Salisbury all the landholders swore fealty to the crown. In the full vigour of feudalism the inhabitants of England were either free or not free. The free inhabitants held their lands either by free tenure or by a tenure which was originally that of a non-free inhabitant, but attached to land in the possession of a free man. Free tenure was either military tenure, called also tenure in chivalry, or socage (including burgage and petit serjeanty), or frankalmoin, by which ecclesiastical corporations generally held their land. The non-free inhabitants were called in the Domesday Book servi, cotarii, or bordarii, and later nativi or villani, the last name being applied to both free men and serfs. All these were in a more or less dependent condition. The free tenures all exist at the present day, though, as will appear later, the military tenures have shrunk into the unimportant and exceptional tenure of grand serjeanty. The non-free tenures were to a certain extent represented by copyhold in later centuries until final abolition in 1925.

The most important difference between the military and socage tenures was the mode of descent. Whether or not a feudal benefice was originally hereditary, it had certainly become so at the time of the Conquest, and it descended to the eldest son. This applied at once in England to land held by knight-service as far as regarded the capital fief. The descent of socage lands or lands other than the capital fief for some time followed the old pre-Conquest rule of descent. Thus, in the so-called "Laws of Henry I", the lands other than the capital fief and some socage lands were divided among all the sons equally. But by the time of Henry de Bracton the course of descent of lands held by knight-service had so far prevailed that if there was no evidence either way descent to the eldest son was presumed. Relics of the old custom still remain in the case of gavelkind. The military tenant was subject to the feudal incidents, from which the tenant in socage was exempt. These additional fees and obligations were often oppressive. Alienation of lands by will, except in a few favoured districts, became impossible; alienation inter vivos was restrained in one direction in the interests of the heir, in another in the interests of the lord. At the time of Glanvill a tenant had a greater power of alienation over land which he had purchased than over land which he had inherited. But by the time of Bracton the heir had ceased to have any interest in either kind of land. The lords were more successful. It was enacted by Magna Carta that a free man should not give or sell so much of his land as to leave an amount insufficient to perform his services to his lord. In spite of this provision, the rights of the lords were continually diminished by subinfeudation until the passing of the Statute of Quia Emptores. Alienation by a tenant-in-chief of the crown without licence was a ground of forfeiture until 1327, when a fine was substituted.

The influence of local custom upon the land law must have become weakened after the circuits of the judges of the King's Court were established by Henry II. Jurisdiction over litigation touching the freehold was taken away from the lord's courts in 1392.

The common law as far as it dealt with real estate had in the main assumed its present aspect by the reign of Henry III. The changes which have been made since that date have been chiefly due to the action of equity and legislation, the latter sometimes interpreted by the courts in a manner very different from the intention of parliament. The most important influence of equity has been exercised in mortgage and trusts in the doctrine of specific performance of contracts concerning real estate, and in relief from forfeiture for breach of covenant.

=== Medieval conveyancing ===
The reign of Edward I is notable for three leading statutes, all passed in the interests of the superior lords. The 1279 the Statute of Mortmain (7 Edw. 1) was the first of a long series directed against the acquisition of land by religious and charitable corporations. In 1285 the statute De Donis Conditionalibus (13 Edw. 1. c. 1) forbade the alienation of estates granted to a man and the heirs of his body, which before the statute usually became on the birth of an heir at once alienable, and so the lord lost his escheat. The statute Quia Emptores (18 Edw. 1. c. 1) preserved those rights of the lords which were up to that time subject to be defeated by subinfeudation, by enacting that in any alienation of lands the alienee should hold them of the same lord of the fee as the alienor. Since 1290 it has been impossible to create an estate in fee simple to be held of a mesne lord, or to reserve a rent upon a grant of an estate in fee (unless in the form of a rent-charge), or to create a new manor. The statute, however, does not bind the crown. The practical effect of the statute was to make the transfer of land thenceforward more of a commercial and less of a feudal transaction. The writ of elegit was introduced by the Statute of Westminster II in 1285 as a creditor's remedy over real estate. It has, however, been considerably modified by subsequent legislation.

From 1290 to the reign of Henry VIII, there is no statute of the first importance dealing with real estate. The reign of Henry VIII, like that of Edward I, is signalized by three acts, the effects of which continue to this day. The one which has had the most lasting influence in law is the Statute of Uses, intended to provide against secrecy of sales of land. As a necessary sequel, the Statute of Enrolments required all bargains and sales of land be duly enrolled. Bargain and sale was a form of equitable transfer which had for some purposes superseded the common law feoffment. It applied only to estates of inheritance and not to terms of years. The unforeseen effect of the Enrolment of Bargains of Lands, etc. Act 1535 (27 Hen. 8. c. 16) was to establish as the ordinary form of conveyance until 1841 the conveyance by lease and release. Uses having become legal estate by the Statute of Uses, and therefore no longer devisable, the Statute of Wills (32 Hen. 8. c. 1) (explained by the Wills Act 1542) (34 & 35 Hen. 8. c. 5) was passed to remedy this inconvenience. At least as late as 1911, it remained law as to wills made before 1838.

== Reformation ==
After feudalism had broken down, and the number of serfs had dwindled, the law saw more and more people as being formally free from a landlord. However people's de facto freedom was still constrained because they had no property themselves.

=== Enclosures ===
"... your sheep, which are naturally mild, and easily kept in order, may be said now to devour men and unpeople, not only villages, but towns; for wherever it is found that the sheep of any soil yield a softer and richer wool than ordinary, there the nobility and gentry, and even those holy men, the abbots not contented with the old rents which their farms yielded, nor thinking it enough that they, living at their ease, do no good to the public, resolve to do it hurt instead of good. They stop the course of agriculture, destroying houses and towns, reserving only the churches, and enclose grounds that they may lodge their sheep in them."

— T More, Utopia (1516)

More landlords were enclosing pastures that had been open for commoners to use, and destroying people's houses, especially for sheep farming. The crown, and Lord Chancellors like Sir Thomas More, had opposed this to some extent, with a series of anti-enclosure acts from 1489. These required that any houses destroyed be rebuilt, but if not half the additional profits would go to the Crown. The Crown itself claimed an inherent right to any valuable metals found on land in 1568, and people who had less than four acres of land were prohibited from building homes by the Erection of Cottages Act 1588. The final, formal end of feudal land tenure in England came only after the English Civil War. When the monarchy was restored Parliament ensured with the Tenures Abolition Act 1660 that landlords' obligations of service and military provision were replaced by monetary payments and an annual payment financed by taxation.

=== Changes in equity ===
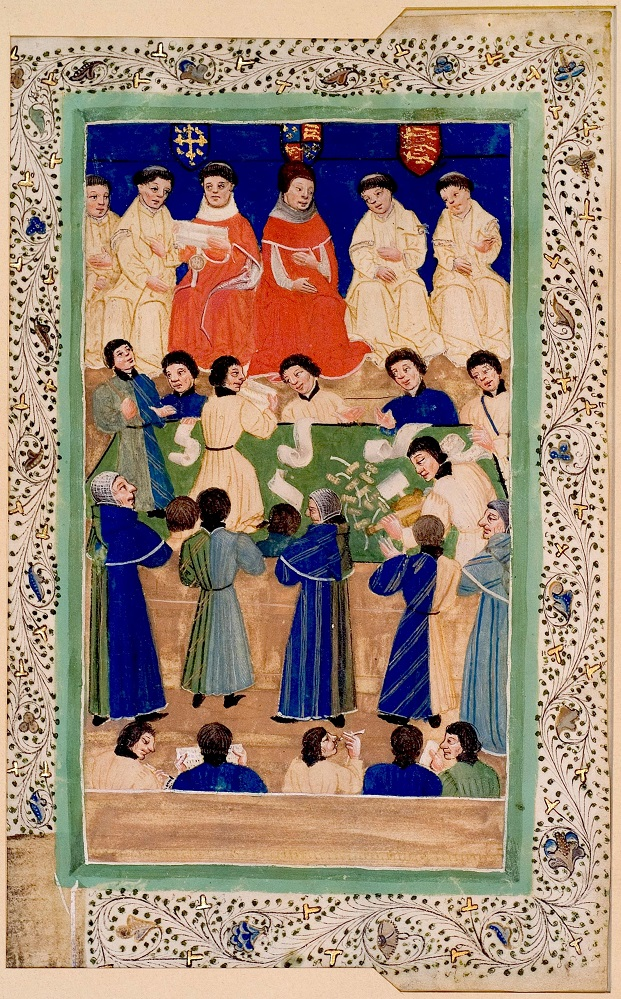
The Court of Chancery could mitigate the injustice of strict common law rules of property, if the Lord Chancellor deemed it equitable. The court systems were merged by the Judicature Acts of 1873–1875.

Over the same period, behind the momentous shifts in land's social significance, legal developments in the law of property revolved around the split between the courts of common law and equity. The courts of common law (the Court of Common Pleas and the Court of the King's Bench) took a strict approach to the rules of title to land, and how many people could have legal interests in land. However, the King had the power to hear petitions and overturn cases of common law. He delegated the hearing of petitions to his Lord Chancellor, whose office grew into a court. During the crusades, landowners who went to fight would transfer title to a person they trusted so that feudal services could be performed and received. But some who survived had returned only to find that the people they entrusted were refusing to transfer title back. They sought justice with the Lord Chancellor, and his Court of Chancery determined that the true "use" or "benefit" of the land did not belong to the person on the title (or the feoffee who held seisin). Unlike the common law judges, the Chancellor held the cestui que use, the owner in equity, could be a different person, if this is what good conscience dictated. This recognition of a split in English law, between legal and equitable owner, between someone who controlled title and another for whose benefit the land would be used, was the beginning of trust law. It was similarly useful among Franciscan friars, who would transfer title of land to others as they were precluded from holding property by their vows of poverty. Uses or trusts were also employed to avoid the payment of feudal dues. If a person died, the law stated a landlord was entitled to money before the land passed to heir, and the whole property under the doctrine of escheat if there were no heirs. Transferring title to a group of people for common use could ensure this never happened, because if one person died he could be replaced, and it was unlikely for all to die at the same time. King Henry VIII saw that this deprived the Crown of revenue, and so in the Statute of Uses 1535 he attempted to prohibit them, stipulating all land belonged in fact to the cestui que use. However, when Henry VIII was gone, the Court of Chancery held that it had no application where land was leased. Moreover, the primacy of equity over the common law was reasserted, supported by King James I in 1615, in the Earl of Oxford’s case. The institution of the use continued, as new sources of revenue from the mercantile exploits in the New World decreased the Crown's reliance on feudal dues. By the early 1700s, the use had formalised into a trust: where land was settled to be held by a trustee, for the benefit of another, the Courts of Chancery recognised the beneficiary as the true owner in equity.

In the reign of Elizabeth the Fraudulent Conveyances Act 1571 (13 Eliz. 1. c. 5) and the Fraudulent Conveyances Act 1584 (27 Eliz. 1. c. 4) avoided fraudulent conveyances as against all parties and voluntary conveyances as against subsequent purchasers for valuable consideration. Early in the reign of Charles II the Tenures Abolition Act 1660 turned most feudal tenures into tenure by free and common socage and abolished the feudal incidents. The Statute of Frauds contained provisions that certain leases and assignments, and that all agreements and trusts relating to land, should be in writing. The land registries of Middlesex and Yorkshire date from the reign of Anne. Devises (gifts by will) of land for charitable purposes were forbidden by the Charitable Uses Act 1735 (9 Geo. 2. c. 36). In the next reign the first general inclosure act, the Inclosure (Consolidation) Act 1801 (41 Geo. 3. (U.K.) c. 109), was passed. In the reign of William IV fines and recoveries were abolished and simpler modes of conveyance substituted, and the laws of inheritance and dower were amended.

=== Industrial revolution ===
"As soon as the land of any country has all become private property, the landlords, like all other men, love to reap where they never sowed, and demand a rent even for its natural produce. The wood of the forest, the grass of the field, and all the natural fruits of the earth, which, when land was in common, cost the labourer only the trouble of gathering them, come, even to him, to have an additional price fixed upon them. He must then pay for the licence to gather them; and must give up to the landlord a portion of what his labour either collects or produces. This portion, or, what comes to the same thing, the price of this portion, constitutes the rent of land ...."

— Adam Smith, The Wealth of Nations (1776) Book I, ch 6

Over the 18th century, the law of real property mostly came to a standstill in legislation, but principles continued to develop in the courts of equity, notably under Lord Nottingham (from 1673 to 1682), Lord King (1725–1733), Lord Hardwicke (1737–1756), Lord Henley (1757–1766), and Lord Eldon (1801–1827). As national and global trade expanded, the power of a new monied class of business men was growing, and the economic and political importance of land was diminishing with it. The moral philosopher and father of economics, Adam Smith, reflected these changes as he argued in The Wealth of Nations that landowners' position allowed them to extract rents from others in return for very little.

== Liberal reforms ==
In the 19th century, a growing liberal movement for reform produced three major results.

=== Conveyancing and registration ===
First, there was increasing pressure to dismantle the privileges of the landed aristocracy. This included the view that all land should be put on a register, so as to ease its ability to be marketed. The Land Transfer Act 1875 (38 & 39 Vict. c. 87) introduced a voluntary system, but it was not taken up. After the 1906 general election the new Chancellor of the Exchequer, David Lloyd George, in his People's Budget of 1909 introduced a tax on land to force it onto the market. This provoked a constitutional crisis, as the hereditary House of Lords vetoed it, forcing fresh elections. But the Liberal government was returned and it abolished the Lords right of veto in the Parliament Act 1911 (1 & 2 Geo. 5. c. 13). By then, land registration reforms were a minor political issue and only really opposed by solicitors who earned sizeable conveyancing fees. Eventually, the Land Registration Act 1925 (15 & 16 Geo. 5. c. 21) required any dealing with property triggered compulsory registration.

In the reign of Victoria there was a vast mass of legislation dealing with real estate in almost every conceivable aspect. At the immediate beginning of the reign stands the Wills Act 1837 (7 Will. 4 & 1 Vict. c. 26). The transfer of real estate was simplified by the Real Property Act 1845 (8 & 9 Vict. c. 106) and by the Conveyancing Act 1881 (44 & 45 Vict. c. 41) and Conveyancing Act 1882 (45 & 46 Vict. c. 39) Additional powers of dealing with settled estates were given by the Settled Estates Act 1856 (19 & 20 Vict. c. 120), later by the Settled Estates Act 1877 (40 & 41 Vict. c. 18), and the Settled Land Act 1882 (45 & 46 Vict. c. 38). Succession duty was levied for the first time on freeholds in 1853. The strictness of the Mortmain Act 1735 (9 Geo. 2. c. 36) was relaxed in favour of gifts and sales to public institutions of various kinds, such as schools, parks and museums by the Mortmain and Charitable Uses Act 1888 (51 & 52 Vict. c. 42). The period of limitation was shortened for most purposes from twenty to twelve years by the Real Property Limitation Act 1874 (37 & 38 Vict. c. 57). Several acts were passed dealing with the enfranchisement and commutation of copyholds and the preservation of commons and open spaces. The Naturalization Act 1870 (33 & 34 Vict. c. 14) enabled aliens to hold and transfer land in England. The Forfeiture Act 1870 (33 & 34 Vict. c. 23) abolished forfeiture of real estate on conviction for felony. The Agricultural Holdings Act 1883 (46 & 47 Vict. c. 61) and the Agricultural Holdings Act 1900 (63 & 64 Vict. c. 50), and other acts, gave the tenant of a tenancy within the acts a general right to compensation for improvements, substituted a year's notice to quit for the six months' notice previously necessary, enlarged the tenant's right to fixtures, and limited the amount of distress. By the Intestates Estates Act 1884 (47 & 48 Vict. c. 71) the law of escheat was extended to incorporeal hereditaments and equitable estates. Other subjects dealt with by legislation in the 19th century land transfer, registration, mortgage, partition, excambion, fixtures, taking of land in execution, declaration of title and apportionment.

The Law of Property Act 1925 (15 & 16 Geo. 5. c. 20) provides the core of modern English land law. It reduced the number of estates recognised at common law to two (freehold and leashold). It also made it easier to transfer interests in land.

=== Court reform ===
Second, the Court of Chancery, though it may have mitigated the petty strictnesses of the common law of property, was seen as cumbersome and arcane. It was subjected to ridicule in books like Charles Dickens' Bleak House and his fictional case of Jarndyce and Jarndyce, an inheritance question or dispute that nobody understood, dragged on for generations and ended in costs having devoured the property held in chancery (chiefly for safekeeping). Largely this was because there were only two judges administering equitable principles, so from 1873 to 1875, the common law and equity courts were merged into one hierarchy. Under the Supreme Court of Judicature Act 1875 (38 & 39 Vict. c. 77), equitable principles would prevail in case of conflict.

=== Political reform ===
Third, in most counties and boroughs, the ability to vote for Members of Parliament had been tied to possession of property in land. From the Great Reform Act 1832, to the Reform Act 1867, and the Representation of the People Act 1918, the connection between property and the vote was gradually reduced and then abolished. Together with the Parliament Act 1911, a more democratic constitution had emerged, though it was only in 1928 that the voting age for men and women became equal and only in 1948 that the double votes and extra constituencies for students of the Universities of Oxford, Cambridge and London were removed. By the end of the First World War, the power of the old landed aristocracy had largely been broken.

== Modern land law ==
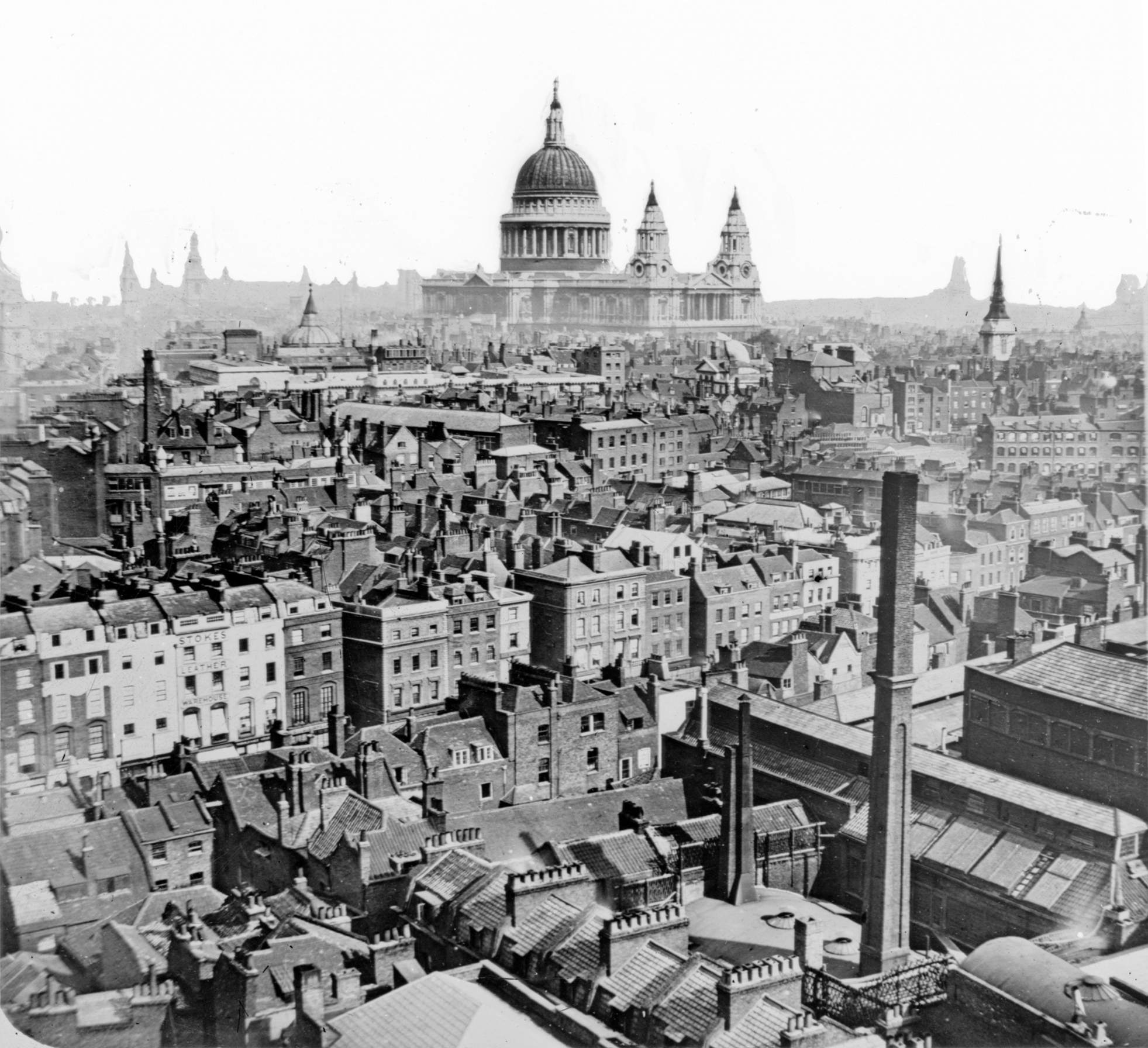
After both World Wars, land management and housing increasingly came under social ownership and regulation, with new council homes, rights for tenants, and ownership interests in land recognised through contributions to family life.

Over the twentieth century, and following on from the 1925 reforms, land law became increasingly social in character. First, from the Housing, Town Planning, &c. Act 1919 and the post war government's policy of building "homes fit for heroes" more and more houses were built, and maintained, by local governments. In private accommodation, new rights were enacted for tenants against their landlords, with some security of tenure and rent regulation, a break on unfettered "freedom of contract". The Housing Act 1980 enabled enfranchisement by introducing a "right to buy" one's council home accompanied by a settled policy of cutting government funding of social housing which was growing as concrete tower blocks and other forms of cheap construction became heavily criticised by socialists and capitalists alike. Rights for short term lessees (tenants) and constraints on rent were reduced accompanied by putting tenancies in a standard six-month authorised form of tenancy, procedure for eviction, and providing a settled definition of "fit for habitation" under the Landlord and Tenant Act 1985 and the Protection from Eviction Act 1977.

Second, property was increasingly used as a source of finance for business, and similarly became source of profit for banks, mortgage lenders and real estate investment trusts. This fact drove changes in the market for mortgage regulation, while the growing financial interest in land tended to conflict with family life. As the UK came closer to gender equality, women as much as men contributed to the purchase of homes, as well as contributing to raising families and children. In 1970, in Pettitt v Pettitt, Lord Diplock remarked that "the wider employment of married women in industry, commerce and the professions and the emergence of a property-owning, particularly a real-property-mortgaged-to-a-building-society-owning, democracy" had compelled courts to acknowledge contributions to the home and family life as potentially generating proprietary interests. However, if banks sought to repossess homes from people who had defaulted on mortgage repayments, the courts were faced with a choice of whether to prefer those economic interests over social values. The membership of the United Kingdom in the European Convention on Human Rights meant that article 8, on the right to a private and family life, could change the freedom of banks or landlords to evict people, particularly where children's stability and upbringing were at stake, though by the early twenty-first century the case law had remained cautious.

Third, land use in general was subject to a comprehensive regulatory framework. The old common laws between neighbours, of easements, covenants, nuisance, and trespass were largely eclipsed by locally and democratically determined planning laws, environmental regulation, and a framework for use of agricultural resources.

The Land Registration Act 2002 replaced previous legislation governing land registration. As of 2008, the Act, together with the Land Registration Rules, regulates the role and practice of HM Land Registry.

== See also ==
- English land law
- English property law
- Legal history of wills
- Law of Property Act 1925

== Sources ==
Articles

- EP Cheyney, 'The Disappearance of English Serfdom' (1900) 15(57) English Historical Review 20
- HM Cassidy, ‘The Emergence of the Free Labor Contract in England’ (1928) 18(2) American Economic Review 201
- MR Cohen, ‘Property and Sovereignty’ (1927) 13 Cornell LQ 8
- A Offer, ‘The Origins of the Law of Property Acts 1910-25’ (1977) 40(5) Modern Law Review 505

Books

- A Abram, Social England in the Fifteenth Century (1909)
- N Denholm-Young, Seignorial Administration in England (Routledge 1963)
- A Fitzherbert, Surueyenge (1546)
- J Froissart, The Chronicles of Froissart (1385) translated by GC Macaulay (1895)
- WS Holdsworth, A History of English Law (1923) vol 4
- John Hudson, Land, Law, and Lordship in Anglo-Norman England (Paperback edn OUP 1997) ISBN 0-19-820688-7
- DD McGarry, Medieval History and Civilization (1976)
- FW Maitland, Equity (1936)
- J Martin, Modern Equity (17th edn 2005)
- T More, Utopia (1516)
- P Vinogradoff, Villainage in England (Clarendon 1892)
- F Pollock, The Land Laws (Freeman Press) ISBN 1-4067-2805-5
- A Simpson, A History of the Land Law (2nd edn OUP 1986)
