= Knight's fee =

Feudal unit measure of land

In feudal Anglo-Norman England and Ireland, a knight's fee was a unit measure of land deemed sufficient to support a knight. It would not only provide sustenance for himself, his family, and servants, but also the means to furnish himself and his retinue with horses and armour to fight for his overlord in battle. It was effectively the size of a fief (or "fee" which is synonymous with "fief") sufficient to support one knight in the ongoing performance of his feudal duties (knight-service).

A knight's fee cannot be stated as a standard number of acres, as the required acreage to produce a given crop or revenue would vary depending on many factors, including its location, the richness of its soil and the local climate, as well as the presence of other exploitable resources such as a fishing weir, quarries of rock, or mines of minerals. If a knight's fee is deemed coterminous with a manor, an average size would be between 1,000 and 5,000 acres, of which much in early times was still "waste", forest and uncultivated moorland.

== Creation ==
A knight's fee could be created by the king himself or by one of his tenants-in-chief by separating off an area of land from his own demesne (land held in-hand), which process when performed by the latter was known as subinfeudation, and establishing therein a new manor for the use of a knight who would by the process of enfeoffment become his tenant by paying homage and fealty to his new overlord. This homage and fealty was a vow of loyalty to his overlord, with corresponding vow of protection received, and an undertaking to provide a specified form of service commonly due under feudal land tenure in England. Broadly speaking such service was either military (knight-service) or non-military (serjeanty, etc.). Military service was generally to a maximum of 40 days per annum, signifying that he would have to fight for his overlord in battle. No cash rent was payable, although military service was later transformable into scutage. A knight was required to maintain the dignity of knighthood, which meant that he should live in suitable style and be well-turned out in battle, with the required number of esquires to serve him and with horses, arms and armour for all.

== Used as a unit for tax assessment ==
A feudal tenant-in-chief of the king was assessed for certain feudal aids according as to how many knight's fees he held, whether tenanted or held in demesne. Where a knight's fee was inherited by joint heiresses, the fee would be split into two or more moieties, that is two separate parts, each a manor of itself with its own manorial court, each deemed half a knight's fee, and so-on down to smaller fractions. Thus a magnate could be overlord to, say, 12 1/2 knight's fees.

== Subinfeudation ==
A knight's fee was not only originally created by the process of subinfeudation, but could itself be split into smaller units by the same process, otherwise than through inheritance. By this means, until the practice was outlawed in 1290 by the statute of Quia Emptores, a knight could create his own feudal retainer who would pledge fealty to him rather than to the overlord. Such a holding was termed a sub-fee.

It can thus be seen that the knight's fee was the base unit of land valuation for use in the feudal system.

== See also ==
- Examples of feudalism for historic examples of knight's fees
- Seigneurialism
