= Castle-guard =

Arrangement under the feudal system

Castle-guard was an arrangement under the feudal system, by which the duty of finding knights to guard royal castles was imposed on certain manors, knight's fees or baronies. The greater barons provided for the guard of their castles by exacting a similar duty from their sub-enfeoffed knights. The obligation was commuted very early for a fixed money payment, a form of scutage known as "castle-guard rent", which lasted into modern times. For a very detailed study of castle-guard see : 'Castleguard arrangements for the Border Castles of Montgomery, Clun, Bishop's Castle, Caus, and Oswestry in the Thirteenth Century'; Transactions of the Shropshire Archaeological and Historical Society'; Volume 100 (2025); pp 45-62.

Castle-guard was a common form of feudal tenure, almost ubiquitous, on the Isle of Wight where all manors were held from the Lord of the Isle of Wight, seated at Carisbrook Castle.
