= Thomas Hache II =

Sir Thomas Hache II (c. 1380 - 28 April 1436) was a prominent landowning knight from Pembrokeshire, Wales during the feudal period of what is now The United Kingdom.

== Life ==
Hache was the first of three siblings, and the only son born of Thomas Hache I, a wealthy landowner of Wales. Hache was reportedly a natural at swordplay, with his skills praised by many of his instructors. In about 1400, Hache joined the Welsh Military, though his service was mostly limited to small naval expeditions.
