= Frank almoin =

Obsolete feudal land tenure in England

Frank almoin, frankalmoign or frankalmoigne (/ˈfræŋkælmɔɪn, fræŋˈkælmɔɪn, ˌfræŋkælˈmɔɪn/) was one of the feudal land tenures in feudal England whereby an ecclesiastical body held land free of military service such as knight service or other secular or religious service (but sometimes in return for the religious service of saying prayers and masses for the soul of the grantor). Secular service not due, and in the 12th and 13th centuries, jurisdiction over land so held belonged to the ecclesiastical courts and was thus immune from royal jurisdiction.

In English law, frankalmoign(e) was also known as "tenure in free alms". Gifts to religious institutions in free alms were defined first as gifts to God, then to the patron saint of the religious house and finally to those religious serving God in the specific house.

The following example is from a charter of William de Vernon, 5th Earl of Devon (d.1217), to Quarr Abbey:

Hanc donationem praedictis monachis in puram et perpetuam eleemosinam liberam ab omni servitio in perpetuum possidendam confirmavi.

I have confirmed this donation to the foresaid monks in pure and perpetual mercy [alms] free from all service in perpetual possession.

As the above example makes clear it was a freehold tenure as it was held in perpetual possession, which is equivalent to "hereditable" in secular terms. Religious houses in receipt of free alms could not recognise a secular lord. The gift of land or other property made over to God and to a patron Saint was inalienable, and the relationship between the grantor and the religious house was subsidiary.

In the 12th century the institution came to be misused. Land could be donated to a church organization and then leased back to the donor, allowing the donor to avoid the feudal services due to his lord. Legal cases became so complicated that the Assize of Utrum was established in the middle of the 12th century to adjudicate claims.

Thomas de Littleton's Tenures, which perhaps appeared about 1470 as an update of a then century-old predecessor tract (the Old Tenures), said to have been written under Edward III, contains a section on Frankalmoin.

And they which hold in frank-almoign are bound of right before God to make orisons, prayers, masses, and other divine services, for the souls of their grantor or feoffor, and for the souls of their ancestors which are dead, and for the prosperity and good life and good health of their heirs, which are alive. And therefore they shall do no fealty to their lord … because, that this divine service is better for them before God, than any doing of fealty; and also because that these words (frank-almoign) exclude the lord to have any earthly or temporal service, but to have only divine and spiritual service to be done for him, &c.

Edward Coke commented on this in the first part of his Institutes of the Lawes of England, published within his Commentary upon Littleton, which he completed about a century and a half after its subject's first appearance. Coke provided cases and noted how practice related to Littleton's work had changed during that time.

Frankalmoin was the tenure by which the greater number of the monasteries and religious houses held their lands; it was expressly exempted from the Tenures Abolition Act 1660, by which the other ancient tenures were abolished, and it was the tenure by which the parochial clergy and many ecclesiastical and eleemosynary foundations held their lands through the 19th century.

As a form of donation, frankalmoin fell into disuse because on any alienation of the land the tenure was converted into socage. An apparent attempt was made to abolish frankalmoin in the Administration of Estates Act 1925; but in any case no fresh grants in frankalmoin, save by the Crown, were possible after Quia Emptores in 1290.

== See also ==
- History of English land law
- Frank-marriage
- Quia Emptores
- Henry de Bracton
