= Serjeanty =

Land tenure under the feudal system

Under feudalism in France and England during the Middle Ages, tenure by serjeanty (/ˈsɑːrdʒənti/) was a form of tenure in return for a specified duty other than standard knight-service.

== Etymology ==
The word comes from the French noun sergent, itself from the Latin serviens, servientis, "serving", the present participle of the verb servo, "to keep, preserve, save, rescue, deliver". "Sergeant" is derived from the same source, though developing an entirely different meaning.

== Origins and development ==
Serjeanty originated in the assignation of an estate in land on condition of the performance of a certain duty other than knight-service, usually the discharge of duties in the household of the king or a noble. It ranged from non-standard service in the king's army (distinguished only by equipment from that of the knight), to petty renders (for example the rendering of a quantity of basic food such as a goose) scarcely distinguishable from those of the rent-paying tenant or socager.

The legal historians Frederick Pollock and Frederic William Maitland (1895) described it as being a free "servantship" in the sense that the serjeant, whatever his task, was essentially a menial servant. However the feudal historian John Horace Round objected that their definition does not cover military serjeanties and glosses over the honorific value of at least some of the services.

The historian Mary Bateson stated as follows concerning serjeanties:

(They) were neither always military nor always agricultural, but might approach very closely the service of knights or the service of farmers ... The serjeanty of holding the king's head when he made a rough passage across the Channel, of pulling a rope when his vessel landed, of counting his chessmen on Christmas Day, of bringing fuel to his castle, of doing his carpentry, of finding his pot-herbs, of forging his irons for his ploughs, of tending his garden, of nursing the hounds gored and injured in the hunt, of serving as veterinary to his sick falcons, such and many others might be the ceremonial or menial services due from a given serjeanty.

The varieties of serjeanty were later increased by lawyers, who for the sake of convenience categorised under this head such duties as escort service to the Abbess of Barking, or of military service on the Welsh border by the men of Archenfield.

=== Domesday Book ===
Serjeants (servientes) already appear as a distinct class in the Domesday Book of 1086, though not in all cases differentiated from the barons, who held by knight-service. A few mediaeval tenures by serjeanty can be definitely traced as far back as Domesday in the case of three Hampshire serjeanties: those of acting as king's marshal, of finding an archer for his service, and of keeping the gaol in Winchester Castle. It is probable, however, that many supposed tenures by serjeanty were not really such, although so described in returns, in inquisitions post mortem, and other records. The simplest legal test of the tenure was that serjeants, though liable to the feudal exactions of wardship, etc., were not liable to scutage; they made in place of this exaction special composition with the Crown.

Some of the Domesday Book tenants may have been serjeants before the Norman Conquest, in the time of King Edward the Confessor. For instance, a certain Siward Accipitrarius (from Latin accipiter, "hawk"), presumably hawker to Edward the Confessor, held from the king an estate worth £7 in Somerset and did so in an area appropriate to his occupation, close to a water habitat. J. H. Round ascribed the development of serjeanties in England to Norman influence, though he did not dismiss earlier roots. The Anglo-Saxon historian James Campbell has suggested that serjeanties such as the messenger services recorded in the 13th century may represent "semi-fossilised remnants of important parts of the Anglo-Saxon governmental system".

== Grand serjeanty versus petty serjeanty ==
The germ of the later distinction between "grand" (French: grand, "large") and "petty" (French petit, "small") serjeanty is found in Magna Carta of 1215, the king there renouncing the right of prerogative wardship in the case of those who held of him by the render of small articles. The legal doctrine which developed that serjeanties were inalienable (i.e. non-transferable) and impartible led during the reign of King Henry III (1216–1272) to the arrentation (permission to enclose in exchange for rent) of those serjeanties the lands of which had been partly alienated, which were thereby converted into socage tenures (i.e. paying money rents), or in some cases, tenures by knight-service. Gradually the gulf widened, and "petty" serjeanties, consisting of renders, together with serjeanties held of mesne lords, sank into socage, while "grand" serjeanties, the holders of which performed their service in person, became alone liable to the burden of wardship and marriage. In Littleton's Tenures (15th century), this distinction appears as well defined, but the development was one of legal theory.

== Disintegration ==
By the reign of King Edward I (1272–1307), tenure by serjeanty was well on the retreat, as Kimball (1936) observes:

Once it began to give way, serjeanty disintegrated more quickly and easily than the other tenures as the feudal conception of society lost its hold ... Its miscellaneous services had ... many fates. A large number soon became obsolete; others were commuted to money payments or changed to knight's service; a few that were honourable or ornamental were retained in their original form as part of the coronation ceremony. Some being still useful were performed by deputy, or absorbed into the regular administrative system.

When the military tenure of knight-service was abolished at the Restoration of the Monarchy by King Charles II (1660–1685), that of grand serjeanty was retained, doubtless on account of its honorary character, it being then limited in practice to the performance of certain duties at coronations, the discharge of which as a right has always been coveted, and the earliest record of which is that of the coronation of Queen Eleanor of Provence in 1236. The most conspicuous are those of King's Champion, appurtenant to the manor of Scrivelsby, long held by the Dymoke family, and of supporting the king's right arm, appurtenant to the manor of Worksop.

== Modern remnants ==
Although today any surviving remnants of grand sergeanty are regarded as roles of high honour, it should be remembered that originally grand sergeanty was a duty, not a right. Clearly even by the medieval era much grand sergeanty had become in practice merely a token of high honour given by a monarch, where the duty was patently absurd and entirely non-onerous, except for the requirement of the physical presence of the tenant concerned. The duty of supporting the king's right arm was still performed at the coronation of King Edward VII in 1902. Although the first holder of such heritable grand sergeanties was clearly a man well liked and respected by the appointing monarch, and suitable to the role, the character of the tenant's heir in the duty, often involving close personal proximity, might be less pleasing to future monarchs. Today, those with duties pertaining to the coronation are required to make their case to perform them at the Court of Claims.

The meaning of serjeant as a household officer is still preserved in the monarch's serjeants-at-arms, serjeant-surgeons and serjeant-trumpeter. The horse and foot serjeants (servientes) of the king's army in the 12th century, who ranked after the knights and were more lightly armed, were unconnected with land tenure.

== Examples of grand serjeanty ==
- Manor of Farnham, duty to provide white kid gloves and support king's right arm, while the Royal Sceptre was in his hand during Coronation, from the late 11th century until 1327.
- Manor of Worksop, similarly, from 1327.
- Manor of Scrivelsby, The King's Champion
- Manor of Kingston Russell, duty to count the King's chessmen and store them away after a game
- Manor of Kenninghall, the Chief Butler of England
- Manor of Bardolf-in-Addington, duty to serve a mess of dillegrout at coronations, 1066 until 1821
- Manor of Nether Bilsington, duty to present three maple cups
- Manor of Eston-le-Mount, chief larderer and caterer
- Manor of Wymondley, duty to bear a silver-gilt cup
- Manor of Lyston, duty to bear a charger of wafers
- Manor of Pelham, chief sewer (server)
- Manor of Heydon, duty to bear a towel for washing the monarch's hands
- Manor of Bedford, almoner
- Manor of Ashele, naperer
- Manor of Sculton, larderer
- The manor of Kinver and Stourton, keeping the royal forest of Kinver

== Hereditary offices in gross ==
Serjeanty is to be distinguished from offices held hereditarily "in gross". These are not serjeanties, as they were not incidents of the tenure of a manor or other land. They are heritable in the same way as baronies by writ, so that they can pass to a daughter where there is no male heir, and be split between daughters as co-heiresses if there are several.

These include:

- the Lord Great Chamberlain;
- the duty to carry the spurs at a coronation, vested in descendants of the Earl of Pembroke. In 2023, the spurs were carried by Delaval Astley, 23rd Baron Hastings, and Simon Abney-Hastings, 15th Earl of Loudoun, who shares with other descendants of 20th Baroness Grey de Ruthyn including the Earl of Romney, the Viscount St Davids and the Baron Churston.
- the Grand Carver of England.

== See also ==
- Quia Emptores
- History of English land law
- Feudal land tenure
