= Statutes of Mortmain =

1279 and 1290 English statutes

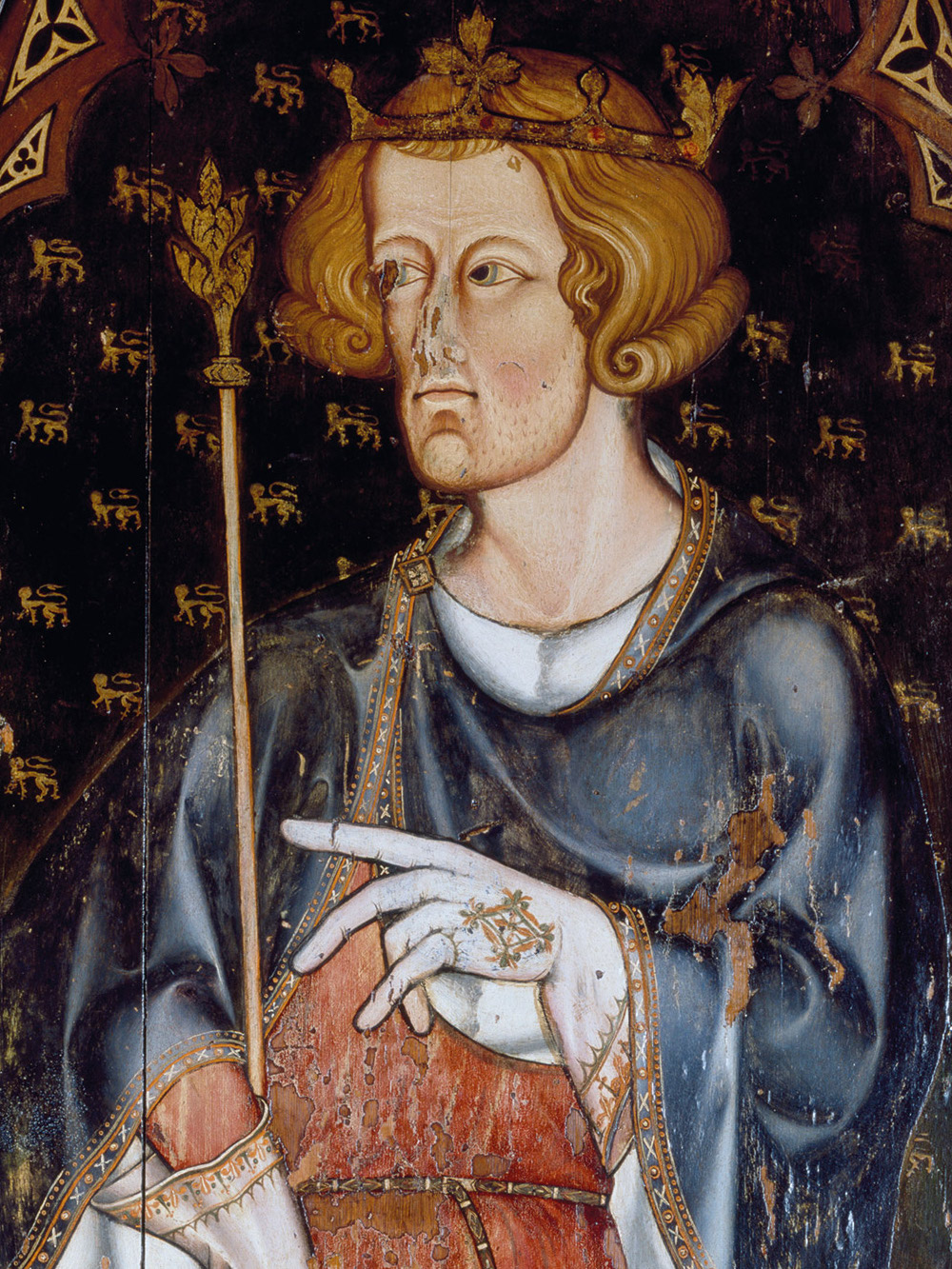
The Statutes of Mortmain, 1279 and 1290, were initiated by Edward I of England to re-establish the prohibition of donation of land to the Roman Catholic Church, originally proscribed by Magna Carta in 1215.

The Statutes of Mortmain were two enactments, in 1279 (Statutum de Viris Religiosis, 7 Edw. 1) and 1290 (Quia Emptores, 18 Edw. 1), passed in the reign of Edward I of England, aimed at preserving the kingdom's revenues by preventing land from passing into the possession of the Church. Possession of property by a corporation such as the Church was known as mortmain, literally "dead hand". In medieval England, feudal estates generated taxes for the King (known as feudal incidents), principally on the grant or inheritance of the estate. If an estate became owned by a religious corporation — which could never die, could never attain majority, and could never be attainted for treason — these taxes never became payable. It was akin to the estates being owned by the dead, hence the term.

The Statutes of Mortmain were meant to re-establish the prohibition against donating land to the Church for the purpose of avoiding feudal services, a prohibition which had originated in Magna Carta in 1215 and was specifically defined in its 1217 issue. But King John, the original signatory of Magna Carta, died the following year, and his son, Henry III, did not enforce the proscriptions and, to the contrary, showed great deference to the Church.

Henry's son, Edward I, desired to re-establish the precedent set by the 1215 and 1217 issues of Magna Carta. The Statutes of Mortmain thus provided that no estate could be granted to a corporation without royal consent. However, these statutes proved ineffective in practice, and the problem of Church lands persisted, due to the development of the device of the cestui que use, which side-stepped the royal courts and began–in the ecclesiastical courts–the development of the law of trusts, which separated the legal ownership from the right of occupation or use of land. The issue was only resolved in 1535, when Henry VIII dissolved the monasteries, confiscating all monastic lands for the Crown, though the bishops remained endowed with much land.

== Alienation and the statute of Quia Emptores ==
In England in the 12th and 13th centuries, the legal ownership of land was defined through a hierarchical system of estates. The monarch was the ultimate owner of all land in the realm, and out of his estate lesser estates existed, held by individuals known as tenants in chief. Further estates could be created out of these estates in a process called subinfeudation.

Estates in land could be alienated (that is, their legal title – i.e. ownership – could be transferred to others), in two ways. Substitution meant that the transferee would take the estate with the same tenure, and hold from the same lord, as the original tenant. Subinfeudation meant that the original tenant continued to hold his estate, but there was created a new estate which was held from and through the original tenant, and which was subsidiary to the original estate.

Alienation was not always possible, and sometimes the permission of the immediate overlord was required. In the opinion of Pollock and Maitland, in the middle of the 13th century the tenant enjoyed a largely unfettered power of disposing of his tenement inter vivos, though this was subject to some restraints in favour of the overlord.

Other opinions have been expressed. Coke regarded the English tradition as one of ancient liberty dictated by custom, in which the tenant had relative freedom to alienate all or part of his estate. Blackstone was of a differing conclusion, namely that the law supported the inalienability of the fief as its starting point. Pollock and Maitland believed Coke's opinion to be the more valid one. Both views may have been true: modern scholars may have given more weight to the written law of the Normans than existed in reality after the Black Death had altered the economic conditions of the age.

A significant consequence of the ability of owners to alienate their estates was a growth in gifts of land to the Church. Estates so given were said to be held in frankalmoin tenure. The King made various attempts to prevent this practice, including in Magna Carta in 1215 and in the Statutes of Mortmain in 1279 and 1290, but these measures were largely ineffective.

Where estates were subinfeudated, the practice of mortmain was detrimental to the overlord's rights. It was difficult or impossible for an overlord to extract any services (such as knight service, rent, or homage) from the new tenant, who had no bond to the overlord. Pollock and Maitland give the following example: in a case of subinfeudation, the old tenant was liable for services to the lord. If A enfeoffed to B, to hold on a knight's service (a form of military service), and then B enfeoffed C to hold at a rent of a pound of pepper per year, if B then dies leaving an under-age heir, A is entitled to a wardship, but it will be worth very little: instead of being entitled to enjoy the land itself until the heir is of full age, the overlord will get only a few annual pounds of pepper, because C is in possession, not B. Instead of enjoying the land itself, by wardship or by escheat, he will only receive a trifling peppercorn rent.

Bracton gives the example of a tenant making a gift of frankalmoin: gifting land to the Church. A right of wardship would have no value at all, as ownership cannot henceforth pass to a minor. An escheat of the land (reclaiming the land by the overlord, for want of an heir to inherit it) would allow the overlord to re-take control of the land. But by placing the land in frankalmoin it was left in the hands of a group of lawyers or others, who allowed the use of the land by a religious organisation. The overlord would have only nominal control of this corporation, as it had never entered into a feudal homage arrangement, hence the corporation owed nothing to the overlord. Bracton was sympathetic to this arrangement. According to him, the lord was not really injured, as his rights to the land remained unscathed. It is true they had been significantly diminished, as he had suffered damnum; but there had been no injuria. Bracton was of the opinion that a gift of land to the Church could be voided only by the heirs of the donor, not by the feudal overlord.

The statute of Quia Emptores, enacted in 1290, confirmed the ability of tenants freely to alienate their estates by substitution, but ended the possibility of alienation by subinfeudation. It also ended the possibility for further estates in frankalmoin to be created by anyone other than the king, as any gift of land to the Church now required royal consent; but the lawyers who had created frankalmoin now nimbly side-stepped the Statutes of Mortmain, and the cumbersome and useless common law courts, with the development of a replacement device in the ecclesiastical courts, the cestui que use.

== Frankalmoin and the Assize of Utrum ==
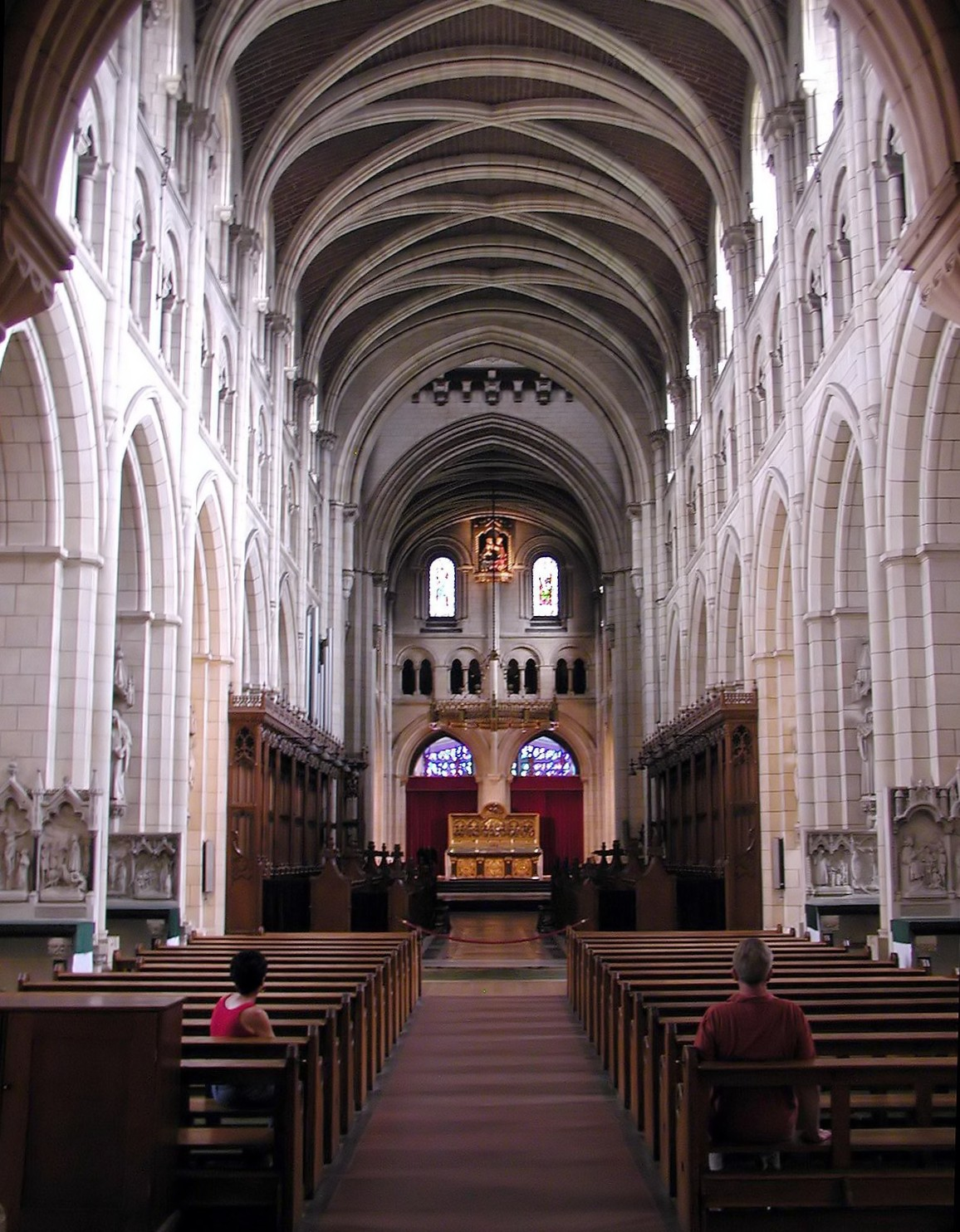
Buckfast Abbey in Devon as rebuilt. It originated on land donated in by King Cnut in 1018, and became a Cistercian abbey in 1147.

Gifts of land in frankalmoin were intended to be made to God. Bracton describes these as "primo et principaliter" (first and principally) to God, and only "secundario" (secondarily) to the canons or monks or parsons. A gift, for example, to Ramsey Abbey would take the form of a gift "to God and St. Benet of Ramsey and the Abbot Walter and the monks of St. Benet"; or in shorthand, "to God and the church of St. Benet of Ramsey" or briefly "to God and St. Benet".

Often the donor laid the charter of feoffment or some other symbol, such as a knife or other symbol of possession, upon the altar of the church. God was considered the primary landowner. Bracton founds several arguments upon this assertion. It suggested land given in frankalmoin was outside the sphere of mere human justice.

In later years, the feature of the tenure of frankalmoin which attracted the notice of lawyers was the absence of any service that could be enforced by the secular courts. Grants from the Crown "in free, pure and perpetual alms" would be free from all secular services. However, if a mesne (i.e. intermediate) lord was involved, then services such as socage, fee and other services might be extracted from the land, either in part or in total.

Cases became so complicated that a special assize, the Assize of Utrum, was established in the middle of the 12th century. Jurisdiction would normally lie with the ecclesiastical courts; but the Assize of Utrum, especially as defined in the Constitutions of Clarendon in 1164, gave the Crown a chance to clarify difficult questions of ownership and duty in a non-religious, secular court. Often, ownership was of less importance than in determining who had rights to grain, to knight service, to marriage penalties, and the like feudal rights. These duties were defined by the manner in which the land had been granted, and by who in the feudal chain had made the grant. Frequently, land would be donated to a religious body, which would simultaneously re-let it to the donor, in order to evade those feudal services which otherwise would be due to the immediate overlord.

== Problems with mortmain in Bracton's time ==
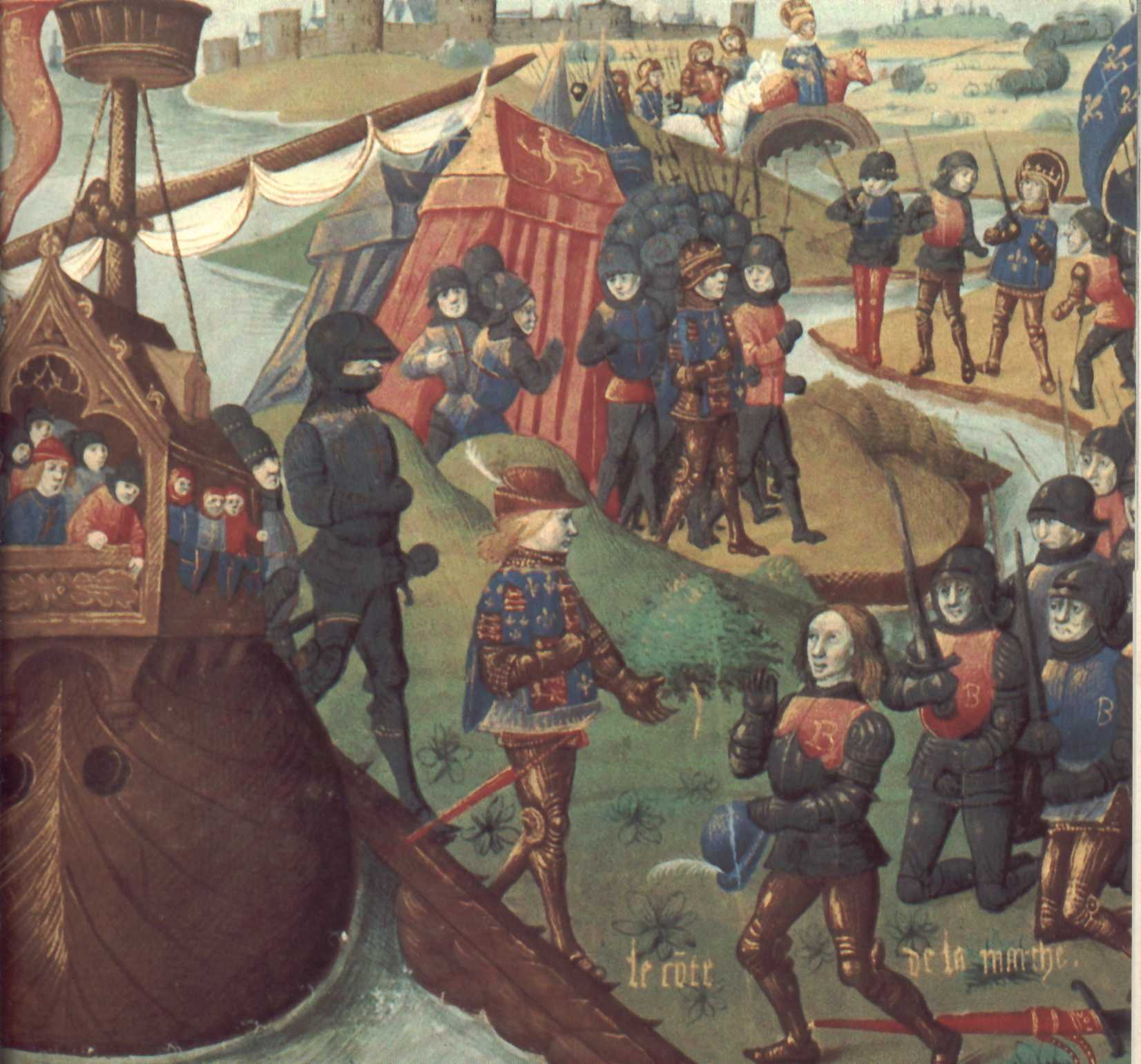
Henry III of England afforded great deference to the Church, and did not enforce the proscriptions against mortmain in the Great Charters of 1215 and 1217.

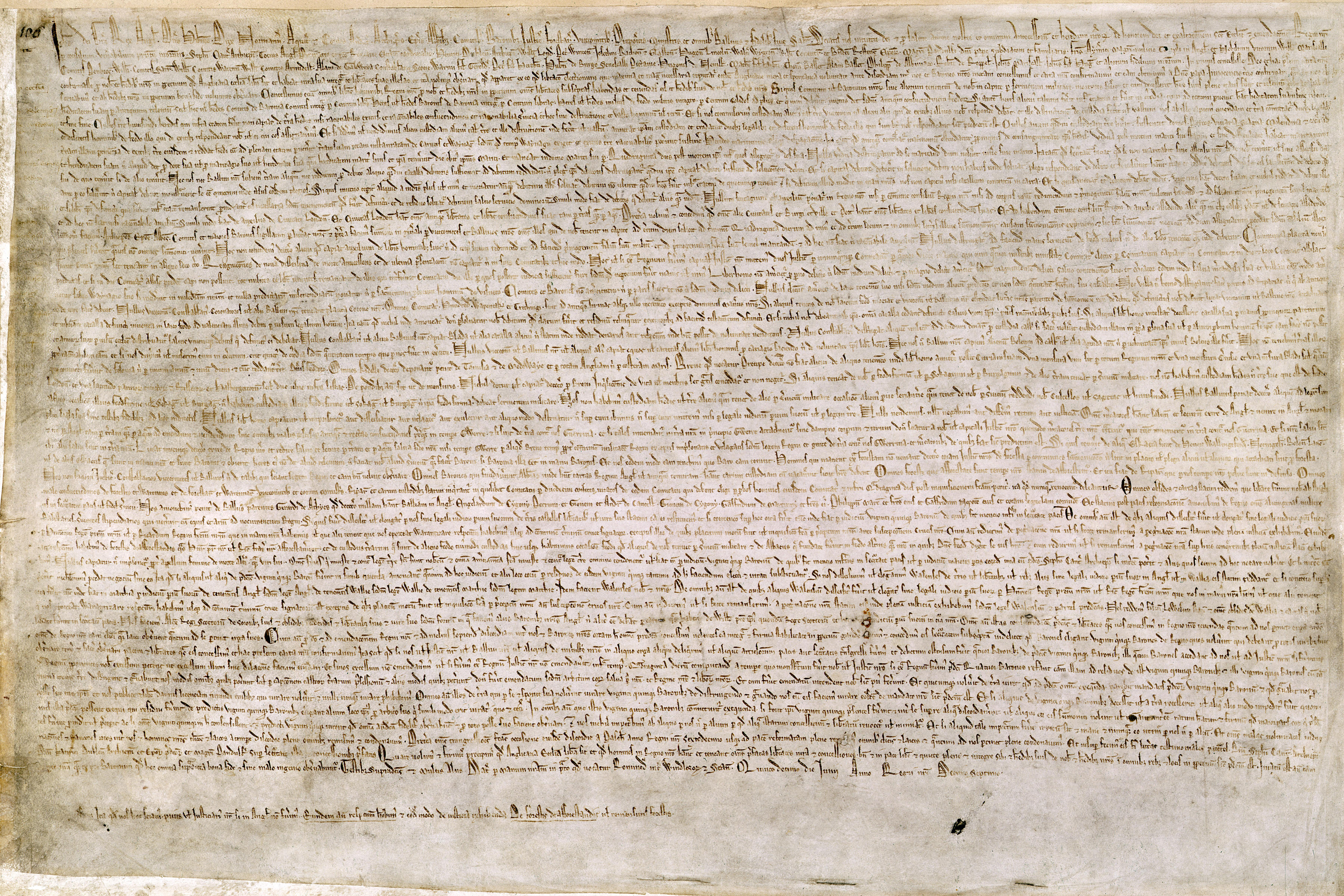
Magna Carta in 1215 began the process of abolishing the alienation of land in favour of the Church for the purpose of avoiding feudal incidents. The Great Charter of 1217 forbade the practice outright.

Giving land to the Church had a long and contentious history in England. Prior to the Norman Conquest of 1066, the Anglo-Saxon state and the Church were often synonymous. The local bishop or priest might also sit in judgment of civil and criminal cases in the royal courts. The Normans created a strict separation of Church and state. William the Conqueror encouraged this separation, yet was enthusiastic about the role the Church played in moral matters.

As a result, a two-tier legal system developed: the ecclesiastical courts and the Royal courts (the latter being now known as the Common Law courts). Jurisdiction was frequently blurred. A petitioner not receiving a satisfactory result in one court could re-file the case in the other. Writs of prohibition were frequently issued by common law courts to bar the reissuing of a case in a Church court. Bracton considered it a sin for a man to pledge to live by the decision of a common law court, only to re-issue it in a Church court because the first court had ruled against him.

The practice of pledging land to the Church was governed by the laws of frankalmoin under the Normans. There were two reasons to do so: gratitude toward the Church, but also to avoid feudal services and taxes. Once land had been pledged to the Church, it was difficult or impossible for the overlord to extract his former dues from the land.

Bracton considered the outcome of this, in a case where the tenant made a gift into frankalmoin – a gift of land to the Church. A feudal right of wardship would now be of no value at all, as no minority (ownership of the land by a minor) could thereafter arise. An escheat of the land (reclaiming of the land by the overlord, for want of an heir) theoretically allowed the lord to take back control of it; but placing the land in frankalmoin left it in the hands of a group of lawyers or others who allowed the use of the land by a religious foundation: the overlord would have only nominal control of this corporation, as it had never entered into a feudal homage arrangement with him; the corporation thus owed nothing to the overlord, so did not pay him homage. Bracton was sympathetic to this arrangement. According to him, the lord was not really injured as his rights to the land remained unscathed. It is true that they had been significantly diminished, as he had suffered damnum; but there had been no injuria (damnum absque injuria). Bracton was (rightly) of the view that a gift of land to the Church could be voided only by the donor's heirs, not by the overlord.

Once land had passed into the control of the Church, it could never be relinquished. Since the Church never died, the land could never be inherited on death (so no fine could be levied for the entry of the heir), nor could it be escheated to the lord (forfeited for want of an heir). This came to be known as the "dead hand" (French: mortmain) – either the Church (a non-living corporation) represented this dead hand, or the hand was that of the dead donor, who in effect still controlled the land by his original gift of it. Thus did the actions of men who had died generations before continue to control their former lands.

Magna Carta (the Great Charter) of 1217 struck down certain practices to which the Church was privy. Collusion, in making a gift of the land to a religious body (so as to evade feudal service), in return for an immediate re-letting of it by that body to the donor, was forbidden. This law was undermined in practice by the Chief Justice of the kingdom, Coke, whose courts interpreted the provision as though its only effect was to make the gift voidable by the donor's heirs. Coke held that it could not be voided by the donor's overlord, an opinion reiterated by Bracton.

The statute made provision in the following terms: "One is not to enfeoff a religious house and take back the land as a tenant of that house" (on the face of it, a ban on donating land to the Church on condition that it grant the donor a new tenancy thereof). The mischief aimed at by this arose because certain favoured religious bodies, such as the Knights Templar, possessed royal charters which, by general words therein, set free from any feudal burdens all the lands they possessed at the time of the granting of the charter, or thereafter acquired. Thus a man might give land to such a house, and in return be granted by it a tenancy of that same land, and as a tenant of the house he could now claim the immunity afforded by the charter. Thus did the gifting of land to a religious body free the tenant from his feudal duties to the overlord of the land.

King John's Great Charter of 1217 left no scope for granting land to the Church. But in spite of this his successor, Henry III, lavishly granted such licenses, despite that they were theoretically not allowed. The Great Charter, not being a statute but a mere administrative proclamation by the king, was binding only on the king's subjects, not on the king himself.

In 1258 at the Parliament in Oxford, the barons sought to preclude men of religion from entering into ownership of fees held from earls, barons and other lords without their consent, whereby the overlord lost forever the rights of wardship, marriage, relief and escheat, i.e. they were trying to use the authority of Parliament to bind the king with these provisions. In 1259 the Provisions of Westminster ordained that it shall not be lawful for men of religion to enter the fee of anyone without the permission of the lord from whom the land was held. The Provisions were alternately considered to be the law, then not rigorously enforced, depending upon who had greater political sway: the barons or the king. Most of the Provisions of Westminster were subsequently enacted, hence given greater authority, in the Statute of Marlborough in 1267, but not those relating to the gifting of fees to the Church. From this it may be inferred that the clergy had been influential with the king, who was then enjoying increased power over the barons.

The Statute of Marlborough was the nominal endpoint of the Second Barons' War, and underscored the victory of the king. The omission of restrictions on the Church can be directly traced to Henry III's sympathy for the clergy, according to Plucknett. In 1279 the statute De Viris Religiosis referred to the Provisions of Westminster as if they were settled law, whilst adding a restriction on alienations made in mortmain, discussed below.

By the 'Statute for Religious Men' of 1279, one of the so-called Statutes of Mortmain, no religious persons were permitted to acquire land. If they did so, the land was forfeited to the immediate overlord, and he had a brief period in which to take advantage of the forfeiture. If he failed to do so, the lord next above him in the feudal hierarchy had a similar opportunity. This right continued all the way up to the king. The statute did not merely abolish frankalmoin: ecclesiastical houses could no longer acquire land in any manner, even if they were willing to pay a full rent for it. Nevertheless, if the overlord was willing, land could still be gifted to a religious house with his complicity, i.e. by his inaction. And licenses from the king to acquire land in mortmain were easily obtained in those years, as Henry III was sympathetic to religious bodies during his long reign.

There had been a parallel French ordinance proclaimed in 1275. Henry III had a reputation of ruling by fiat – making royal proclamations on the spur of the moment. These were troublesome to both the secular and the church courts of the day, and efforts were made to curtail and limit this practice.

== Result of the Statutes of Mortmain ==
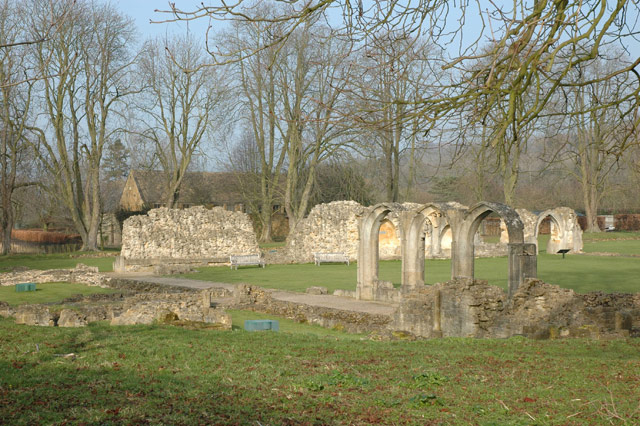
The ruins of Hailes Abbey in Gloucestershire, established about 1245 by Richard, Earl of Cornwall, the younger brother of Henry III.

During the long reign of Henry III, the donation of land to the Church became increasingly common. A feudal tenant would typically practice collusion with the Church in order to defeat a claim by his overlord for feudal services, by donating the land to a religious foundation on condition of it granting him a fresh tenancy of that land. The Great Charter of 1217 contained the first direct provision against this practice:

It shall not be lawful for anyone henceforth to give his land to any religious house in order to resume it again to hold of the house; nor shall it be lawful for any religious house to accept anyone's land and to return it to him from whom they received it. If anyone for the future shall give his land in this way to any religious house and be convicted thereof, the gift shall be quashed and the land forfeit to the lord of the fee.

Several cases are recorded where the king specifically forbade the tenant from alienating a church or land held in perpetuity by the Crown, and thus presumably the equivalent of mortmain. These cases are dated 1164, 1221 and 1227. After 1217, there was a forfeiture of the land to the overlord in a case of unauthorized alienation in mortmain. However, Henry III showed conspicuous favour to the Church and left the proclamations of 1215 and 1217 made by King John largely unenforced. The proscription was reintroduced, and made more forcible, by Henry III's son, Edward I, by the Statutes of Mortmain in 1279 and 1290.

However, all of these attempts at proscription were ineffective. Land could instead be left to the Church by the development of the new device of the cestui que use. Henry VII expended much energy in the courts trying to break the legal grip of "uses" by Church corporations. The Statute of Uses, passed three centuries after the Statutes of Mortmain, would attempt – with only partial success – to end the practice of the cestui que use. Henry VIII would resolve the problem of Church lands once and for all, in 1535, by dissolving the monasteries and confiscating all Church lands.

== See also ==
- Quia Emptores
- Cestui que
- Investiture Controversy
- Concordat of Worms
- Charter of Liberties
- First Council of the Lateran
- History of English land law
- List of English statutes
