= Alienation (property law) =

Legal terminology

In property law, alienation is the voluntary act of an owner of some property to convey or transfer the property to another. Alienability is the quality of being alienable, i.e., the capacity for a piece of property or a property right to be sold or otherwise transferred from one party to another. Most property is alienable, but some may be subject to restraints on alienation.

Some objects are now regarded as ineligible for becoming property and thus termed inalienable, such as people and body parts. Aboriginal title is one example of inalienability (save to the Crown) in common law jurisdictions. A similar concept is non-transferability, such as tickets. Rights commonly described as a licence or permit are generally only personal and are not assignable. However, they are alienable in the sense that they can generally be surrendered.

In England under the feudal system, land was generally transferred by subinfeudation, and alienation required license from the overlord. When William Blackstone published Commentaries on the Laws of England between 1765 and 1769, he described the principal object of English real property laws as the law of inheritance, which maintained the cohesiveness and integrity of estates through generations and thus secured political power within families. In 1833, Justice Joseph Story in his Commentaries on the Constitution of the United States linked landowners' jealous watchfulness of their rights and spirit of resistance in the American Revolutionary War with the system of American institutions which recorded and clarified land title and expanded landed markets. Other early American legal commentators who praised the simple and relatively inexpensive conveyancing system in the new United States included Zaphaniah Swift, Daniel Webster and James Kent.

English common law traditionally protected freehold landowners from unsecured creditors. In 1732, the Parliament of Great Britain passed legislation entitled “The Act for the More Easy Recovery of Debts in His Majesty’s Plantations and Colonies in America”, sometimes known as the Debt Recovery Act 1732 (5 Geo. 2. c. 7), which required all land and slave property in British America to be treated as chattel for debt collection purposes. It thus removed the shield from creditors which had protected large, landed estates (and which continued to protect those estates in Britain). However, the act was amended within a decade to allow colonial legislatures, particularly in the southern American colonies, to again protect real estate transferred in fee tail or inherited through primogeniture. Thus, colonies which relied on enslaved labor adopted legislation which promoted the liquidity of slave property. Although Virginia repealed laws supporting primogeniture and the fee tail in 1776, it refused to extend the Debt Recovery Act 1732 after the American Revolution, and passed further legislation which protected real estate from creditors. Other states adopted similar legislation (some specifically protected homesteads from creditors), but the recording systems adopted throughout the new American states led to the more commodified and transferable development of American property law. In 1797, Parliament passed the Negroes Act 1797 (37 Geo. 3. c. 119) which repealed the Debt Recovery Act 1732 with respect to slaves in the remaining colonies. Nonetheless, by 1806, abolition pamphleteers in Britain continued to criticize as cruel the act's sanction of slave auctions to satisfy a slaveowner's secured as well as unsecured debts.

== See also ==
- First-sale doctrine
- Inalienable rights
- Quia Emptores
