= Computo =

In archaic law, a computo was a writ, thus called from its effect, which was to compel a person to yield their accounts. It was made and enforceable against the following persons:

- Executors of executors
- The guardian in socage, for waste such as major dilapidations made or suffered in the minority (under legal age period) of the heir
- A bailiff
- A chamberlain
- A receiver
