= Mark system =

The mark system is a social organization that rests on the common tenure and common cultivation of the land by small groups of freemen. Both politically and economically the mark was an independent community, and its earliest members were doubtless blood relatives. In its origin the word is the same as mark or march, a boundary. First used in this sense, it was then applied to the land cleared by the settlers in the forest areas of Germany, and later it was used for the system which prevailed to what extent or for how long is uncertain in that country. It is generally assumed that the lands of the mark were divided into three portions; forest, meadow and arable, and as in the manorial system which was later in vogue elsewhere, a system of rotation of crops in two, three or even six fields was adopted, each member of the community having rights of pasture in the forest and the meadow, and a certain share of the arable.

The mark was a self-governing community. Its affairs were ordered by the markmen who met together at stated times in the markmoot. Soon, however, their freedom was encroached upon, and in the course of a very short time it disappeared altogether.

== Controversy ==
The extent and nature of the mark system has been, and still is, a subject of controversy among historians. One school holds that it was almost universal in Germany; that it was, in fact, the typical Teutonic method of holding and cultivating the land. From Germany, it is argued, it was introduced by the Angle and Saxon invaders into England, where it was extensively adopted, being the foundation upon which the prevailing land system in early England was built.

An opposing school denies entirely the existence of the mark system, and a French writer, Fustel de Coulanges, refers to it contemptuously as a figment of the Teutonic imagination. This view is based largely upon the supposition that common ownership of the land was practically unknown among the early Germans, and was by no means general among the early English. The complete mark system was certainly not prevalent in Anglo-Saxon England, nor did it exist very widely, or for any very long period in Germany, but the system which did prevail in these two countries contained elements which are also found in the mark system.

== See also ==
- Quia Emptores
