= Mortmain =

Perpetual ownership of real estate

Mortmain (/ˈmɔːrtmeɪn/) is the perpetual, inalienable ownership of real estate by a corporation or legal institution; the term is usually used in the context of its prohibition. Historically, the land owner usually would be the religious office of a church; today, insofar as mortmain prohibitions against perpetual ownership still exist, it refers most often to modern companies and charitable trusts. The term mortmain is derived from Medieval Latin mortua manus, literally "dead hand", through Old French morte main (in modern French, mainmorte).

== History ==
During the Middle Ages in Western European countries such as England, the Roman Catholic Church acquired a substantial amount of real estate. As the Church and religious orders were each recognised as a legal person separate from the office holder who administered the Church land (such as the abbot or the bishop), the land would not escheat on the death of the holder, or pass by inheritance, as the Church and the religious orders would not die. The land was held in perpetuity. This was in contrast to feudal practice in which the nobility would hold land granted by the king in return for service, especially service in war. Over time, the Church gained a large share of land in many feudal states; this was a cause of increasing tension between the Church and the Crown.

In 1279, and again in 1290, Statutes of Mortmain were enacted under King Edward I to impose limits on the Church's holding of property, although limits on the Church's power to hold land are also found in earlier statutes, including Magna Carta (1215) and the Provisions of Westminster (1259). The broad effect of these provisions was that the authorisation of the Crown was needed before the land could vest perpetually in a corporation. As an example of the response of the institutions, the chartulary of Chertsey Abbey records that "shortly after one of these statutes vulgarly called Mortmain" 11 acres (4.5 ha) in Ash, Surrey, were held by Robert de Zathe with sufficient common pasture for his flocks and herds, while Geoffrey de Bacsete and his brother William had 28 acres (11 ha).

Corporate mortmain is still lawful in many countries today. In a person's making of their own trusts, provisions and settlements, to newly proposed founded bodies or groups of persons, there are commonly still laws against perpetuities, preventing their "dead hand" from prevailing more than, for example, 80 years and there is the common law rule in Saunders v Vautier enabling all of the adult beneficiaries to draw special legal agreements together to override any historic provisions. See rule against perpetuities—rules vary by jurisdiction.

Mortmain was a key underlying interdiction in legal history, contextualising much early case law. The decision of Thornton v Howe (1862) 31 Beav 14 held that a trust for publishing the writings of Joanna Southcott was charitable, being for the "advancement of religion". This decision is often held up as setting the bar extremely low in determining whether a charity is for the advancement of religion. At the time of her trust-making the statutes against mortmain were in force (pre-dating the Law of Property Amendment Act 1860 piloted by Lord Cozens-Hardy) and having not met the narrow, high-authority formalities for such a trust to be valid it was void, rather than imbuing it with special privileges in relation to taxation and viability. Identifying the trust within the general run of mortmain forbiddance shapes the case's reasoning (ratio).

== Etymology ==
William Blackstone wrote, in 1765, "The reason of [this] appellation Sir Edward Coke offers many conjectures; but there is one which seems more probable than any that he has given us: viz. that these purchases being usually made by ecclesiastical bodies, the members of which (being professed) were reckoned dead persons in law, land therefore, holden by them, might with great propriety be said to be held in mortua manu. [in dead hands]."

== See also ==
- Rule against perpetuities
- Cestui que
- Statutes of Mortmain
- Waqf, the Islamic equivalent of mortmain
