= Quia Emptores =

English statute of 1290

- Act of Parliament
- Parliament of England
- Long title: A Statute of our Lord The King, concerning the Selling and Buying of Land.
- Citation: 18 Edw. 1. c. 1
- Territorial extent: England and Wales; Ireland

Other legislation
- Amended by: Charities Act 1960

Status: Amended

Text of statute as originally enacted

Revised text of statute as amended

Text of the Quia Emptores as in force today (including any amendments) within the United Kingdom, from legislation.gov.uk.

Quia Emptores is a statute passed by the Parliament of England in 1290 during the reign of Edward I that prevented tenants from alienating (transferring) their lands to others by subinfeudation, instead requiring all tenants who wished to alienate their land to do so by substitution. The statute, along with its companion statute Quo Warranto also passed in 1290, was intended to remedy land ownership disputes and consequent financial difficulties that had resulted from the decline of the traditional feudal system in England during the High Middle Ages. The name Quia Emptores derives from the first two words of the statute in its original mediaeval Latin, which can be translated as "because the buyers". Its long title is A Statute of our Lord The King, concerning the Selling and Buying of Land. It is also cited as the Statute of Westminster III, one of many English and British statutes with that title.

Prior to the passage of Quia Emptores, tenants could either subinfeudate their land to another, which would make the new tenant their vassal, or substitute it, which would sever the old tenant's ties to the land completely and substitute the new tenant for the old with regards to obligations to the immediate overlord concerned. Subinfeudation would prove problematic so was banned by the statute.

By effectively ending the practice of subinfeudation, Quia Emptores hastened the end of feudalism in England, although it had already been on the decline for quite some time. Direct feudal obligations were increasingly being replaced by cash rents and outright sales of land which gave rise to the practice of livery and maintenance or bastard feudalism; the retention and control by the nobility of land, money, soldiers and servants via direct salaries; and land sales and rent payments. By the mid-fifteenth century the major nobility were able to assemble estates, sums of money and private armies on retainer through post-Quia Emptores land management practices and direct sales of land. It is thought by historians such as Charles Plummer that this then developed into one of the possible underlying causes of the Wars of the Roses. Other sources indicate the essence of bastard feudalism as early as the 11th century in the form of livery and maintenance, and that elements of classical feudalism are significant as late as the 15th century.

As of 2025 the statute remains in force in England and Wales. It was repealed in the Republic of Ireland in 2009. It had an impact in Australia, as well as colonial America and thereby the modern United States.

== Nomenclature ==
Quia Emptores, translatable as "because of the buyers" and traditionally translated into English as "Forasmuch as the Purchasers", are the first two words of the statute in its mediaeval Latin. It is used in the statute to announce its intent and background, the "Purchasers" referring to subinfeudators whom the statute was trying to counteract.

The statute is given the Latin title Statute qd null emat tras de aliis tenend qa de capitalibz dnis, &c. on the Close Roll. It is known as the Statutum Westm. iij. The Statute of Westminster the Third, viz. of Quia Emptores Terrarum in the Printed Copies and Translations. In The Statutes of the Realm it is given the Latin title Statutu[m] d[omi]ni R[egis] de t[er]ris vendend[o] et emend[o], with a corresponding English title "A Statute of our Lord The King, concerning the Selling and Buying of Land". Its citation is 18 Edw. 1. c. 1.

== Background ==
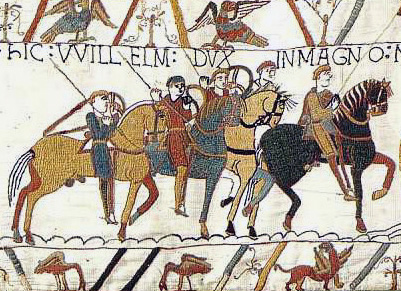
The Normans mandated primogeniture inheritance; here William Duke of Normandy is shown in the Bayeux Tapestry.

Prior to the Norman Conquest of England in 1066, the Anglo-Saxon law of land succession was customary. Land, or folkland as it was called, was held in allodial title by a family or clan, meaning the group collectively held the land. It was probably of little relevance when the titular head of the clan or family died - traditional lands probably continued to be held by the community. The exact nature of allodialism as it existed in Anglo-Saxon England has been debated, but to no definitive end. It has been argued that in the mark system Saxon allodialism was a highly idealistic socialist/communitarian state. Numa Denis Fustel de Coulanges, in his essay "The Origins of Property in Land", and Frederic William Maitland both criticised this view and found it to be inconsistent with extant Anglo-Saxon documents from pre-Norman times.

After the Conquest, the rule became one of primogeniture inheritance, meaning the eldest surviving son became the sole heir of the baronial estate. The intent of primogeniture inheritance was to keep large land holdings in the hands of a relatively few, trustworthy lords. The other sons could be accommodated by becoming under-lords to the surviving heir. The eldest would accept the younger brothers "in homage" in return for their allegiance. This was a process called subinfeudation. Even commoners could subinfeudate to their social inferiors. Large pieces of land were given to the great lords by the Norman Crown. Land title under William I was a life tenure, meaning the land would pass back to the Crown upon the death of the lord. These lands were then subinfeudated to lesser lords. Landholdings in England were of this pattern: large land grants issued to the great lords by the Crown. These were divided up among the younger sons, who then subinfeudated them to lesser lords and commoners. These in turn "accepted in homage" their lessers who held even smaller parcels of land. Determining who owed what feudal incidences filled the court dockets for generations. With the passage of time, land tenures came to be inherited by the survivors of the great lords upon their deaths. Accompanying the Norman change in inheritance was a recognition of the ability of even the lowest of landholders the right of inheritance. In the 12th century, this custom was extended to the commoners. It was discovered that granting an interest in the passage of land to their children, commoners would tend the land with greater economy. The children of tenants were assured their inheritance in the land. This also meant, as a practicality, the land could be sold or bequeathed to the Church. The ancient method of the Normans was a grant to the Church in frankalmoin.

In English law after the Conquest, the lord remained a grantor after the grant of an estate in fee-simple. There was no land in England without its lord: "Nulle terre sans seigneur" was the feudal maxim. These grants were in turn subject to subinfeudation. The principal incidents of a seignory were an oath of fealty, a quit or chief rent; a relief of one year's quit rent, and the right of escheat. In return, for these privileges the lord was liable to forfeit his rights if he neglected to protect and defend the tenant or did anything injurious to the feudal relation. The word "fee" is associated with the Norman feudal system and is in contradistinction to the Anglo-Saxon allodial system.

At the time of the Conquest, William the Conqueror granted fiefs to his lords in the manner of a continental or feudal benefice which assured little beyond a life tenure. The English charters were careful to avoid saying the donee was to take the estate for life, or whether the heir was to have any rights. At this time, there is abundant evidence that lords refused to regrant on any terms to the deceased tenant's heirs; the deed phrase "to [A] and his heirs and assigns" is the product of efforts by purchasers to preserve such rights on behalf of those who might inherit or purchase the land from them. The practice of demanding a monetary payment for regranting of tenancy to the heirs quickly became the norm.

In 1100, the Charter of Liberties of Henry I of England contained the clause:

If any of my earls, barons or other tenants in chief die, his heir shall not redeem his land as he did in the time of my brother [i.e. William II of England], but shall take it up with a just and lawful relief. The men of my barons shall take up (relevabunt) their lands from their lords with a just and lawful relief.

Relief later was set at a rate per fee in Magna Carta. By the time of Bracton, it was settled law that the word "fee" connoted inheritability and the maximum of legal ownership.

=== Magna Carta and the Great Charter of 1217 ===
The Magna Carta of 1215 gave little mention of the rights of alienation. It contained 60 chapters, and represented the extreme form of baronial demands. John managed to receive a bull from Pope Innocent III annulling the Magna Carta. Magna Carta was effective law for about nine weeks. King John of England died shortly after that in 1216. The council which ruled in the name of the infant Henry III of England re-issued the charter in 1216, this time with papal assent. It was very much modified in favour of the Crown. The third Great Charter in 1217 is the first document of a legislative kind that expressly mentioned any restraint of alienation in favour of the lord. It says: "No free man shall henceforth give or sell so much of his land as that out of the residue he may not sufficiently do to the lord of the fee the service which pertains to that fee."

It was determined during the minority rule of Henry III that the Crown should not be limited, hence the compromises seen in the Charters of 1216 and 1217. In 1225, Henry III came of age, and a fourth Great Charter was issued, which varied only slightly from the third Charter. The charter deals with land law in Chapters 7, 32 and 36. The rights of widows were protected and landowners were forbidden to alienate so much of their land that the lord of the fee suffered detriment. Collusive gifts to the Church (which were frequently made in order to evade feudal service) were forbidden. Coke interprets this as though its only effect was to make the excessive gift voidable by the donor's heir. It certainly could not be voided by the donor's lord. This opinion was reiterated by Bracton.

=== Alienation by serfs and peasants ===
The use of land by tenants (serfs and peasants) was more difficult. Some families stayed on the land for generations. When the nominal head of the family died, it was usually of little consequence to the lord, or the owners of the title to the land. The practice of socage whereby the peasants pledged a payment (either in agricultural goods or money) for the privilege to inhabit and farm the land became the standard practice. After the payment, the peasant was considered "soked", that is, paid in full.

The right to inherit was quickly followed by the right to alienation, i.e. the right to sell the inheritance to an outside party.

Disputes arose when a family member wanted to leave inherited land to the Church, or wanted to sell the land to a third party. Questions concerning the rights of the overlord and the other family members were frequently heard in the courts prior to Quia Emptores. In general, it was held that a donor should pay the other parties who had an interest to give them relief. However, the results were haphazard and the rulings of various courts were patchwork, and there was little established stare decisis from jurisdiction to jurisdiction. This difficulty is illustrated in statements made by Ranulf de Glanvill (died 1190), the chief Justiciar of Henry II:

Every freeman, therefore, who holds land can give a certain part in marriage with his daughter or any other woman whether he has an heir or not, and whether the heir is willing or not, and even against the opposition and claim of such an heir. Every man, moreover, can give a certain part of his free tenement to whomsoever he will as a reward to his service, or in charity to a religious place, in such wise that if seisin has followed upon the gift it shall remain perpetually to the donee and his heirs if it were granted by hereditary right. But if seisin did not follow upon the gift it cannot be maintained after the donor's death against the will of the heir, for it is to be construed rather than a true promise of a gift. It is moreover generally lawful for a man to give during his lifetime a reasonable part of his land to whomsoever he will according to his fancy, but this does not apply to deathbed gifts, for the donor might then, (if such gifts were allowed) make an improvident distribution of his patrimony as a result of a sudden passion or failing reason, as frequently happens. However, a gift made to anyone in a last will can be sustained if it was made with the consent of the heir and confirmed by him.

It has been commented that this illustrates a desire in Glanvill's time to formalise the practices of the day, in which someone having a tenancy could dispose of his land before death. While several problems were addressed (land given in marriage, land given on a whim, or on a death bed), the rules were still vague, when compared to similar cases in contemporaneous France. In the latter, strict rules had arisen defining exact amounts which could be allotted in situations such as "alienation of one-third, or alienation of one-half" of a patrimony or conquest. Glanvill is imprecise, using terms such as "a reasonable amount" and "a certain part".

The issue of alienation of serjeanty had been settled long before Quia Emptores. In 1198 the itinerant justices were directed to make an inquiry into the nature of the King's serjeanties. This was repeated in 1205 by King John who ordered the seizure of all Lancaster serjeanties, thegnages and drengages that had been alienated since the time of Henry II of England. These could not be alienated without a royal licence. The Charter of 1217 reaffirmed this doctrine. Henry III of England issued an important ordinance in 1256. In it the King asserted that it was an intolerable invasion of royal rights that men should, without his special consent, enter, by way of purchase or otherwise, the baronies and fees that were holden to him in chief. Anyone who defied the decree was subject to seizure by the sheriff. Later case law indicates jurists remained largely ignorant of this decree, which suggests the Crown was reluctant to enforce it.

It became common practice to subinfeudate to the younger sons. There are cases from the time, in which a writ of the court was granted demanding that the eldest, inheriting son be forced to "accept in homage" the younger sons as a way of enforcing their subinfeudation. As there had been no survey of land titles since the Domesday Book over 200 years earlier, outright title to land had become seriously clouded in many cases and was often in dispute. The whole feudal structure was a patchwork of smaller land holders. Although the history of the major landholding lords is fairly well recorded, the nature of the smaller landholders has been difficult to reconstruct.

Some direction toward order had been laid down in the Magna Carta, the Provisions of Oxford, and in the scanty legislation of Simon de Montfort, 6th Earl of Leicester. Edward I set about to rationalise and modernise the law during his thirty-five year reign. The first period, from 1272 to 1290, consisted of the enactment of Statute of Westminster 1275 (3 Edw. 1) and the Statute of Gloucester 1278 (6 Edw. 1), and the incorporation of recently conquered Wales into the realm. These were followed by the Statute Quo Warranto and the Statutum de Viris Religiosis, 7 Edw. 1). The latter was designed to stop the increasing amount of lands which were ending up in Church ownership. The Statute of Westminster 1285 (13 Edw. 1. St. 1) contained the clause De Donis Conditionalibus which shaped the system of entailing estates. The Statute of Winchester was passed in 1285. This was followed by Quia Emptores (1290), which was only about 500 words in length.

=== Alienation prior to Quia Emptores ===
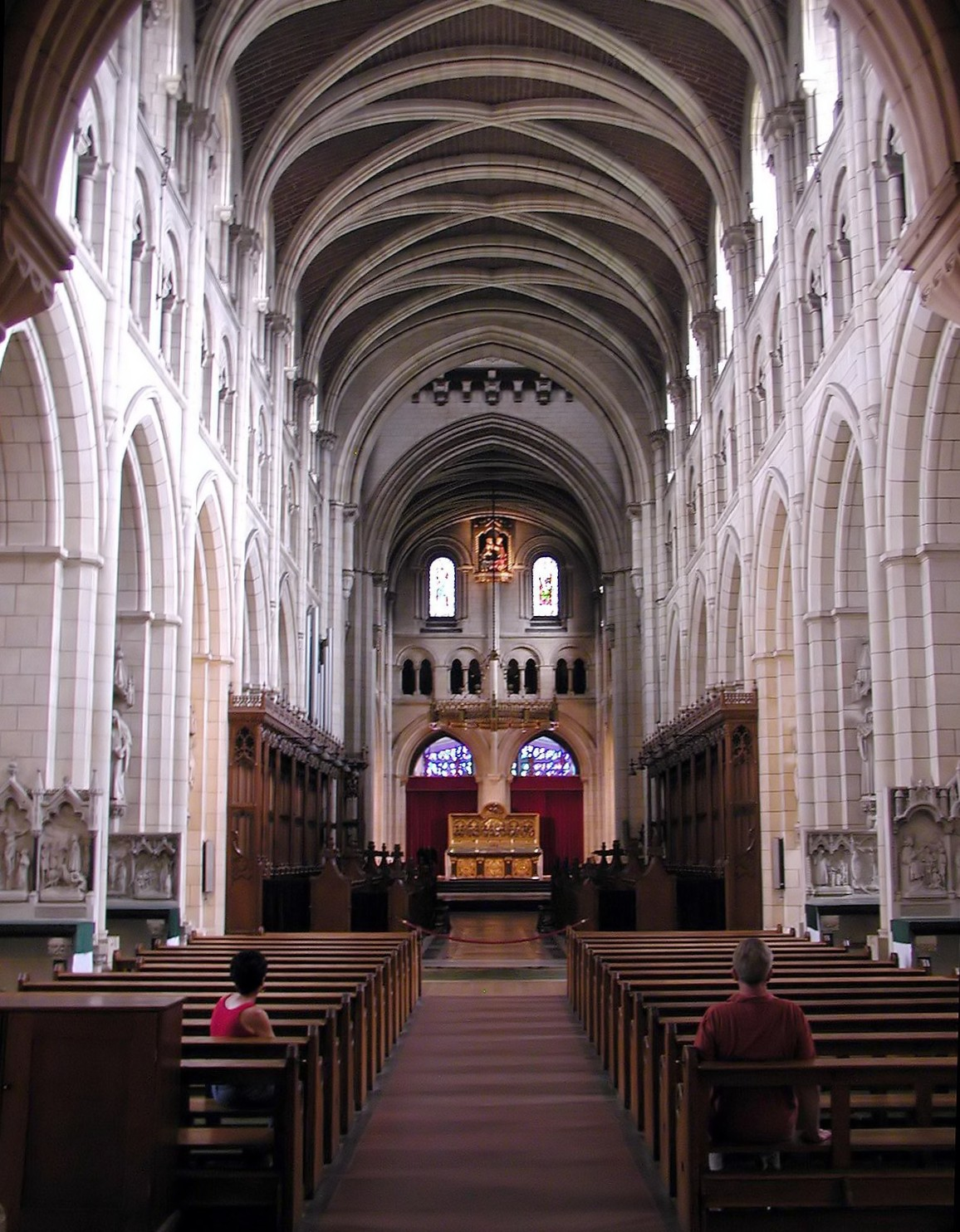
Buckfast Abbey in Devon as rebuilt. It originated on land donated by King Cnut in 1018, and became a Cistercian abbey in 1147.

It is the opinion of Pollock and Maitland that in the middle of the 13th century the tenant enjoyed a large power of disposing of his tenement by act inter vivos, though this was subject to some restraints in favour of his lord. Other opinions have been expressed. Coke regarded the English tradition as one of ancient liberty dictated by custom. The tenant had relative freedom to alienate all or part of his estate. Blackstone was of a differing conclusion. The "learning of feuds" started with the inalienability of the fief as a starting point. Gradually, the powers of the tenant grew at the expense of the lord. Pollock & Maitland (1968) believe Coke's opinion to be the more valid one. Both views may have been true. Modern scholars may have given more weight to the written and declared law of the Normans than existed in reality.

For some time, two kinds of alienation had been occurring. These were "substitution" and "subinfeudation". In substitution, the tenant would alienate his land and the attendant duties owed to the lord. After alienation, the tenant expected nothing from the new tenant, other than the price of the alienation. In subinfeudation, the new tenant would become a vassal owing feudal duties to the person who alienated. The previous tenant would become the lord to the new tenant. Both these practices had the effect of denying the great lord of the land his rights of feudal estate. The bond of homage was between lord and servant. It was difficult for the medieval mind to think of this in any terms other than as a personal bond. The idea that a feudal bond could be bought or sold was repugnant to the ruling class. All the same, the practice of alienation of rights to the land had been going on in England for some centuries. A tenant who was accepted in homage by the lord could "subinfeudate" to one or more under-tenants. It was difficult or impossible for the overlord to extract any services (such as knight service, rent, homage) from the new tenants. They had no bond to the overlord. Pollock & Maitland (1968) give the following example: In the case of subinfeudation, the old tenant was liable for services to the lord. If A enfeoffed to B to hold a knight's service, and then B enfeoffed C to hold as a rent of a pound of pepper per year; B dies leaving an heir within age; A is entitled to a wardship; but it will be worth very little: instead of being entitled to enjoy the land itself until the heir is of age, he will get a few annual pounds of pepper. Instead of enjoying the land by escheat, he will only receive a trifling rent. Quia Emptores in 1290 ended all subinfeudation and made all alienation complete. Once a sale of land was made, the new owner was responsible for all feudal incidents.

=== Glanvill on alienation ===
Glanvill gives no indication that a tenant needed the lord's consent to alienate his rights to land. He does speak at length of the rights of expectant heirs, and this should cause some restraints on alienation. He also says the rights of the lord must be considered. It can be inferred from Glanvill that no substitution could occur without the consent of the lord.

=== Bracton on alienation ===
Bracton gives several examples of escheat occurring by a mesne lord (middle lord in the feudal structure): A enfeoffs B at a rent of 10 shillings. B enfeoffs C at a rent of 5 shillings. B dies without an heir. Is A entitled to 5, 10 or 15 shillings a year? While it can be argued that A is entitled to 15 shillings, it was Bracton's opinion that A should only be awarded 10 shillings. Bracton held this problem to be without solution: Is A entitled to the wardship of C's heir, if C held of B in socage, and B, whose rights have escheated to A, and held of A by knight's service.

The worst case occurred when the tenant made a gift of frankalmoin – a gift of land to the Church. A wardship would be of no value at all. An escheat of the land (a reclamation of the land by the overlord) would allow the owner to take control of the land. But the act of placing the land in frankalmoin left it in the hands of a group of lawyers or others who allowed the use of the land by a Church organisation. The overlord would have nominal control of the corporation which had never entered into a feudal homage arrangement. The corporation owed nothing to the overlord. Bracton was sympathetic to this arrangement. According to him the lord is not really injured. His rights to the land remain unscathed. It is true they have been significantly diminished. He had suffered damnum, but there had been no iniuria. Bracton was of the opinion that a gift of land to the Church could be voided by the heirs, but not the lord.

Throughout his work, Bracton shows a prejudice in favour of free alienation. Concerning subinfeudation, he argues that it does no wrong, though it may clearly do damage to the lords on occasion. It has been difficult to determine how much of this opinion is based on Bracton's prejudice, and how much it corresponded to actual practice.

Bracton considers this problem: A enfeoffs to B to hold by a certain service and that B enfeoffs to C to hold the whole or part of the tenement by a less service. The law permits A to distrain C for the service due from B, but this violated equity. Then as to substitutions, even when B has done homage to A, nevertheless B may give A a new tenant by enfeoffing C to hold of A, and C will then hold of A whether A is agreeable to it or not. Bracton does not even expressly allow A to object that C is his personal enemy, or too poor to do the service. Pollock & Maitland (1968) consider this remarkable since Bracton does allow that the lord cannot substitute for himself in the bond of homage a new lord who is the enemy of the tenant, or too needy to fulfil the duties of warranty.

== The statute ==
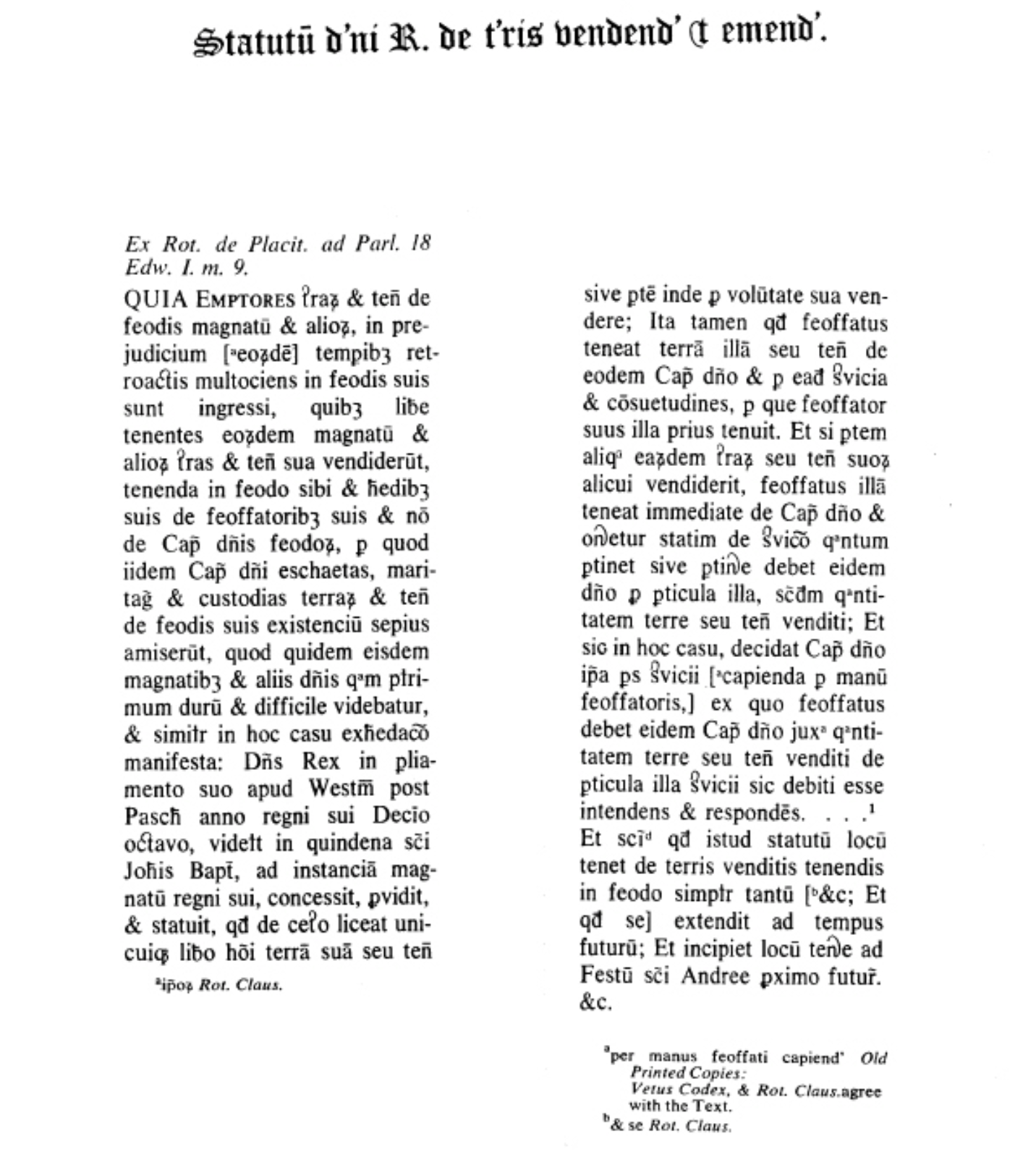
Quia Emptores, in original medieval Latin

Quia Emptores was a kind of legislative afterthought meant to rectify confusion in:

- land tenure
- frankalmoign
- subinfeudation
- mesne lords
- petty serjeanty
- substitution
- apportionment
- economic delusion

It indirectly affected the practices of:

- distraint (also called: distress or districtio), previously legislated for in the Statute of Marlborough (1267)
- escheat
- wardship
- marriage
- socage

The statute provided that subtenants could not be allowed to alienate land to other persons while retaining the nominal possession and feudal rights over it. The seller had to relinquish all rights and duties to the new buyer, and retained nothing. This was the end of subinfeudation. The middle lords or mesne lords (who could be common persons) and had granted land for service to those lower on the social scale could no longer come into existence. After Quia Emptores, every existing seignory must have been created prior to the enactment of the statute. The old feudal sequence was: the King granted land to a great lord, who then granted to lesser lords or commoners, who in turn repeated the process, becoming lesser lords (mesne lords) themselves. This was subinfeudation. The effect was to make the transfer of land a completely commercial transaction, and not one of feudalism. There were no provisions placed upon the Crown.

Quia Emptores mandated that when land was alienated, the grantee was required to assume all tax and feudal obligations of the original tenant, known as substitution.

Quia Emptores addressed the question of outright sales of land rights. It declared that every freeman might sell his tenement or any part of it, but in such a manner that the feoffee should hold the same lord and by the same services, of whom and by which the feoffor held. In case only a part was sold, the services were to be apportioned between the part sold and the part retained in accordance with their quantities.

Nothing in the statutes addressed the King's rights, and tenants in chief of the crown continued to need royal licence to alienate their estates. On the contrary, at the time the right of alienation by substitution was being set in Statute, the King's claim to restrain any alienation by his tenants was strengthened.

Quia Emptores ended the ancient practice of frankalmoign whereby lands could be donated to a Church organisation to be held in perpetuity. Frankalmoign created a tenure whereby the holder (the Church) was exempt from all services, except trinoda necessitas (bridge and road repair, militia service, and fortification building and repair). Quia Emptores allowed no new tenure in frankalmoign, except by the Crown. The issues arising from frankalmoign had been addressed by the Statute of Mortmain. Quia Emptores took mortmain one step further by banning outright the formation of new tenures, except by the Crown.

== Legacy ==
While historians are still divided on whether Quia Emptores was a proactive or reactive measure, it is logical to conclude that Quia Emptores attempted to formalise practices of exchanging money for land, which had been going on for some centuries. There were other problems in inheritance which had festered since the time of William I. In a proclamation from 1066, William swept away the entire tradition of familial or allodial inheritance by claiming that "every child be his father's heir". The reality was different, and resulted in primogeniture inheritance. The reorganisation of the country along the lines of feudalism was both shocking and difficult. Traitors forfeited their land to the Crown. This principle was designed to weaken opposition to the Crown. Frequently, it punished innocent members of the traitor's family. There was a saying from Kent: "Father to the bough, son to the plough" (the father hanged for treason, the son forced to work the land [for survival]). The norm in Kent was that confiscated lands would be restored to the innocent family members. Seized lands throughout England were often restored to the family, despite what royal decrees may have indicated. It is arguable that the institution of inheritance and subsequent alienation rights by tenants ended feudalism in England. Quia Emptores only formalised that end. In essence, feudalism was turned on its head. The ones with the apparent rights were the tenant class, while the great lords were still beholden to the Crown.

In the opinion of Pollack and Maitland, it is a mistake to conclude that Quia Emptores was enacted in the interest of the great lords. The one person who had all to gain and nothing to lose was the King.

The Statute was considered a compromise. It allowed a continuance of the practice of selling (alienating) land, tenancy, rights and privileges for money or other value, but by substitution. One tenant could be replaced by many. In this, the great lords were forced to concede to the right of alienation to the tenants. They had been at risk of losing their services by apportionment and economic dilution. This practice had been going on for some time. Quia Emptores merely attempted to rationalise and control these practices. The great lords gained by ending the practice of subinfeudation with its consequent depreciation of escheat, wardship and marriage. History would indicate the great lords were winners as well as the Crown, since land bought from lowly tenants had a tendency to stay within their families, as has been noted above.

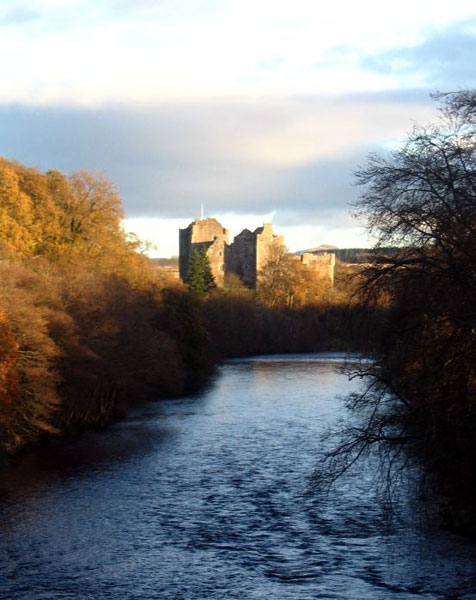
Quia Emptores allowed freemen to sell their rights to tenancy or rights of inheritance in land.

The process of escheat was affected by Quia Emptores. Expulsion of tenants from the land for failure to perform was always a difficult idea, and usually necessitated a lengthy court battle. The lord who escheated could not profit from the land, and had to hold it open for the tenant who could fulfil the obligation at a future date. Quia Emptores laid out, with some definition which had previously been lacking in the issue of tenures. In a sense, the old stereotypes were locked in place.

Every feoffment made by a new tenant could not be in frankalmoign, since the donee was a layman; it would be reckoned by the laws of socage. Socage grew at the expense of frankalmoign. The tenant in chief could not alienate without the license of the King. Petty serjeanty came to be treated as "socage in effect".

== Later history by jurisdiction ==
=== England and Wales ===
The statute of Quia Emptores does not apply to the creation of a leasehold estate or sub-letting, as a leasehold estate is not considered a feudal estate being neither inheritable (in the Middle Ages) nor (as it remains) capable of existing forever.

=== Ireland ===
The statute was repealed in Ireland by the Land and Conveyancing Law Reform Act, 2009.

=== Colonial America and the United States ===
- Grants of the English Colonies
- De Peyster v. Michael, New York
- Van Renssalaer v. Hayes, New York
- Miller v. Miller, Kansas
- Mandelbaum v. McDonnell, Michigan
- Cuthbert v. Kuhn, Pennsylvania
- New York State Constitution

The English colonies in North America were founded upon royal grants or licenses. Specifically, British colonisation of North America was by charter colony or proprietary colony. In this sense, they were founded upon the principles outlined by Quia Emptores. The territories were granted under conditions by which English law controlled private estates of land. The colonies were royal grants. An entire province, or any part of it, could be leased, sold or otherwise disposed of like a private estate. In 1664, the Duke of York sold New Jersey to Berkeley and Carteret. The sale was effected by deeds of lease and release. In 1708, William Penn mortgaged Pennsylvania, and under his will devising the province legal complications arose which necessitated a suit in chancery. Over time, Quia Emptores was suspended in the colonies. Arguably, certain aspects of it may still be in effect in some of the original colony states such as New York, Virginia, Maryland and Pennsylvania. However, like everything else involving Quia Emptores, opinion varies, and some element of confusion reigns. Some U.S. state court decisions have dealt with Quia Emptores. Prominent among these was the 1852 New York case of De Peyster v. Michael. There the court record is useful in describing the nature of English feudalism:

At common law a feoffment in fee did not originally pass an estate in the sense in which the term is now understood. The purchaser took only a usufructary interest, without the power of alienation in prejudice of the lord. In default of heirs, the tenure became extinct and the land reverted to the lord. Under the system of English feudal tenures, all lands in the Kingdom, were supposed to be holden mediately or immediately by the King who was styled the "lord paramount", or above all. Such tenants as held under the King immediately, when they granted out portions of their lands to inferior persons, also became lords with respect to those inferior persons, since they were still tenants with respect to the King, and thus partaking of a middle nature were called "mesne" or "middle lords". So, if the King granted a manor to A and A granted a portion of the land to B, now B was said to hold of A, and A of the King; or in other words, B held his lands immediately of A and mediately of the King. The King was therefore styled "Lord Paramount"; A was both tenant and lord, or a mesne lord, and B was called "tenant paravail", or the lowest tenant. Out of the feudal tenures or holdings sprung certain rights and incidents, among those which were fealty and escheat. Both these were incidents of socage tenure. Fealty is the obligation of fidelty which the tenant owed to the lord. Escheat was the reversion of the estate on a grant in fee simple upon a failure of the heirs of the owner. Fealty was annexed to and attendant on the reversion. They were inseparable. These incidents of feudal tenure belonged to the lord of whome the lands were immediately holden, that is to say, to him of whom the owner for the time being purchased. These grants were called subinfeudations.

In this case, the New York court offered the opinion that Quia Emptores had never been effective in the colonies. A different opinion was rendered by the New York court in the 1859 case of Van Rensselaer v. Hays (19 NY 68) where it was written that Quia Emptores had always been in effect in New York and all the colonies. There, the court noted:

In the early vigor of the feudal system, a tenant in fee could not alienate the feud without the consent of the immediate superior; but this extreme rigor was soon afterward relaxed, and it was avoided by the practice of subinfeudation, which consisted in the tenant enfeoffing another to hold of himself by the fealty and such services as might be reserved by the act of feoffment. Thus, a new tenure was created upon every alienation; and thus there arose a series of lords of the same lands, the first called the "chief lord" holding immediately of the sovereign, the next grade holding of them, and so on, each alienation creating another lord and another tenant. This practice was considered detrimental to the great lords, since it deprived them to a certain extent the fruits of their tenure, such as escheats, marriages, wardships and the like.

From 28 Am Jur 2nd Estates section 4:

The effect of Statute Quia Emptores is obvious. By declaring that every freeman might sell his lands at his own pleasure, it removed the feudal restraint which prevented the tenant from selling his land without the license of his grantor, who was his feudal lord. Hence by virtue of the Statute, passed in 1290, subinfeudation was abolished and all persons except the King's tenants in capite were left at liberty to alien all or any part of their lands at their own pleasure and discretion. Quia Emptores is by express wording, extended only to the lands held in fee simple. Included in its applications, however, are leases in fee and fee farmlands. Property in the U. S., with few exceptions, is allodial. This is by virtue of state constitutional provisions, organic territorial acts incorporated into legal systems of states subsequently organised, statutes and decisions of the courts. They are subject to escheat only in the event of failure of successors in ownership.

In the 1913 case of Miller v. Miller, the Supreme Court of Kansas stated: "Feudal tenures do not and cannot exist. All tenures in Kansas are allodial."

The Supreme Court of Michigan expressed the opinion that whether Quia Emptores ever became effectual in any part of the United States by express or implied adoption or as part of the common law did not have to be ascertained. It was clear that no such statute was ever needed in Michigan or in any of the western states because no possibility of reverter or escheat in the party conveying an estate ever existed. At all times, escheat could only accrue to the sovereign, which, in Michigan, is the state.

Quia Emptores was stated in 1838, by the Supreme Court of Pennsylvania, not to be in effect in that state.

The New York Constitution makes any question of Quia Emptores moot by stating: "all lands within this state are declared allodial, so that, subject only to liability to escheat, the entire and absolute property is vested in the owners, according to the nature of their respective estates".

=== Legacy of Quia Emptores in United States law ===
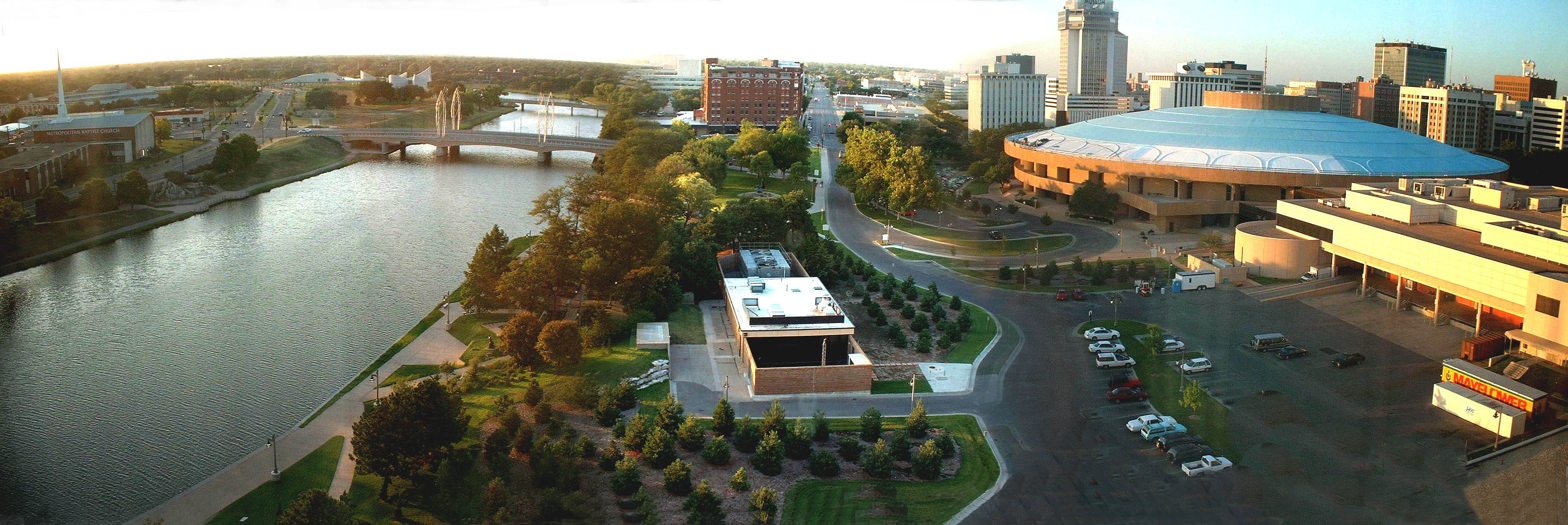
The legacy of Quia Emptores exists in modern United States land law.

Although it is a matter of debate whether Quia Emptores was the effective law within the colonies, the effect of the statute is still present in United States land laws. Without a doubt, the U.S. Constitution, and various state constitutions and legislative acts have made Quia Emptores moribund in fact. But the language of land law still sounds medieval, and takes its concepts from the time of Edward I and before. The following list of words common in U.S. land law are from Norman England (with their modern meaning in the United States):

- Alienation – "a sale"
- Appurtenant – "belonging to"
- Damnum absque injuria – "injury without wrong"
- Demise – "to lease" or "let" premises
- Enfeoff – "to give land to another"
- Estate – "an interest in land"
- Feoffee – "a party to whom a fee is conveyed"
- Feoffment – "physical delivery of possession of land by feoffeor to the feofee"
- Leasehold – "an estate in land held under a lease"
- Livery of seisin – "delivery of possession"
- Mesne – "intervening"; related to the term "mesne conveyance" meaning an intervening conveyance
- Purchase – "voluntary transfer of property"
- Seisin – "possession of a freehold estate"
- Tenant – "one who holds or occupies the land under some kind of right or title"
- Writ of Fieri Facias – "writ of execution on the property of a judgment debtor"

The terms "fee", "fee tail", "fee tail estate", "fee tail tenant", "fee simple" and the like are essentially the same as they were defined in De Donis Conditionalibus in 1285.

There are four kinds of deeds in common usage:

- warranty deed, which contains covenants for title.
- special warranty deed in which the grantor only covenants to warrant and defend the title.
- deed without covenants in which the grantor purports to convey in fee simple.
- quitclaim deed in which the grantor makes no covenants for title but grants all rights, title and interest.

The last two are directly related to Quia Emptores. Other changes came after the Statute of Uses, 1535 and the Statute of Frauds.

== See also ==
- History of English land law
- English land law

== Bibliography ==
- 28 American Jurisprudence 2nd Estates
- 61 American Jurisprudence 2nd Perpetuities and Restraints on Alienation
- Henderson, E. F., Select Historical Documents of the Middle Ages, George Bell and Sons, London, 1910 (pp. 149–150)
- Holdsworth, W. S., A History of English Law, Little, Brown and Co., Boston, 1927
- Holdsworth, W. S., Some Makers of English Law, The Tagore Series, 1937–1938, Cambridge University Press, 1938
- Kirkalfy, A. K. R. Potter's Historical Introduction to English Law and Its Institutions, Sweet and Maxwell Ltd. London, 1962
- Plucknett, Theodore (1956). A Concise History of the Common Law (5th ed.). Boston: Little, Brown and Company.
- Pollock, Frederick; Maitland, Frederic William (1968). The History of the English Law. Vol. 1 (2nd ed.). Cambridge University Press. pp. 332–335, 337, 354–356, 608–610.
- Pollock, Frederick; Maitland, Frederic William (1968a). The History of the English Law. Vol. 2 (2nd ed.). Cambridge University Press. pp. 292–294.
- The Statutes of the Realm (1963 ed.). London, England: Dawsons of Pall Mall. 1805 – via HathiTrust.
- Robertson, A. J., Laws of the Kings of England, Cambridge University Press, 1925
- Roebuck, Derek, Background of the Common Law, Oxford, 1990
- Stoner, James R., Common Law and Liberal Theory, University of Kansas Press, Lawrence, Kansas, 1992
- Stubbs, W. H. (1903). Select Charters and the Illustrations of English Constitutional History. Clarendon Press.
- The Origins of Property in Land Numa Denis Fustel de Coulanges (McMaster University)
- Lyall, Andrew, "Quia Emptores in Ireland" in Liber memorialis: Professor James C. Brady, Round Hall Sweet & Maxwell, 2001, pp. 275–294.
