= Socage =

Type of English feudal land tenure

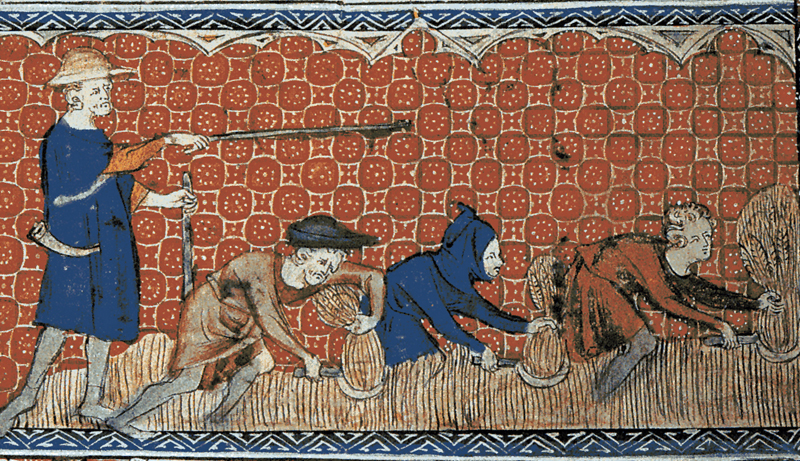
Depiction of socage on the royal demesne (miniature from the Queen Mary Psalter, c. 1310). British Library, London.

Socage (/ˈsɒkɪdʒ/) was one of the feudal duties and land tenure forms in the English feudal system. It eventually evolved into the freehold tenure called "free and common socage", which did not involve feudal duties. Farmers held land in exchange for clearly defined, fixed payments made at specified intervals to feudal lords. In turn, the lord was obligated to provide certain services, such as protection, to the farmer and other duties to the Crown. Payments usually took the form of cash, but occasionally could be made with goods.

Socage contrasted with other forms of tenure, including serjeanty, frankalmoin and knight-service.

The English statute Quia Emptores of Edward I (1290) established that socage tenure which passed from one generation or nominee to the next would be subject to inquisitions post mortem, which would usually involve a feudal relief tax. This contrasts with the treatment of leases, which could be lifelong or readily subject to forfeiture and rent increase.

As feudalism declined, the prevalence of socage tenure increased until it became the normal form of tenure in the Kingdom of England. In 1660, the Statute of Tenures ended the practice of estates requiring owners to provide military or religious service, and most freehold tenures and other were converted into "free and common socage".

The holder of a soc or socage tenure was referred to as a socager (Anglo-Norman) or Socman (Anglo-Saxon, also spelt sochman, from the legal concept of a soke, from the verb 'to seek'). In German-speaking Europe, the broad equivalent was a Dienstmann. The etymology of socage according to William Blackstone is the old Latin word for a plough.

== See also ==
- Soke (legal)
- Quia Emptores
- Statute of Tenures (legal owners)
- Computo
- Corvée
- History of English land law
