= Knight-service =

Land tenure under the feudal system

Knight-service was a form of feudal land tenure under which a knight held a fief or estate of land termed a knight's fee (fee being synonymous with fief) from an overlord conditional on him as a tenant performing military service for his overlord.

== History ==
It is associated in its origin with that development in warfare which made the mailed horseman, armed with lance and sword, the most important factor in battle. It was long believed that knight-service was developed out of the liability, under the English system, of every five hides of land to provide one soldier in war. It is now held that, on the contrary, it was a novel system in England when it was introduced after the Conquest by the Normans, who relied essentially on their mounted knights, while the English fought on foot. It existed in Normandy where a knight held a fief termed a fief de haubert, from the hauberk or coat of mail (Latin: lorica) worn by knights. An allusion is made to this in the coronation charter of Henry I (1100), which speaks of those holding by knight-service as "militibus qui per loricam terras suas deserviunt" (literally "soldiers who serve [or are subject to] their lands by means of armour").

William the Conqueror divided the lay lands of England among his magnates in the form of "honours" or great blocks of land. These were subdivided by the magnates into smaller manors and yet smaller divisions or fiefs just large enough to support one knight, termed knight's fees. The knight paid homage to his overlord by taking a vow of loyalty and accepting the obligation to perform military service for his overlord.

The same system was adopted in Ireland when that country was conquered under Henry II. The magnate who had been enfeoffed by his sovereign for his honour of land could provide the knights required either by hiring them for pay or, more conveniently when wealth was mainly represented by land, by a process of subinfeudation, analogous to that by which he himself had been enfeoffed. That is to say, he could assign to an under-tenant a certain portion of his fief to be held by direct military service or the service of providing a mercenary knight. The land so held would then be described as consisting of one or more knight's fees, but the knight's fee had not any fixed area, as different soils and climates required differing acreages to produce a given profit requisite to support a knight and his entourage. This process could be carried further till there was a chain of mesne lords between the tenant-in-chief and the actual occupier of the land. The liability for performance of the knight-service was, however, always carefully defined.

The chief sources of information for the extent and development of knight-service are the returns (cartae) of the barons (i.e. the tenants-in-chief) in 1166, informing the king, at his request, of the names of their tenants by knight-service with the number of fees they held, supplemented by the payments for scutage recorded on the pipe rolls, by the later returns printed in the Book of Fees, and by the still later ones collected in Feudal Aids.

In the returns made in 1166 some of the barons appear as having enfeoffed more and some less than the number of knights they had to find. In the latter case they described the balance as being chargeable on their demesne, that is, on the portion of their fief which remained in their own hands. These returns further prove that lands had already been granted for the service of a fraction of a knight, such service being in practice already commuted for a proportionate monetary payment; and they show that the total number of knights with which land held by military service was charged was not, as was formerly supposed, sixty thousand, but, probably, somewhere between five and six thousand. Similar returns were made for Normandy, and are valuable for the light they throw on its system of knight-service.

== Incidents of military tenure ==
The primary obligation incumbent on every knight was service in the field, when called upon, for forty days a year, with specified armour and arms. There was, however, a standing dispute as to whether he could be called upon to perform this service outside the realm, nor was the question of his expenses free from difficulty. In addition to this primary duty, he had, in numerous cases at least, to perform that of castle ward at his lord's chief castle for a fixed number of days in the year. On certain baronies also was incumbent the duty of providing knights for the guard of royal castles, such as Windsor, Rockingham and Dover.

Under the feudal system, the tenant by knight-service had also the same pecuniary obligations to his lord as had his lord to the king. These consisted of:

- Aids, which consisted of the duty to ransom the lord if he were taken prisoner, to make the lord's eldest son a knight, and to marry the lord's eldest daughter
- Relief, which he paid on succeeding to his lands;
- Primer seisin
- Wardship, that is, the profits from his lands during a minority (i.e., if the landholder is too young to manage the land);
- Marriage, that is, the right of giving in marriage (unless bought off), his heiress, his heir (if a minor) and his widow.

== Denaturation ==
The principle of commuting for the obligation of military service into payments struck at the root of the whole system. The change of conception was so complete, that tenure by knight-service of a mesne lord becomes, first in fact and then in law, a tenure by escuage (i.e. scutage). By the time of Henry III, as Bracton states, the test of tenure was scutage; liability, however small, to scutage payment made the tenure military.

The disintegration of the system was carried further in the latter half of the 13th century as a consequence of changes in warfare, which were increasing the importance of foot soldiers and making the service of a knight for forty days of less value to the king. The barons, instead of paying scutage, compounded for their service by the payment of lump sums, and, by a process which is still obscure, the nominal quotas of knight-service due from each had, by the time of Edward I, been largely reduced. The knight's fee, however, remained a knight's fee, and the pecuniary incidents of military tenure, especially wardship, marriage, and fines on alienation, long continued to be a source of revenue to the crown. But at the Restoration (1660) tenure by knight-service was abolished by the Tenures Abolition Act 1660, and with it these vexatious exactions were abolished.

== Sources and bibliography ==
The returns of 1166 are preserved in the Liber Niger (13th century), edited by Hearne, and the Liber Rubeus or Red Book of the Exchequer (13th century), edited by H. Hall for the Rolls Series in 1896. The later returns are in the Book of Fees and in the Record Office volumes of Feudal Aids, arranged under counties.

For the financial side of knight-service the early pipe rolls have been printed by the Record Commission and the Pipe Roll Society, and abstracts of later ones will be found in The Red Book of the Exchequer, which may be studied on the whole question, but the editors' view must be received with caution and checked by JH Round's Studies on the Red Book of the Exchequer (for private circulation). The Baronia Anglica of Madox may also be consulted.

The existing theory on knight-service was enunciated by Mr Round in English Historical Review, vi., vii, and reissued by him in his Feudal England (1895). It is accepted by Pollock and Maitland (History of English Law), who discuss the question at length; by Mr JF Baldwin in his Scutage and Knight-service in England (University of Chicago Press, 1897), a valuable monograph with bibliography; and by Petit-Dutaillis, in his Studies supplementary to Stubbs' Constitutional History (Manchester University Series, 1908).

== See also ==
- History of English land law
