= Mesne lord =

Type of lord in the feudal system

A mesne lord (/miːn/) was a lord in the feudal system who had vassals who held land from him, but who was himself the vassal of a higher lord. Owing to Quia Emptores, the concept of a mesne lordship technically still exists today: the partitioning of the lord of the manor's estate among co-heirs creating the mesne lordships.

In an English court of law in 1863 it was claimed that "the lord of the mesne manor pays a rent to a superior lord and that rent empowers him to receive chief rents from certain farms".

A mesne lord did not hold land directly of the king, that is to say he was not a tenant-in-chief. His subinfeudated estate was called a "mesne estate" or Afterlehen in the Holy Roman Empire. Traditionally, he is a lord of the manor who holds land from a superior lord and who usually lets some of the land to a tenant. He was thus an intermediate or "middle" tenant, which status is reflected in the Old French word mesne, in the modern French language moyen.

The mesne lordship of Potter Newton was probably held in 1166 by Herbert de Arches. Mesne lords continued to exist after the abolition of any further subinfeudation by the statute of Quia Emptores (1290). However, with time and the loss of records (except in the case of former copyhold land), it came to be assumed that most land was held directly of the Crown.

The title of a mesne lord remained a legal entity throughout the 19th century; in 1815, Encyclopaedia Londinensis records that a "Lord mesne is the owner of a manor and by virtue thereof hath tenants holding of him in fee, and by copy of court roll; and yet holds himself of a superior lord called Lord Paramount". However, escheat in want of heirs to mesne lords was abolished by the Administration of Estates Act 1925.

== See also ==
- Afterlehen
- Land tenure
- Quia Emptores
- Moiety title
- Lord of the manor
