= Feudal land tenure in England =

Aspect of Medieval English law

Under the English feudal system several different forms of land tenure existed, each effectively a contract with differing rights and duties attached thereto. Such tenures could be either free-hold if they were hereditable or perpetual or non-free if they terminated on the tenant's death or at an earlier specified period.

== High medieval period ==
In England's ancient past large parts of the realm were unoccupied and owned as allodial titles: the landowners simply cooperated with the king out of a mutual interest instead of legal obligation. It was not until the Norman Conquest, when William the Conqueror declared himself to be the sole allodial owner of the entire realm, that land tenures changed drastically. In William's kingdom the common exchange and sale of land became restricted and all landholders were made to provide a service to their lord ("no land without a lord").

=== Norman reforms ===
William stripped the land from those who opposed him and redistributed it among his followers. He introduced a new type of feudalism, in which obligation extended right down through the hierarchy, a model informed by the military system.

=== Barony and knight-service ===
The tenants-in-chief held their land by the tenure of barony, which required the tenant to provide a number of knights for their liege for 40 days per annum. After the served days, the liege was obliged either to begin paying the knights, or to dismiss them. However, tenants who held their land by the tenure of knight-service were not permitted to pass their lands to the heir automatically, but were required to obtain the lord's approval.

The system failed because the assessment of knight's fees became impossible to maintain. Few estates retained the same wealth and population as when first enfeoffed, with the result that the lords could not provide the number of knights they were obligated to provide. Another issue was the practice of subinfeudation, by which the subtenants were able to alienate the land to tenants of their own. This became unpopular among the superior lords, and was banned by Edward I in his edict Quia Emptores. In compensation, the sale of properties was made legal.

== Late medieval period ==
During the course of the late medieval period, knight-service came to be replaced by the tenure of scutage, under which tenants paid tax assessed according to their knight's fee, instead of providing knights. Before the mid-13th century the fiefdoms had not been heritable owing to the uncertainty of whether the heir of the tenant would be capable of providing the required knight-service. As scutage replaced knight-service, that question fell outside consideration. Heirs were therefore able to succeed fiefs in exchange for the payment of a type of inheritance tax.

The Tenures Abolition Act 1660 declared that all land was to be held by socage tenure, ending the feudal tenure.
