= Subinfeudation =

Feudal practice

In English law, subinfeudation is the practice by which tenants, holding land under the king or other superior lord, carved out new and distinct tenures in their turn by sub-letting or alienating a part of their lands.

The tenants were termed mesne lords, with regard to those holding from them, the immediate tenant being tenant in capite. The lowest tenant of all was the freeholder, or, as he was sometimes termed, tenant paravail. The Crown, who in theory owned all lands, was lord paramount.

The great lords looked with dissatisfaction on the increase of such subtenures. Accordingly, in 1290 a statute was passed, Quia Emptores, which allowed the tenant to alienate whenever he pleased, but the person to whom he granted the land was to hold it for the same immediate lord, and by the same services as the alienor held it before.

== Scotland ==
In Scots law, the feudal system was abolished by the Abolition of Feudal Tenure etc. (Scotland) Act 2000. The length of a lease was limited to 175 years to prevent the existence of perpetual landlord–tenant relationships similar to those that existed under feudal tenure.

== Holy Roman Empire ==
Within the Holy Roman Empire, mesne fiefs were known as Afterlehen, which became inheritable over time and could have up to five "stations" between the actual holder of the fief and the overarching liege lord.

== See also ==
- Afterlehen
- Cestui que
- Charter of Liberties
- Concordat of Worms
- Lease § Sublease
- Statutes of Mortmain
- Quia Emptores
