= William Latymer =

English evangelical clergyman and scholar

The Very Reverend Doctor William Latymer M.A, D.D
- Born: 1499; Freston, Suffolk
- Died: August 28, 1583 (aged 83–84); Peterborough, Cambridgeshire
- Burial place: Peterborough Cathedral
- Occupation: Dean of Peterborough
- Notable work: Chronickille of Anne Bulleyne
- Spouse: Ellen
- Children: Edward Latymer, Josua Latymer
- Parents: William Latymer II (father); Anne Bokinge (mother)

William Latymer (1498/1499 – 28 August 1583) was an English evangelical clergyman, scholar, and ecclesiastical administrator, best known for his roles as Dean of Peterborough (1560–1583) and Prebendary of Westminster (1560–1583). A chaplain to Anne Boleyn, he authored the Chronickille of Anne Bulleyne and contributed to the early development of the Chapter Library at Westminster Abbey. Latymer played a significant role in the English Reformation, notably as a witness in the trial of Edmund Bonner in 1549.

== Early life ==
William Latymer III was likely born in 1498 or 1499 in Freston, though no record of his birth exists. He was the third son of William Latymer II of Freston, Suffolk, and his wife Anne, daughter of Edward Bokinge of Ashbocking, Suffolk. Latymer studied at Corpus Christi College, Cambridge, where he initially read canon law for two years before transitioning to arts, completing a seven-year course of study. He graduated with a Master of Arts (M.A.) by special grace in 1536 and later received a Doctor of Divinity (D.D.) in 1564. During his time at Cambridge, Latymer developed a strong connection with Corpus Christi, which influenced his later ecclesiastical career.

== Ecclesiastical career ==
William Latymer’s ecclesiastical career spanned several decades, marked by numerous appointments and significant involvement in the religious upheavals of 16th-century England. His roles reflected his evangelical sympathies and his ability to navigate the shifting political and religious landscape under multiple monarchs.

=== Early Appointments ===
Latymer’s career began in 1537 when he was granted a license to hold incompatible benefices of any value while remaining non-resident. On 1 October 1538, he was appointed Rector of Witnesham in Suffolk, a position presented by his eldest brother, Edward Latymer, which he held until 1554. That same year, on 22 October 1538, at the age of 40, he was appointed by the king as Master of the College of St Lawrence Pountney in London, a position he held alongside the living of Speldhurst in Kent. The college, a chantry founded in 1345 by Sir John Pountney, was closely tied to Corpus Christi, Cambridge. Latymer remained Master until the college’s dissolution in 1547 by Edward VI and then sold John Cheke, after which he received an annual pension of 28 pounds, 13 shillings and 4 pence. The college and its associated church were later destroyed in the Great Fire of 1666, and their site is now marked by a memorial tablet in Lawrence Pountney Lane. During his tenure, Latymer sat in convocation as a proctor for the clergy of the Diocese of Norwich and voted in favor of priests’ marriages, a stance that brought him into prominence.

=== Trial of Edmund Bonner ===
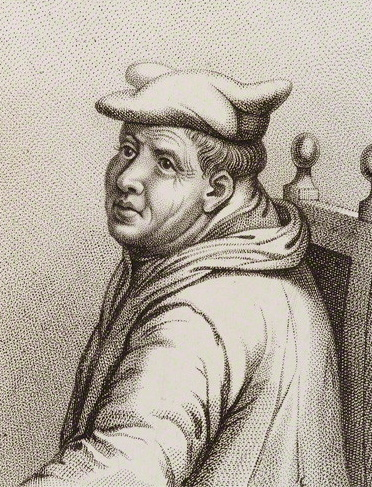
Edmund Bonner

Latymer was among a group of evangelicals, including Thomas Cranmer and Matthew Parker, who gathered around Anne Boleyn as Queen and patron of the reformers. His evangelical stance became evident in 1549 when he became involved in the trial of Edmund Bonner, Bishop of London. Following Bonner’s Paul’s Cross sermon on 1 September 1549, which failed to satisfy the authorities, Latymer, alongside John Hooper and William Pountney, served as a witness against him. Bonner was sentenced to deprivation and committed to Marshalsea Prison on 1 October 1549. Latymer made no objection to the dissolution of St Lawrence Pountney and, with others, received a pension under Queen Mary. His involvement in Bonner’s trial is documented in historical accounts such as John Foxe’s Actes and Monuments and John Gairdner’s History of the English Church in the Sixteenth Century, however, In several editions the name Hugh Latimer has been mistakenly substituted for this William.

=== Later Appointments ===
On 22 July 1553, Latymer was appointed Rector of St Mary Abchurch, a parish adjacent to St Lawrence Pountney, with his relative Thomas Alured as patron. The following year, he became Rector of Kirton at Shotley, near Ipswich, though he never resided there. The accession of Queen Mary in 1553 temporarily halted his career due to the revocation of the Act of 1549, which had allowed married priests to hold office. Having renounced his wife, Latymer retired to his hometown of Freston, was appointed Rector of St Stephen and St Lawrence in 1556 and remained there for a few years. After Queen Mary’s death in November 1558, his career resumed under Queen Elizabeth. On 17 April 1559, he was admitted to the Rectory of St George’s, Southwark. In 1560, he was appointed Prebendary of Westminster and Dean of Peterborough, positions he held until his death in 1583. As Prebendary, he was required to reside at Westminster for at least four months and four days each year, overseeing ecclesiastical and pastoral duties, as well as managing the annual accounts and financial affairs of Westminster Abbey. He also served as Treasurer of Westminster Abbey from 1561 to 1570 and was occasionally referred to as Archdeacon of Westminster. During Queen Elizabeth’s 1564 visit to Cambridge, Latymer held the position of Clerk of the Closet.

== Chronickille of Anne Bulleyne ==
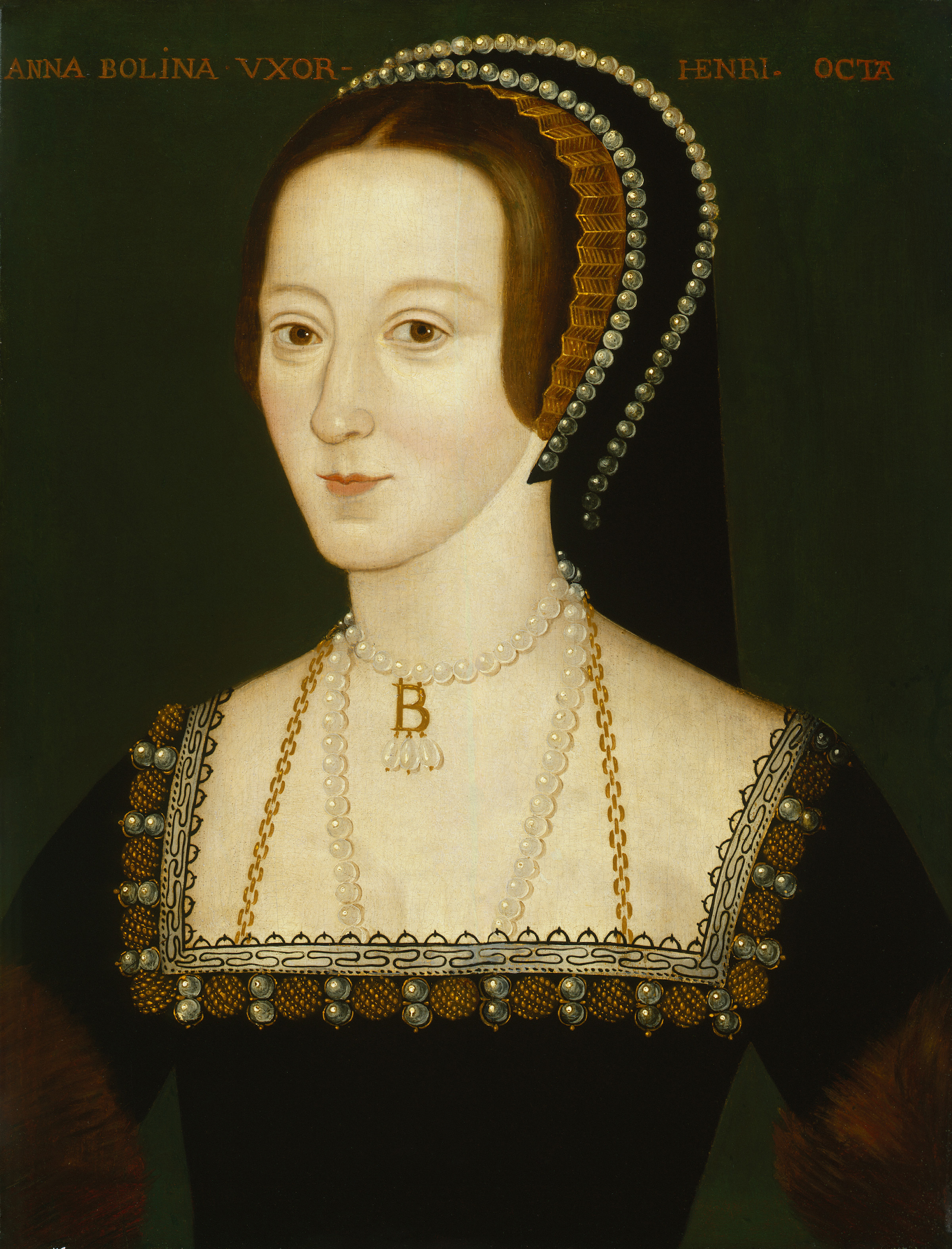
Anne Boleyn, whom William was a chaplain of

William Latymer authored the Chronickille of Anne Bulleyne, a biography of Anne Boleyn, written for Queen Elizabeth I, focusing on her mother’s religious life and patronage of the Protestant cause. Latymer, who served as a chaplain to Anne Boleyn around 1533, drew on his personal experiences to craft the work, which reflects his evangelical sympathies. In 1535, he was arrested at Sandwich for bringing forbidden Protestant books into England, an incident that underscored his commitment to the reformed faith; Anne allowed him to send the books to her silkwoman, Joan Wilkinson, preserving his reputation despite her own arrest and execution in 1536. The Chronickille, completed in 1560, portrays Anne as a devout supporter of reformers, aligning with the religious climate under Elizabeth I. Latymer presented the biography during a period of prominence in Elizabeth’s court, notably during her 1564 visit to Cambridge, where he served as Clerk of the Closet and received a Doctor of Divinity. The Chronickille of Anne Bulleyne remains a valuable historical source for understanding Anne Boleyn’s religious influence and Latymer’s role in the early English Reformation.

== Personal life ==
William Latymer married Ellen, whose maiden name is unknown, and together they had two sons, Edward and Josua. Ellen, a local widow at the time of their marriage, brought a son from her previous marriage, Edmund English, who became William’s stepson. Ellen outlived William, dying in 1603. Edward Latymer, the elder son, later served as a clerk and attorney at the Court of Wards and Liveries and went on to found The Latymer School and Latymer Upper School in London, establishing a lasting educational legacy. Josua, the younger son, may have moved to London, though little is known of his later life. In 1570, Josua was involved in a legal dispute when he was sued by a London merchant, John Johnson, for a debt of £40, which Johnson claimed Josua had guaranteed on behalf of a third party. The outcome of the case is unclear. Edmund English, a Cambridge graduate and a benefactor of Emmanuel College, Cambridge, became an official at the Exchequer in Westminster.

== Death and Burial ==
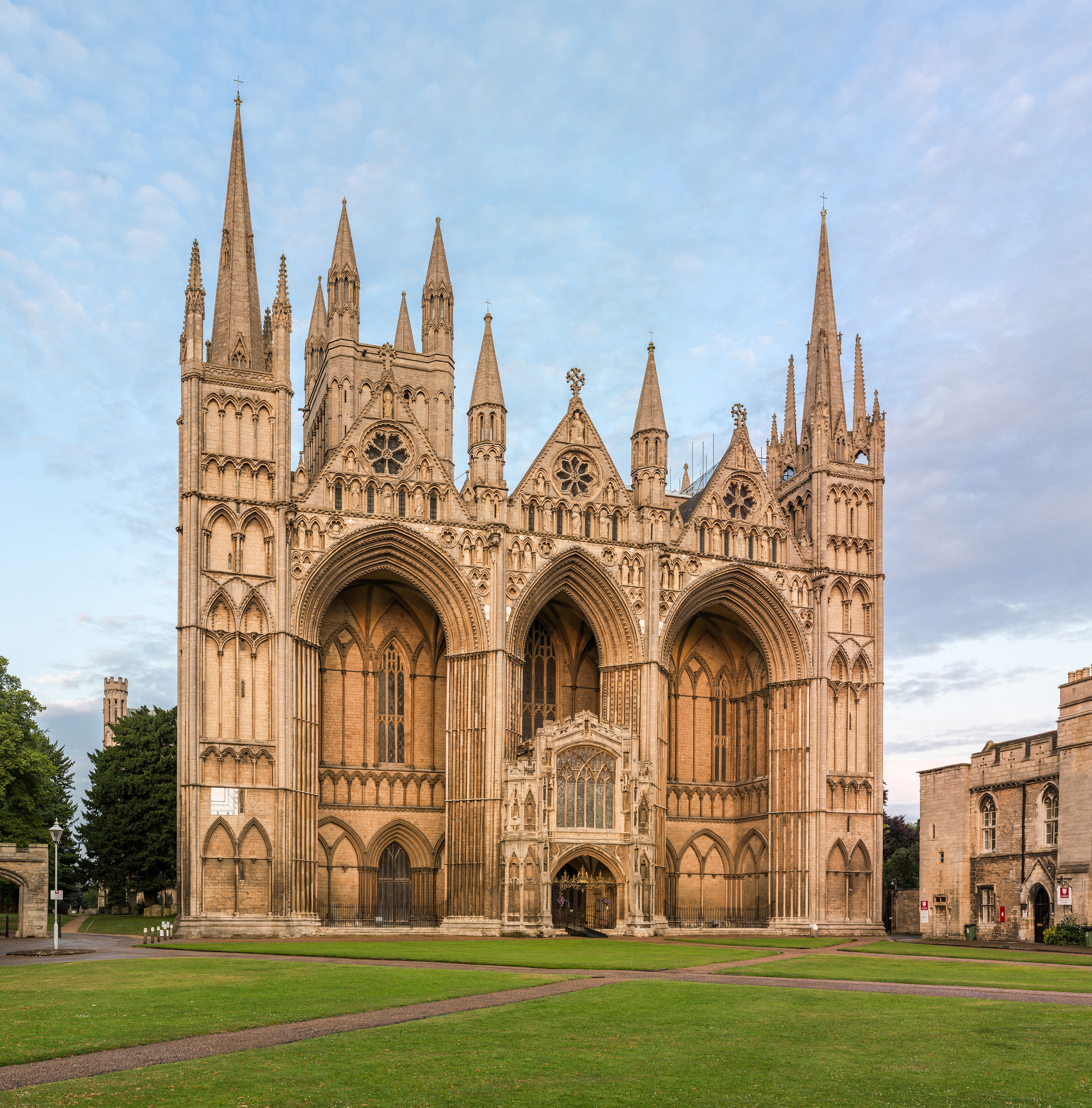
Peterborough Cathedral, where William was buried in 1583

William Latymer died on 28 August 1583. He was buried on the same day beneath the pulpit in the choir of Peterborough Cathedral, as recorded in the parish register of St. John Baptist, Peterborough. In his last will and testament, dated 29 July 1583, Latymer left substantial bequests to his family and others. To his wife, Ellen, he bequeathed thirty pounds, various household goods, and personal items, including silverware and furniture. His son Josua Latymer received fifty pounds, three loads of hay, and silver items, along with goods remaining at Westminster (excluding books, which were donated to the library there). His son Edward Latymer, named an executor of the will, was left fifty pounds, a large collection of household furnishings, books at Peterborough, and additional silverware, including a partially gilded silver goblet. Latymer also allocated funds for his funeral, alms for the poor, and specific gifts to friends, church officials, and servants.

His tomb is not mentioned in the list of monuments given by Willis Browne in 1718 and the exact site of the grave cannot now be determined. The church was repaved by Dean Tarrant (1764-1791), but unfortunately the ancient inscribed stones were not preserved. In 1892 the floor of the choir was repaved with tessellated Roman mosaic, when the position of the graves below was entirely obliterated.
