= Hammersmith Broadway =

Coordinates: 51°29′31″N 0°13′26″W

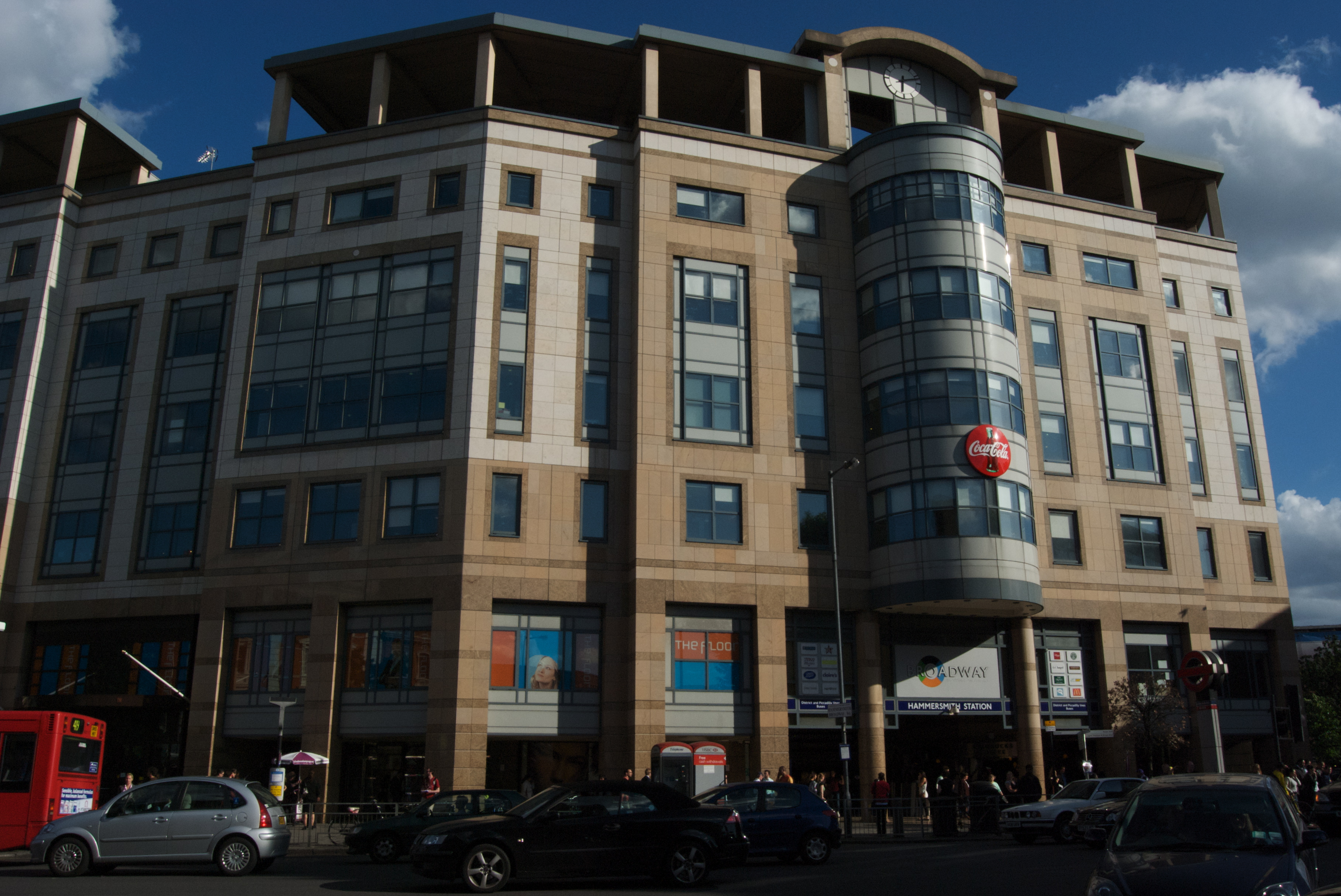
- Location: Hammersmith, London, England
- Opened: 1994
- Num. of stores: 47
- Public transit: Hammersmith (District and Piccadilly lines); Hammersmith (Circle and Hammersmith & City lines)
- Website: hammersmithbroadway.co.uk

Hammersmith Broadway is a major transport node and shopping centre in Hammersmith, London.

== History ==
The shopping centre opened in 1994, on the site of many now-demolished buildings, including the hotel Clarendon (also a music venue) and Palmers Department Store. The complex was designed by EPR Architects.

== Tenants ==
Current tenants include Auntie Anne's, Betfred, Boots, Cards Galore, Costa Coffee, Greggs, Hangry Pizza, Hays plc, Hotel Chocolat, Krispy Kreme, Leon, McDonald's, Pret a Manger, Pure, Scribbler, Starbucks, Supercuts, Superdrug, Tesco, Timpson and Wasabi.

== Transport ==
The complex includes a large, modern bus station, spread across two levels. The upper bus station is located directly above the shopping centre, whereas the lower bus station is located at ground level adjacent to the centre.

It is also served by two London Underground stations named Hammersmith: The District and Piccadilly lines station is located directly below the shopping centre, with entrances at either end of the centre, while the Circle and Hammersmith & City lines station is located a short distance north of the centre at Beadon Road.

== Gallery ==
Shops advertised on the main entrance to Hammersmith Broadway

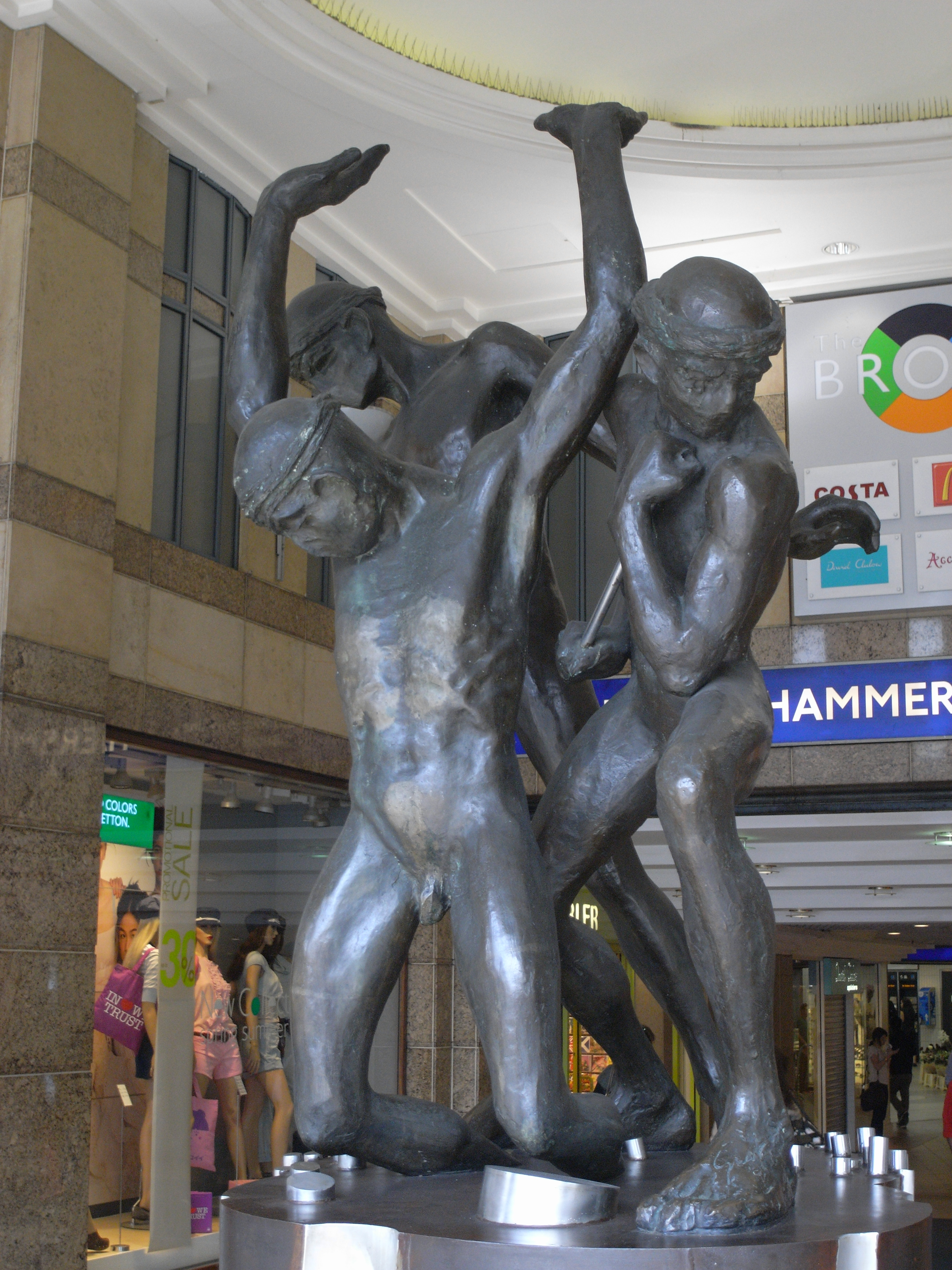
Statue in entrance to Hammersmith Broadway

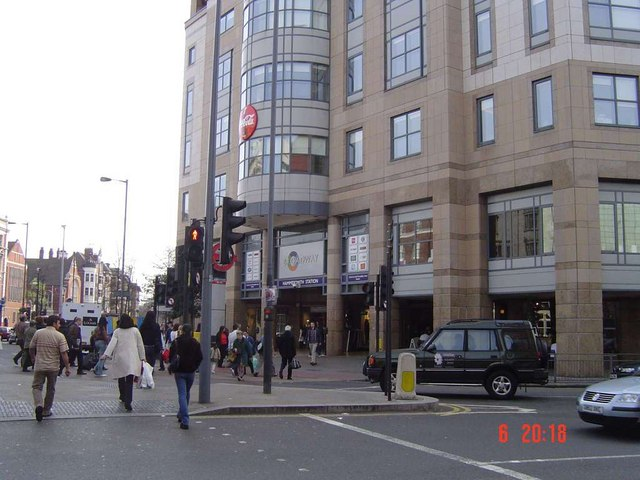
Entrance to Hammersmith Broadway
