= Scribbler =

Scribbler may refer to:

- Scribbler (card shop), a British chain of greetings card shops
- Scribbler (robot)
- Scribbler (racehorse) a competitor who failed to complete the 1997 Grand National steeplechase
- A notebook, which is commonly referred to as a scribbler in the Atlantic Provinces
- An employee in a scribbling mill where the wool was roughly carded before spinning, an old English occupation
- The Scribbler, see List of defunct newspapers of Quebec
- The Scribbler (album)
- The Scribbler (film), 2014 American thriller film directed by John Suits
- The Scribbler (graphic novel), by Daniel Schaffer
- An amateur journalist or hack writer
- Scribbler or Cladara atroliturata, moth found in North America
- Robert T. Teamoh (1864–1912), pen name Scribbler, American journalist, newspaper editor, and politician

== See also ==
- Scribble (disambiguation)
