= Latymer Upper School =

Private school in Hammersmith, London

- Coat of arms

Location
- King Street; Hammersmith, London, W6 9LR; United Kingdom; 51.492°N 0.237°W

Information
- Type: Public school Private school Day school
- Motto: Latin: Paulatim ergo certe (Slowly Therefore Surely)
- Religious affiliation: Church of England
- Established: School: 1895; 131 years ago Latymer Foundation: 1624; 402 years ago
- Founder: Edward Latymer
- Sister school: Godolphin and Latymer School
- Local authority: Hammersmith and Fulham
- Department for Education URN: 100370 Tables
- Head: Susan Wijeratna
- Staff: 180 full time, 37 music staff
- Gender: Co-educational since 2004 (Formerly all-boys)
- Age: 7 to 18
- Enrolment: 1,284
- Colours: Black, blue and white
- Publication: The Latymerian
- Alumni: Old Latymerians
- Boat Club: Latymer Upper School Boat Club
- Website: www.latymer-upper.org

Latymer Upper School is a private school in Hammersmith, London, England, on King Street. It derives from a charity school, and is part of the same 1624 bequest by the English legal official Edward Latymer that founded The Latymer School. There is a preparatory school on site, but most students are admitted to the Upper School through examination and interview at the age of eleven. The school's academic results place it among the top schools nationally.

Having opened on its King Street site in 1895, the school spent a period of time in the mid-20th century as a direct grant grammar school, before becoming private with the system's abolition in the 1970s. Remaining single-sex until 1996, when Sixth Form admissions were opened to girls, the school transitioned to full mixed-sex education in the first decade of the 21st century.

Latymer's alumni include members of both Houses of Parliament, winners of Olympic medals, actors, musicians, and many figures in the arts and sciences.

== History ==
=== Foundation ===
Latymer Upper School has its origins in the will of Edward Latymer, who left a bequest to educate "eight poore boyes" of Hammersmith. This was intended "to keep them from idle and vagrant courses, and also to instruct them in some part of God's true religion". He owned Butterwick Manor and the land round about in Hammersmith. Most of Butterwick Manor House was demolished in 1836, except for one wing of the building, Bradmore House. This had been converted into a separate house in 1736; it survives in rebuilt form (Note: Its front facade only; the house was demolished, and the facade rebuilt above a plinth, in 1913.) on Queen Caroline Street, Hammersmith.

In 1627 Latymer split his Butterwick Manor estate three ways, allocating 6 acres (Note: 6 acres is 2.4 hectares; 8½ acres is 3.4 hectares; and 28½ acres is 11.5 hectares.) of land to provide charity for the poor of St Dunstan-in-the-West in the City of London; 8½ acres for what became The Latymer School in Edmonton; and 28½ acres for the Latymer Foundation at Hammersmith.

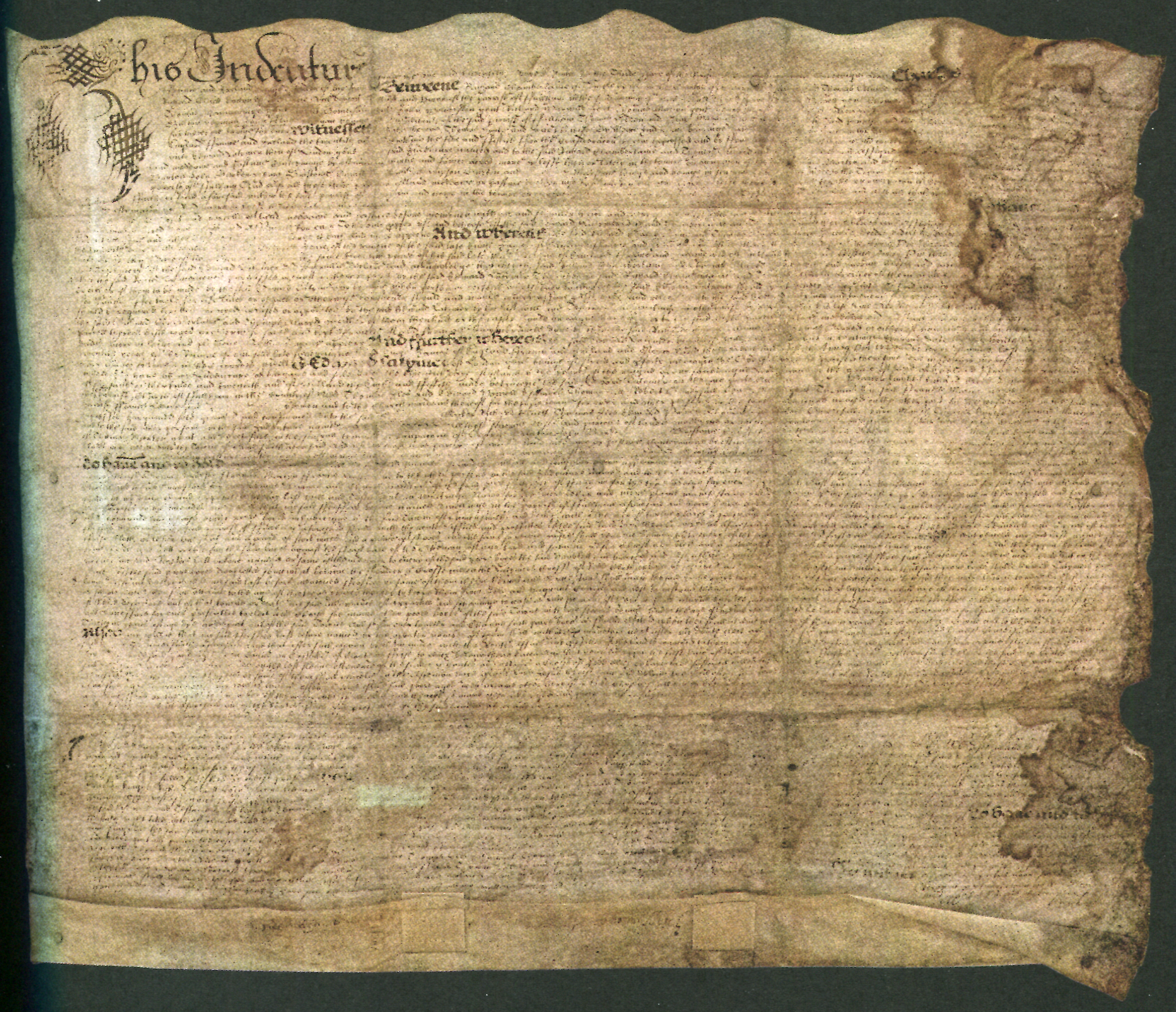
Edward Latymer's deed of conveyance 1627, transferring land of Butterwick Manor to the Latymer Foundation

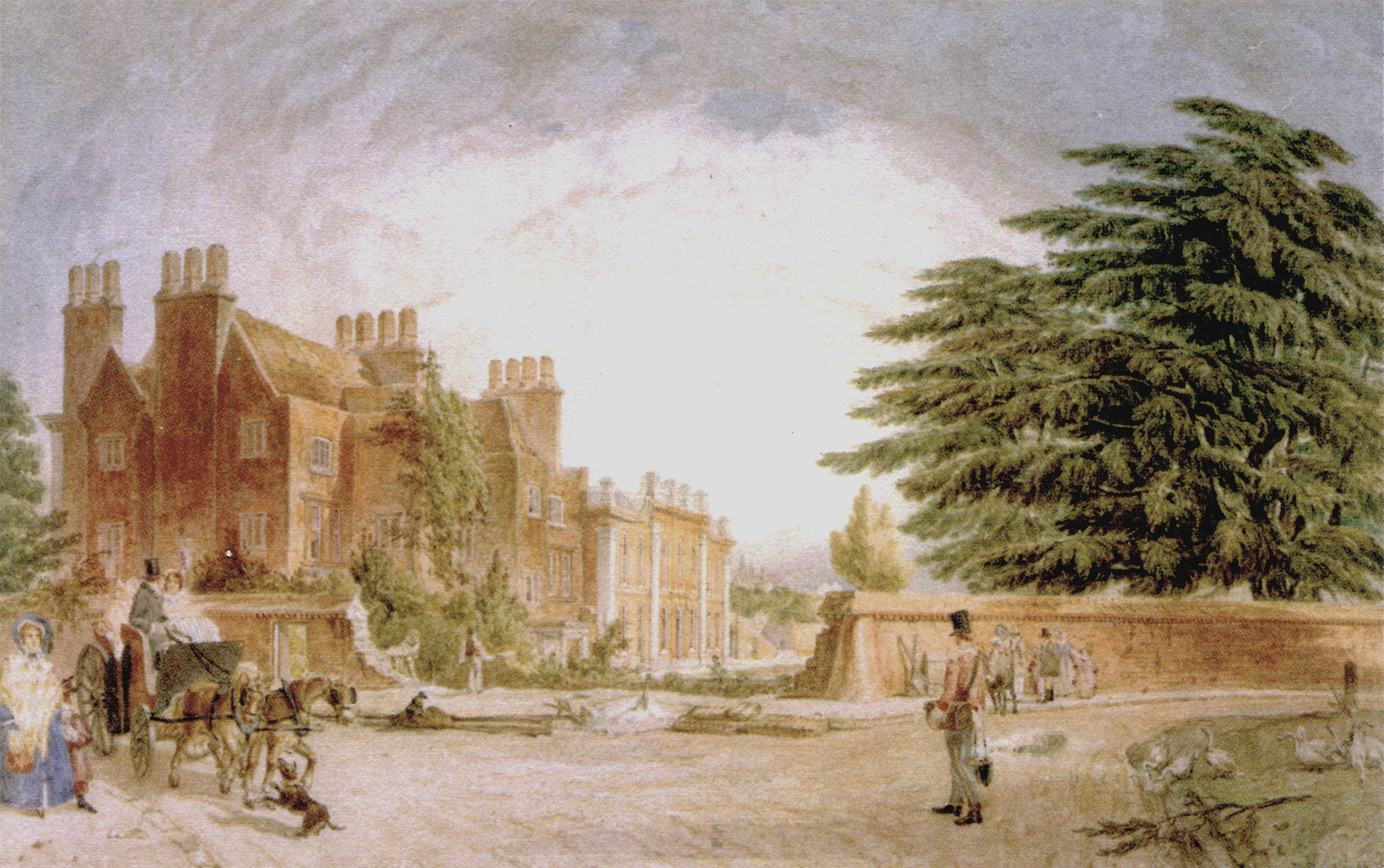
View of Butterwick House and its south wing, Bradmore House. Watercolour by Robert Blemmell Schnebbelie, 1839.

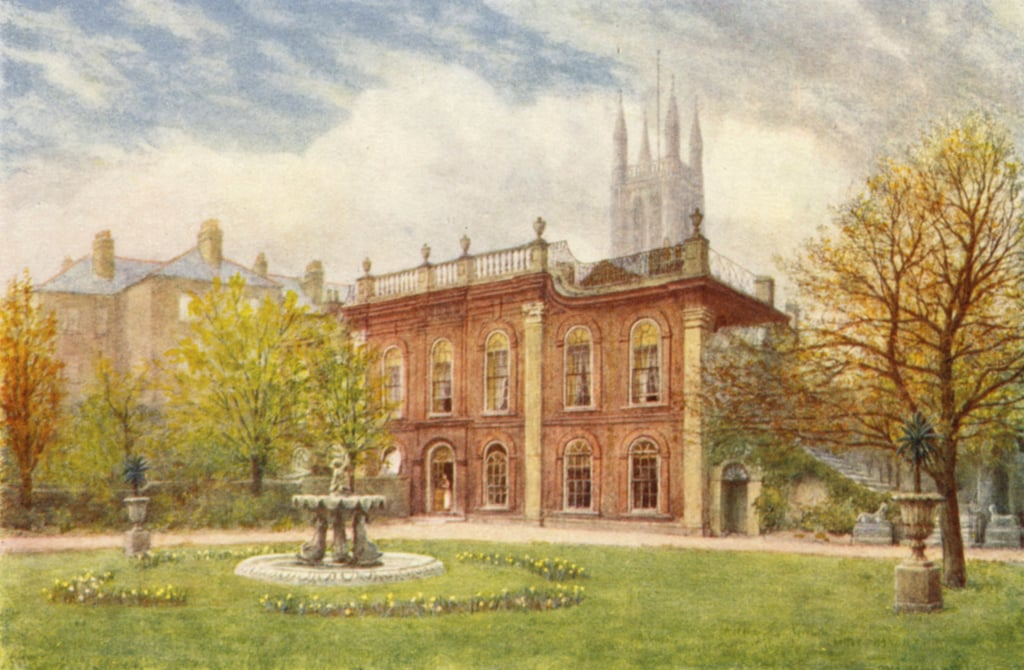
Bradmore House, Queen Caroline Street, Hammersmith: all that survives of Butterwick Manor. 1904 lithograph by Philip Norman.

=== From Fulham to Hammersmith ===
In 1628, a school, partially funded by the estate of Dr. Thomas Edwards, who had died in around 1618, was built for the Latymer boys in the churchyard in Fulham. In 1648, the school moved to a new building, paid for by a Mr. Bull and a Mr. Palmer, in Hammersmith. This served until around 1657, when a charity school for the parish was founded in the churchyard of St Paul's, Hammersmith. At around the same time, and certainly before 1689, a girls' school was created, perhaps in the same building.

The charity school was replaced in 1755 with a new building. It accommodated 25 girls and 20 boys. The school was expanded in 1819 to 50 girls and 80 boys. The girls' school was later closed, and the boys' school increased to 100 pupils. In 1863, the boys' school moved to a new building between King Street East (now Hammersmith Road) and Great Church Lane, a little to the east of Hammersmith Broadway.

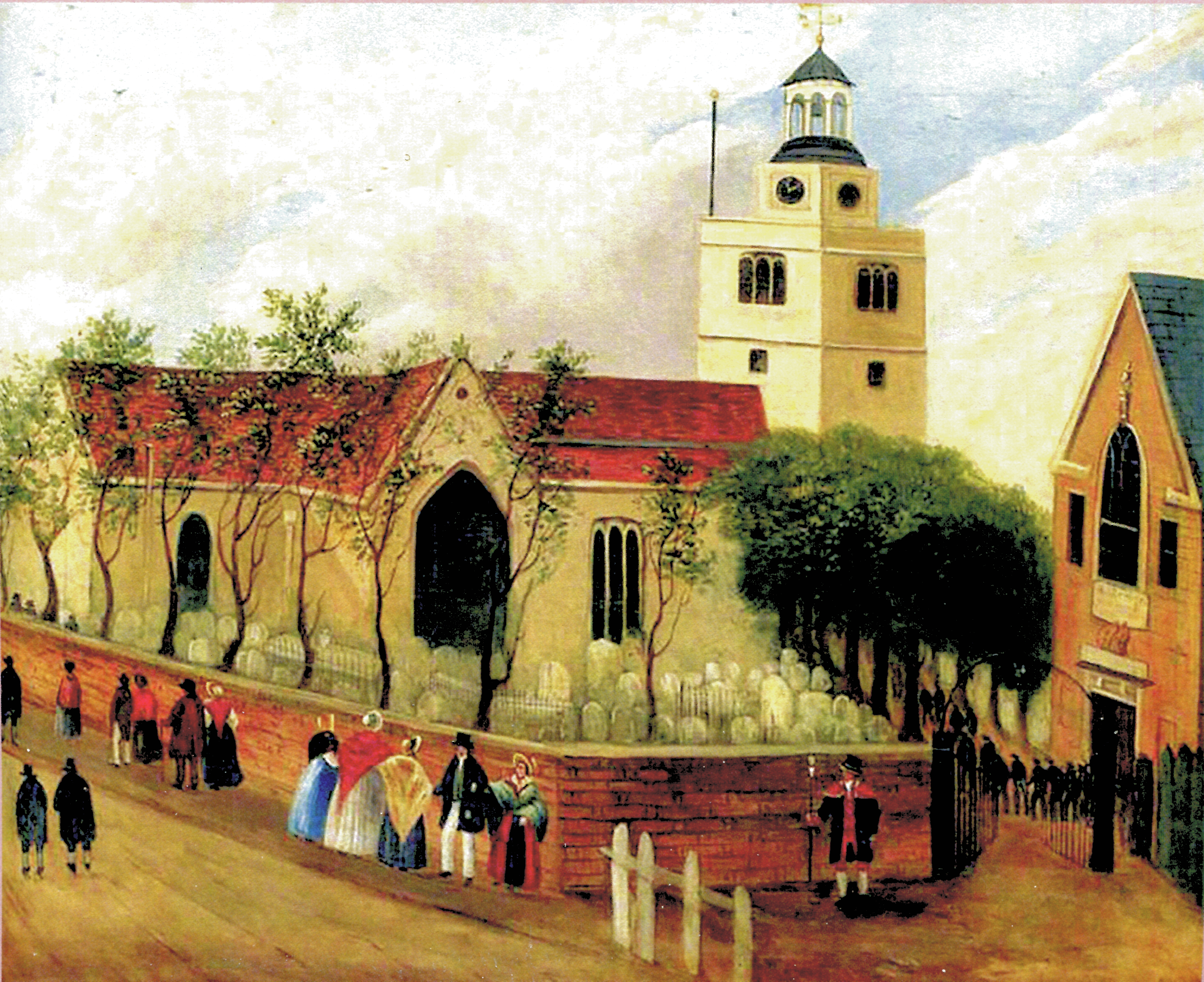
Painting of Latymer Charity School (right) in churchyard of St Paul's, Hammersmith, between 1756 and 1862

The Latymer Charity School was in the centre of Hammersmith, beside St Paul's church. The later Latymer Foundation School was to the east; the current school is to the west.

=== Latymer Upper School, King Street ===
In 1878 it was agreed to build a new school in Hammersmith, with three of the governors to be appointed by the local borough council, and two by the London School Board. The bishop of London, Frederick Temple, opened Latymer Upper School on its new site on King Street in 1895. The old buildings were used for Latymer Lower School, an "elementary" or primary school The school taught boys aged up to 16; the fees were £5, (Note: £5 in 1895 would provide a purchasing power of £824 in 2024.) and boys from local schools could apply for scholarships. The range of subjects taught included practical mechanics and experimental chemistry. The school quickly grew to 300 pupils by 1880. The school was extended in 1901, allowing the total number of pupils to rise to 450.

Latymer was further enlarged in 1930 by extending the main building to the south. The buildings at the Weltje Road and King Street corner were purchased and adapted, with the addition of a biology laboratory and the arrangement of a top floor room as a chapel; this was consecrated in 1938. The school grew substantially in 1951 to over 1000 boys with the acquisition of Rivercourt House, beside the River Thames, extending the Latymer site southwards. In 1957, the Industrial Fund for the Advancement of Science in Schools provided a grant which enabled the school to add new physics laboratories, completed in 1961; the school had grown to 1,150 by 1964.

In 1945, Latymer became a direct grant grammar school, meaning that it took both state-funded and fee-paying pupils. Its head joined the Headmasters' Conference. The Direct Grant system was abolished in 1976, removing government funding, Latymer became a public school, meaning that students normally paid fees. and the school switched to the Assisted Places Scheme, retaining a mix of partly or wholly funded places and fee-paying pupils.

Latymer Prep School is a junior school for pupils from age 7 upwards on the same site, in Rivercourt House, by the River Thames. It was founded in 1951 to prepare pupils for Latymer Upper School.

In 1996, the Sixth Form became co-educational. In 2004, the main school started on the same path, with the introduction of girls into Year 7; as those pupils moved up the school, it became fully co-educational by 2008. In 2018, the school won three Times Educational Supplement awards, for "Independent School of the Year", "Independent-State School Partnerships", and "Senior School of the Year".

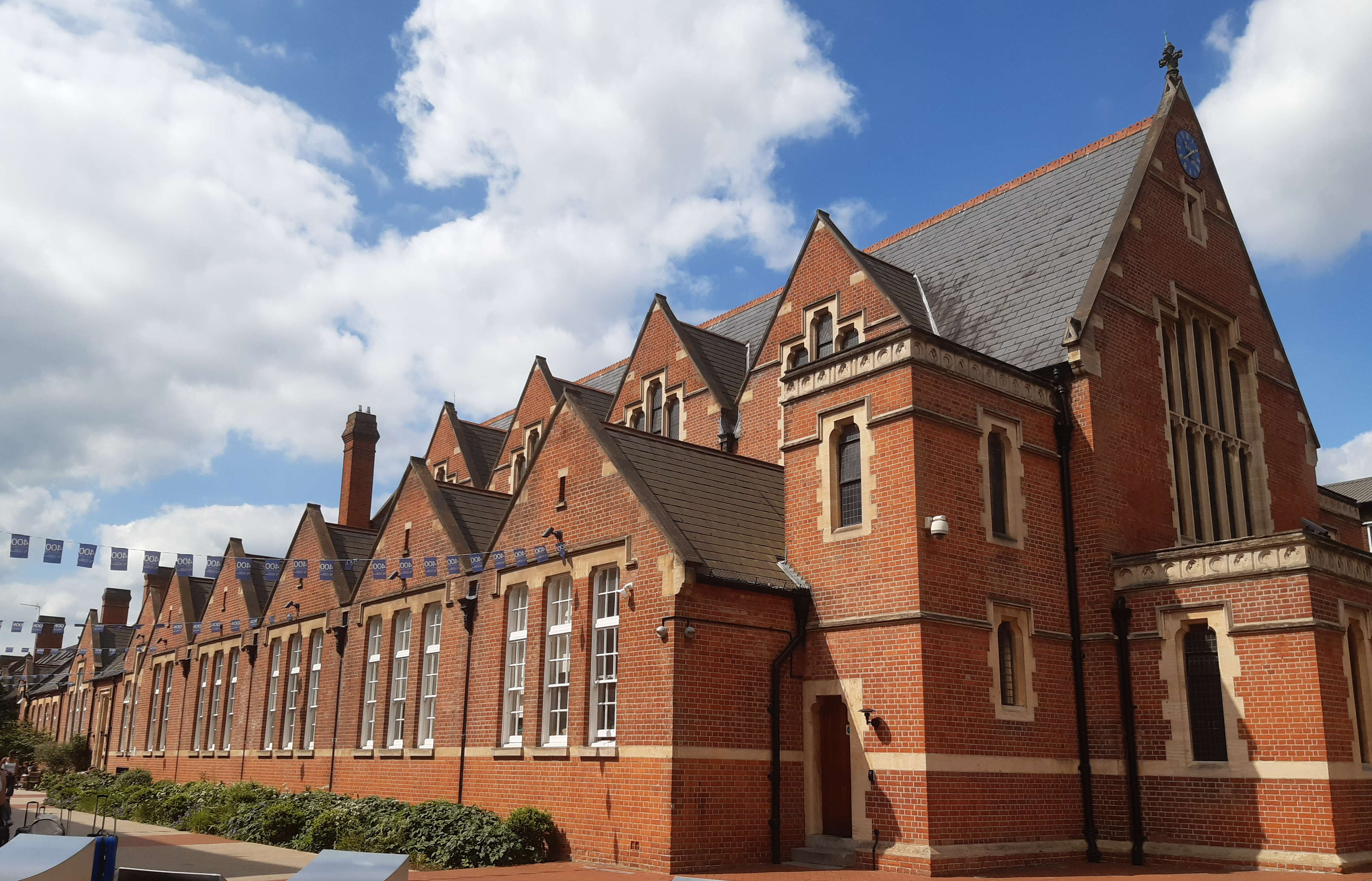
The 1895 building

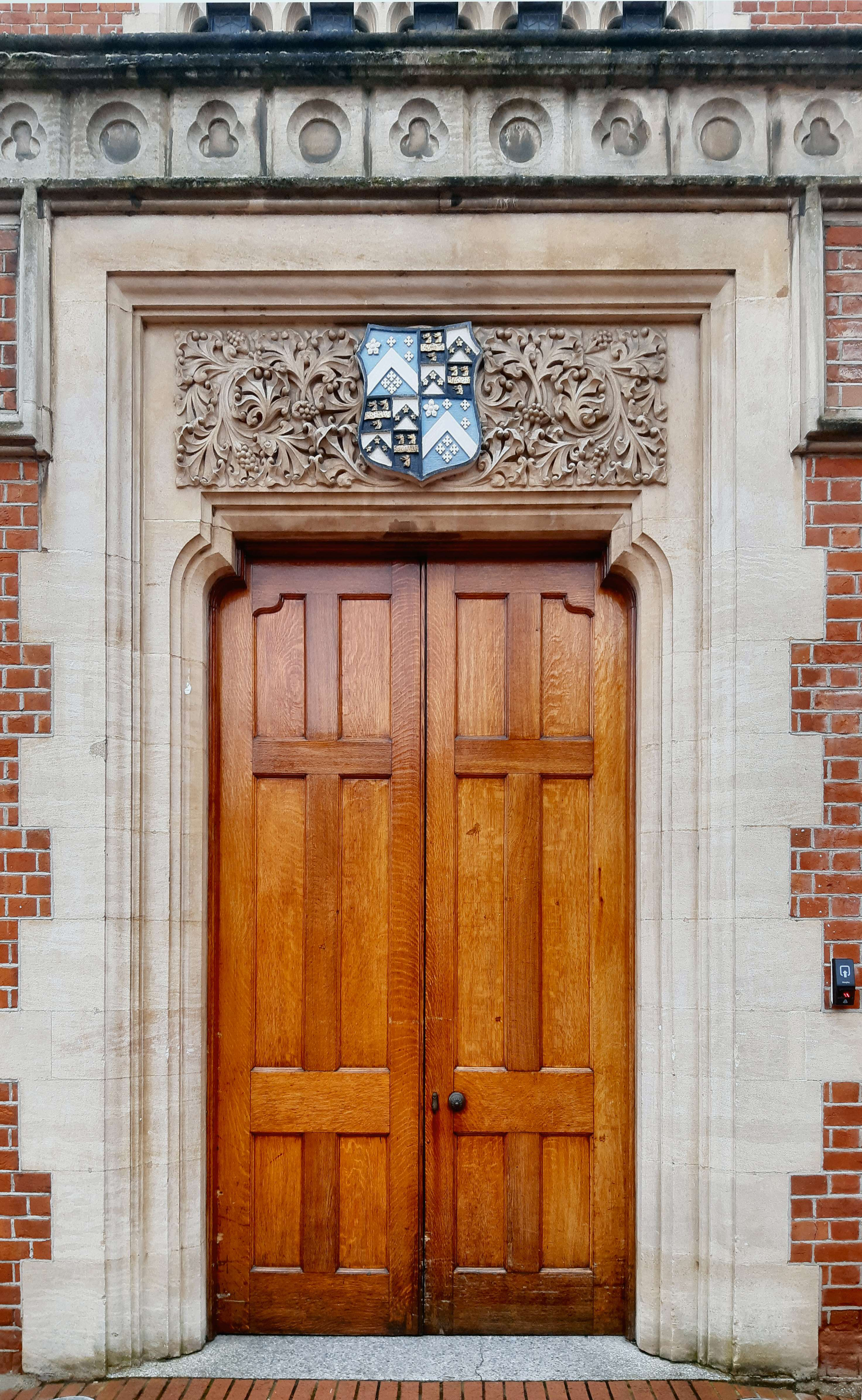
The north doorway, with Edward Latymer's crest and ornamental stonework

== School ==
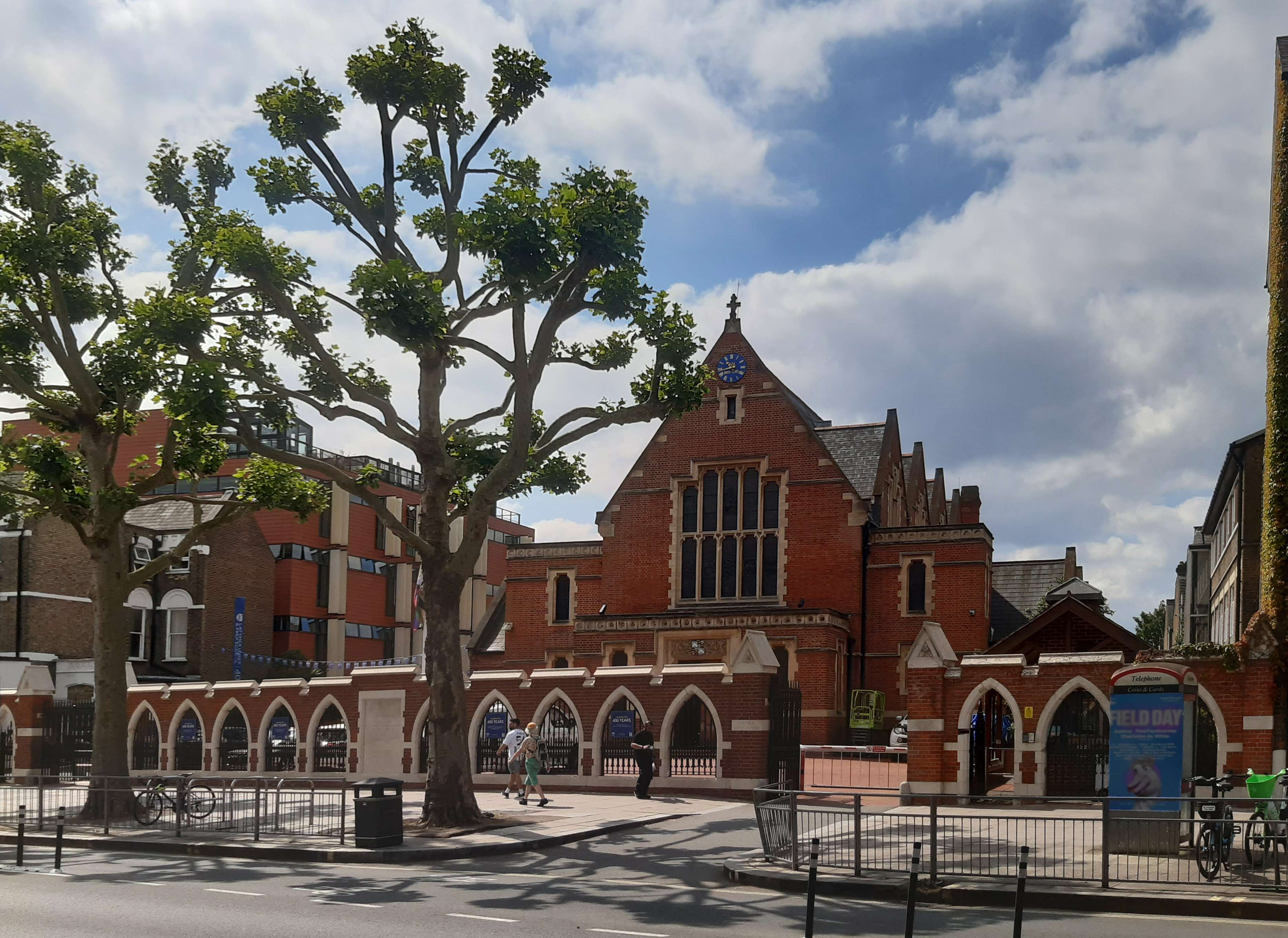
The school from King Street

=== Fees ===
Tuition for 2024 was £8,633 per term, (Note: There are 3 terms in the school year in the UK.) plus other mandatory and optional fees. Latymer offers a bursary programme, with assistance ranging between a quarter and the whole of the fees, according to need. One pupil in five received a bursary in 2022.

=== Activities ===
The Latymer Upper School Boat Club taught Andy Holmes, Olympic gold medal rower (1984 Games and 1988 Games), and the cox Henry Fieldman, Olympic bronze medal rower (2020 Games). The Boat Club has gone on to win Henley Royal Regatta, most recently with the win of the Diamond Jubilee Challenge Cup in 2019.

=== Facilities ===
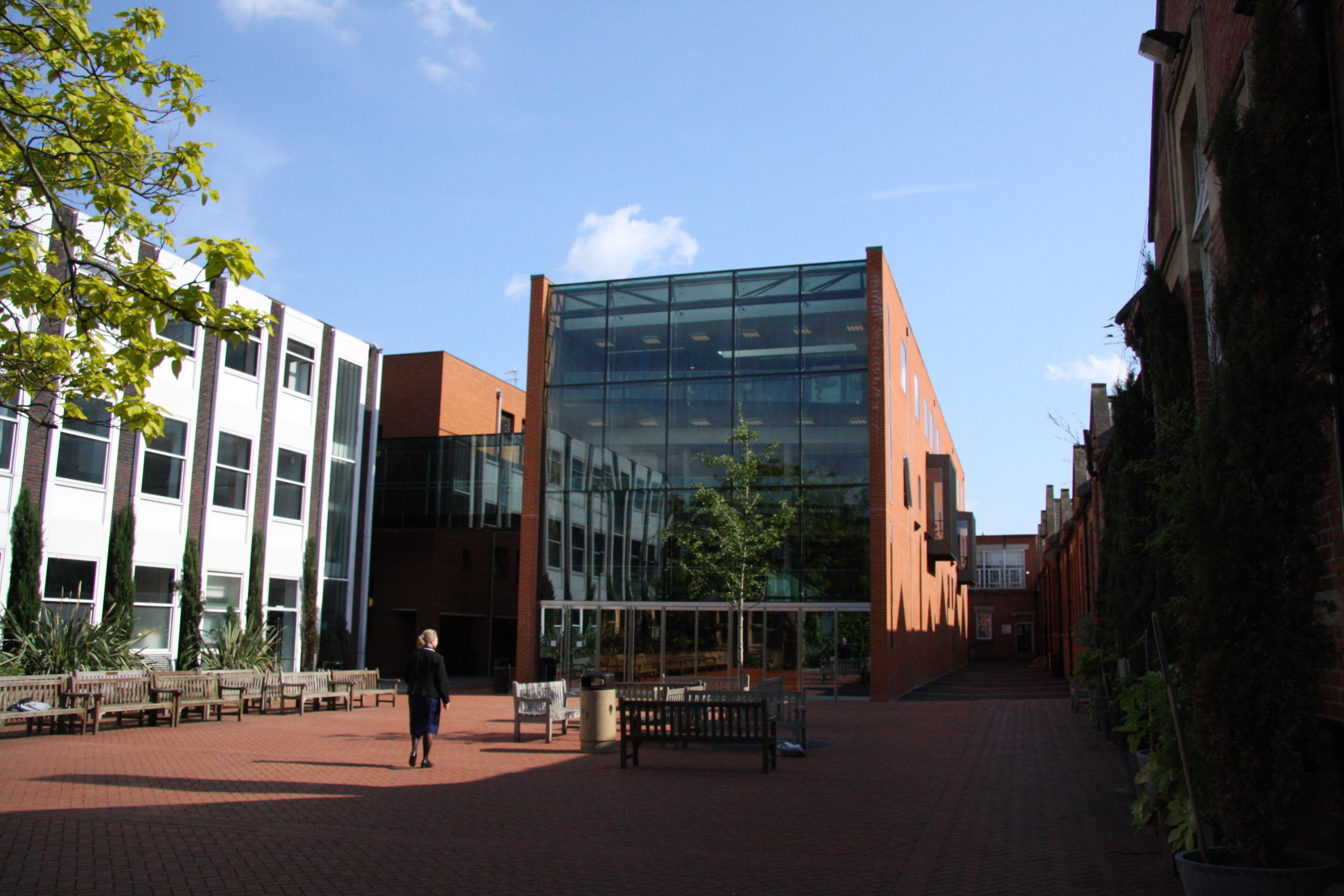
Latymer Performing Arts Centre

The Latymer Theatre and Arts Centre, opened in 2000, includes a 300-seat galleried box theatre named the Edward Latymer Theatre and an art gallery. The Latymer Performing Arts Centre contains a drama studio, rehearsal rooms, and a 100-seat recital hall. A new Science and Library building was completed in 2010.

The Sports Centre was opened in March 2016; it has a six-lane swimming pool, basketball hoops, badminton markings, cricket nets, a fitness suite, and a bouldering wall, and serves as an examination hall.

=== Coat of arms ===
The armorial bearings of the founder, Edward Latymer, included his Latin motto, Paulatim ergo certe ('Slowly therefore surely'). The motto puns on his surname, using an "i" in "(pau)latim er(go)", as Latin lacks the letter "y". In 2004 the school badge was simplified, dropping the motto, and retaining only the chevron on a blue field, with a single crosslet symbol. The crest was changed again to a form more like the original one in September 2020.

=== Academic performance ===
Latymer Upper School was rated in 2012 by the Tatler Schools Guide as one of the highest academically performing schools in the UK. Pupils sit an examination in English and mathematics to enter the school. There were 29 Oxbridge places in 2021, and several pupils went to US universities such as Brown, Columbia, Dartmouth, Harvard, Princeton, Stanford, and Cornell. GCSE and A-Level results over five years are summarised in the table.

GCSE summary

Year	%A*	%A*A	%A*AB
2019	77.8	92.1	98.2
2018	70.8	90.0	97.5
2017	70.6	91.2	98.5
2016	61.6	86.9	97.7
2015	69.7	92.2	98.8

A level summary

Year	%A*	%A*A	%A*AB
2019	31.8	70.7	91.2
2018	29.4	66.9	90.6
2017	34.8	74.7	92.2
2016	32.0	75.8	95.2
2015	32.1	73.3	91.7

== See also ==
- 1620s in England
- Gelehrtenschule des Johanneums (twinned school)
- Godolphin and Latymer School

== Bibliography ==
- Davis, Sian; Gregg, Christine Letter, eds. (2024). Latymer 400: The Latymer Foundation at Hammersmith 1624–2024. Profile Editions. ISBN 978-1-7881-6811-3.
- Watson, Nigel (1995). Latymer Upper School: A History of the School and its Foundation. James & James. ISBN 978-0-907383-62-8.
