= Feodary =

Feodary may refer to:

- A vassal or feudatory, a person who has entered into a mutual obligation to a lord or monarch in the context of the feudal system in mediaeval Europe.
- An appointee of the Court of Wards and Liveries of Tudor England
