= Godolphin and Latymer School =

Girls' school in Hammersmith, London, England

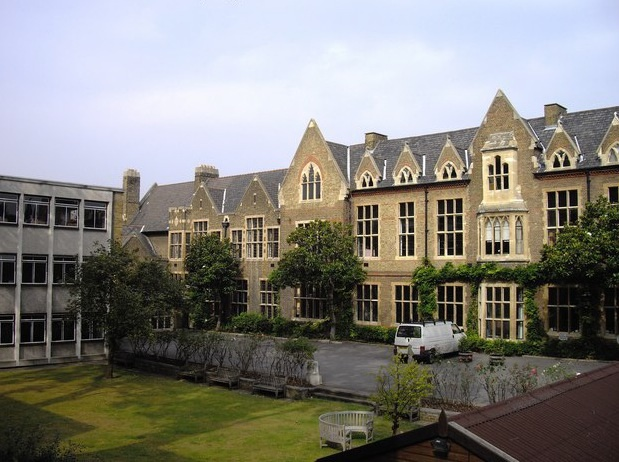

Location
- Iffley Road; Hammersmith, London, W6 0PG; England
- 51.4953°N 0.2301°W

Information
- Type: Private day school
- Motto: Francha Leale Toge (Free and Loyal Art Thou)
- Established: 1861; 165 years ago as a boys' school; re-established 1905 as a girls' school
- Local authority: Hammersmith and Fulham
- Head Mistress: Frances Ramsey
- Gender: Girls
- Age: 11 to 18
- Enrollment: Enrolment 800
- Houses: Bassi; Lovelace; Maathai; Naidu; Quinn-Brown; Sheppard
- Alumnae: Old Dolphins
- Website: Godolphin and Latymer School

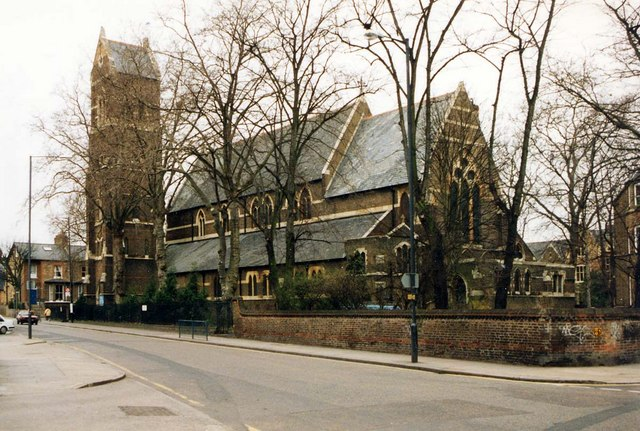
The former church of St John the Evangelist by William Butterfield now forms part of the school

The Godolphin and Latymer School is a private day school for girls in Hammersmith, West London.

The school motto is an ancient Cornish phrase, Francha Leale Toge, which translates as "free and loyal art thou". The school crest includes a double-headed white eagle, Godolphin in Cornish signifies a white eagle.

The Good Schools Guide called the school a "Very strong academic school with a friendly atmosphere, an outstanding head and a broad range of extra-curricular activities."

== History ==
A private act of Parliament, Godolphin's Estate Act 1697 (9 Will. 3. c. 19 Pr.), modified the wills of Sir William Godolphin (1634–96) in favour of his nephew Francis and niece Elizabeth and devoting £1,520 to charity. In 1703 this fund was used to purchase land west of St James's, Piccadilly, for education and other charitable purposes and, independently, in 1707 Elizabeth founded the Godolphin School, Salisbury, from her own resources. In 1856 the Godolphin School for boys was opened in Great Church Lane, Hammersmith. In 1862 The school relocated to the current Iffley Road site. Though initially successful, it closed in 1900. In 1905 it reopened as an independent day school for girls, associated with the Latymer Foundation and taking the name of the Godolphin and Latymer School.

From 1906 onwards it received grants from the London County Council and the Local Education Authority for equipment, library books and buildings. In 1939 the whole school was evacuated from London with no forward planning for where the school would stay. In 1951 the school became a state voluntary aided school under the Education Act 1944, and ceased to charge fees to pupils. After the abolition of the scheme, the school chose to revert to full independent status in 1977 rather than join the state system and turn comprehensive and resumed the charging of fees to pupils.

The Godolphin and Latymer School celebrated its centenary in May 2005 with a service at St Paul's Cathedral. In the same year the nearby church of St John the Evangelist, designed by William Butterfield and built in the late 1850s, was closed and acquired by the School on a 125-year lease. It has been converted into the Bishop Arts Centre, named after Dame Joyce Bishop, who was headmistress between 1935 and 1963.

== Notable alumnae ==
The poet and Nobel Laureate W. B. Yeats was a pupil on the current Iffley Road site, attending the Godolphin School between 1877 and 1881.

Notable former pupils of the girls' school, known as Old Dolphins, include:

- Sarah Alexander, actress
- Julia Barfield, architect
- Nada Bashir, journalist and foreign correspondent
- Kate Beckinsale, actress and model
- Georgina Born, academic, anthropologist, musicologist, and musician
- Sophie Ellis-Bextor, singer
- Susan Greenfield, Baroness Greenfield, scientist, writer, broadcaster, and member of the House of Lords
- Natasha Hausdorff, barrister and international law expert
- Florence Hirst, later Frances Bibby, mathematician and wife of Cyril Bibby
- Hattie Jacques, actress
- Sadie Jones, writer
- Carrie Johnson, Communications and PR advisor and wife of former Prime Minister Boris Johnson
- Julia King, Baroness Brown of Cambridge
- Nigella Lawson, food writer, journalist and broadcaster
- Davina McCall, actress and television presenter
- Candida Moss, writer and academic
- Lucy Punch, actress
- Jemma Redgrave, actor
- Annunziata Rees-Mogg, journalist and politician
- Hayaatun Sillem, CEO of the Royal Academy of Engineering
- Francesca Stavrakopoulou, writer and academic
- Winifred Watkins, biochemist
- Catherine Webb, author
- Zoe Williams, newspaper columnist

== See also ==
- Edward Latymer – English legal official
- Gelehrtenschule des Johanneums - twinned school
- Latymer Upper School – Private school in Hammersmith, London
- Godolphin School – Co-ed school in Salisbury, Wiltshire, England
