= Edward Latymer =

English legal official

- Born: c.1557 Ipswich, Suffolk
- Died: January 1627; Fleet Street, City of London
- Burial place: St Dunstan-in-the-West
- Occupation: Legal official at the Court of Wards and Liveries
- Known for: Founding The Latymer School and the Latymer Upper School
- Parents: William Latymer (father); Ellen (mother)
- Relatives: Josua Latymer (brother), Edmund English (half-brother)

Signature
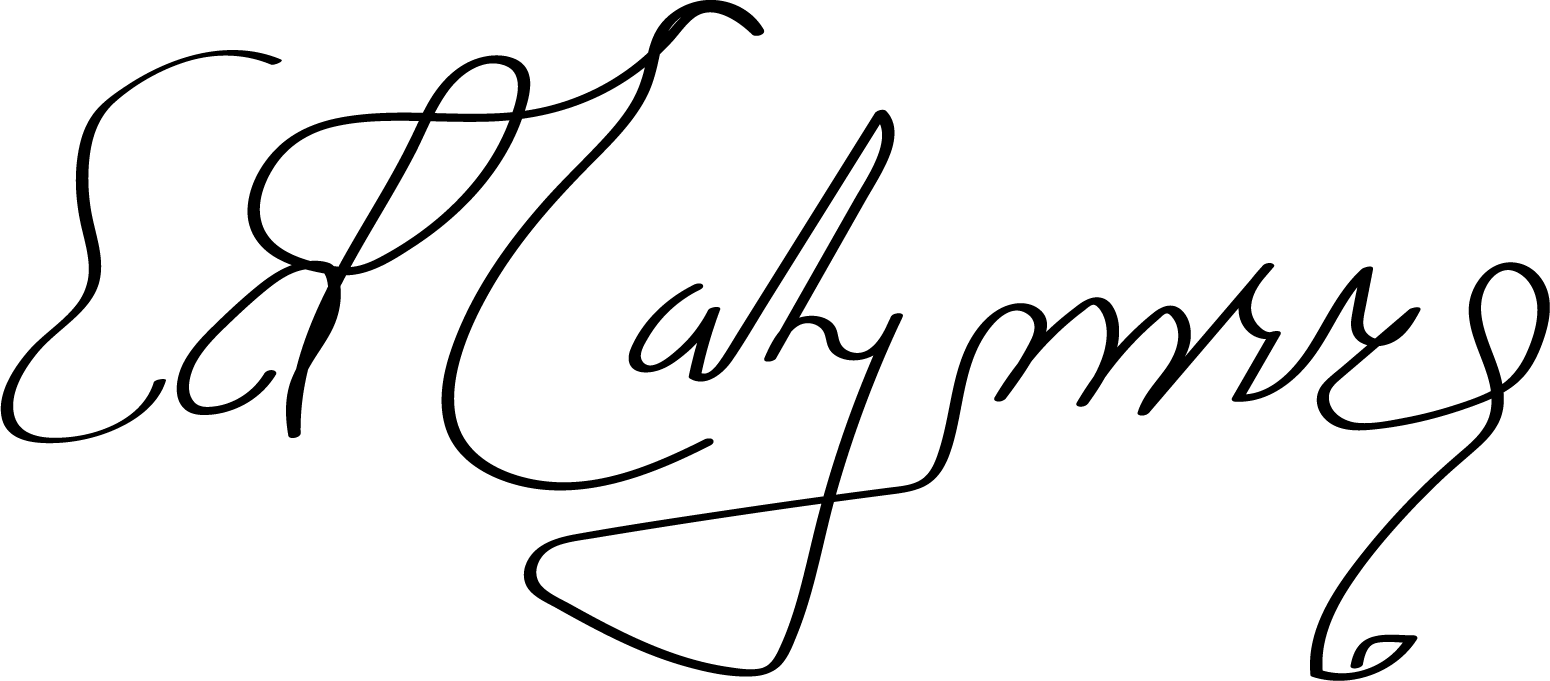

Edward Latymer (c. 1557 – January 1627) was an English attorney and clerk in the Court of Wards and Liveries in London. Born in Ipswich, he served as a deputy and clerk to the Receiver-General from 1594 to 1602 and later as a common attorney in the same court until 1626. Latymer is best known for his will, which established educational trusts that founded The Latymer School in Edmonton and Latymer Upper School in Hammersmith, and supported charitable initiatives for the poor. His legacy also includes associations with Godolphin and Latymer School.

== Early life ==
Edward Latymer was born in Ipswich, Suffolk, in 1557 during the expulsion of married clergy under the Catholic Queen Mary, to William Latymer, a clergyman and Marian exile who served as rector of St Stephen's and St Lawrence churches in Ipswich by 1556, and Ellen, a widow who had a son named Edmund English from her previous marriage. A younger brother, Josua, was born to William and Ellen later. His family descended from Suffolk gentry in Freston, where his ancestors had been minor landowners and lawyers since the 13th century.

In 1558, when Edward was an infant, Queen Elizabeth I came to the throne, ushering in a new era of Protestant stability, and shortly after, his father was restored to his former positions, and then becoming Treasurer of Westminster Abbey and Dean of Peterborough by 1560. At the age of two or three, Edward moved with his family to the Deanery at Peterborough, where his father’s appointments provided a secure environment amidst the religious and political shifts of the Elizabethan era.

== Education ==
Little is known about Edward Latymer’s early education, though it likely began under the guidance of his parents in Peterborough, where his father, William Latymer, as Dean, would have ensured a strong foundation in reading and writing, typical for a clerical family of the time. He may have attended the Queen’s Foundation school in Peterborough, established by Queen Katherine of Aragon, given his father’s position and connections to the cathedral. Edward possibly matriculated at St John’s College, Cambridge, at the age of fourteen in Easter 1571, though the record of an Edward Latimer at the university could refer to another individual.

== Career ==
Edward Latymer’s professional life unfolded over three decades in the Court of Wards and Liveries in London, where he held key roles that built his wealth and status. After beginning his legal training, he worked as clerk to the Receiver-General from 1594 to around 1602, followed by a long tenure as common attorney from 1601 to his death in 1627. His career success enabled him to acquire properties in Edmonton, Fulham, and Hammersmith, while residing in Fleet Street, assets that later funded his charitable efforts.

=== Early Career and Legal Training (1575 - 1591) ===
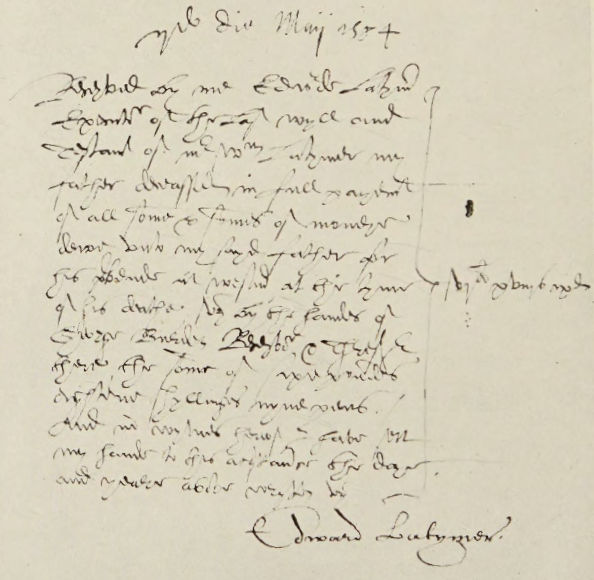
Receipt, signed by Edward Latymer, of his father's stipend as Prebendary of Westminster (2 May 1584)

Little is known about Edward Latymer’s early career, though he likely began his legal training after attending St John’s College, Cambridge, where he would have finished his studies by 1575, although there is no record of his graduation to confirm this. From 1575 to 1586, Edward was marked as an executor of his father’s will, a role that included receiving a payment of 6 pounds 18 shillings 9 pence from Westminster Abbey in 1584, which provided him with early financial resources as he began his professional life. In 1591, he took part in a private land transaction in Mildenhall, Suffolk, with Francis Gawdy, a lawyer who would later become head of the Court of Common Pleas, an activity that involved buying and reselling land for profit, a common practice among legal professionals of the time, and highlighted his expanding network and practical experience in property law, which prepared him for his future roles in the royal courts.

=== Clerk to the Court of Wards and Liveries (1594 - 1602) ===
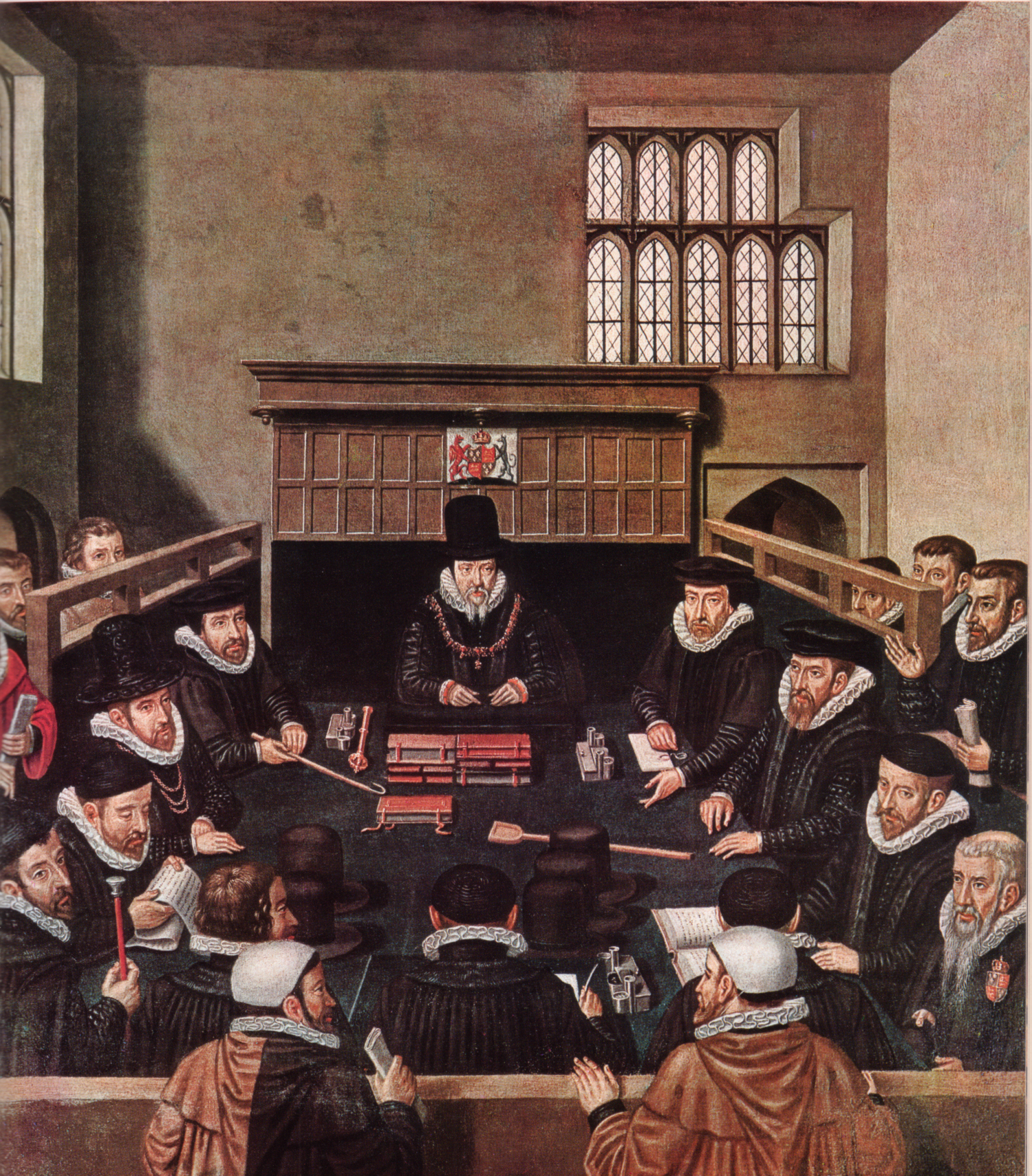
The Court of Wards and Liveries, c. 1585

In 1594, Edward Latymer was appointed clerk to William Fleetwood, the newly appointed Receiver-General of the Court of Wards, a position he secured through a recommendation from Richard Orrell, an Usher of Chancery, who facilitated a letter to Fleetwood’s brother Henry on May 17. Fleetwood took his oath on June 11, and Edward began his role shortly after, with Richard Richardson appointed as teller. On June 17 or 18, during a discussion at the Old Palace at Westminster, Edward’s salary was set at £30 yearly, though he also prepared an agreement in July, delivered to Fleetwood on September 3, outlining his duties, which included managing daily receipts, payments, bonds, and ledgers, while ensuring proper documentation for audits. Edward worked in an office in the Old Palace at Westminster, maintaining detailed records and often adding notes to seek advice from clerks or auditors before issuing acquittances or endorsing bonds. His first year proved challenging, with his initial audit in March 1595 requiring numerous corrections in his records, though he later celebrated its completion with payments for wine and gifts to auditors. In 1598, Edward revised a letter for Fleetwood to Lord Burghley on June 12, addressing financial pressures, and negotiated a £3000 payment to the Exchequer, a process complicated by procedural concerns over the warrant’s seal, which he noted for future reference. During this transaction, Edward sought advice from his half-brother Edmund, an Exchequer official, on the proper procedure for such payments, receiving a reply that confirmed the use of a teller’s bill rather than a tally, a practice Edward adopted to ensure accuracy. Edward continued in this role until around 1602, managing the court’s finances during a period of strain, including Fleetwood’s struggles with unexpended balances, before transitioning to a new position in the Court of Wards.

=== Common Attorney in the Court of Wards and Liveries (1601 - 1626) ===
In 1601, Edward Latymer was appointed one of the two common attorneys of the Court of Wards by Sir Robert Cecil on June 16, marking a significant advancement in his career within the court. His role involved representing the court’s interests in legal proceedings, managing wardships, and handling financial transactions, building on the administrative experience he gained as clerk. In 1600, prior to his appointment, Edward had negotiated a £9000 payment to the Privy Chamber on August 10, showcasing his growing influence in financial matters, and by April 13 of that year, he was lodging at “Sign of the Cock” in Fleet Street, indicating his established presence in London’s legal circles. He was re-sworn as attorney on May 12, 1603, following the accession of James I, ensuring continuity in his position. Edward’s tenure saw him managing significant wardships, including his first recorded wardship in 1597, though his role as attorney expanded his responsibilities in this area. In 1615, he contributed 22 shillings toward church repairs at St Dunstan’s in the West, reflecting his integration into the local community while continuing his legal work. Despite the plague in 1625, Edward worked through part of Trinity term in June and July, though he was absent during the Michaelmas term, likely due to the outbreak’s severity. That December, he sought an appointment in the King’s Bench on December 26, possibly aiming to secure a new role as his career in the Court of Wards neared its end. On June 9, 1626, Edward was ordered to provide a “light horse” at Edmonton, indicating his ongoing civic duties, and his last recorded appearance as an attorney in the Court of Wards was on June 29, 1626, marking the end of his long tenure.

== Property Acquisitions and Residences ==
=== Fleet Street ===
By 1600, Edward Latymer had established his residence in Fleet Street, lodging at “Sign of The Cock” by April 13, a location central to London’s legal community that supported his work in the Court of Wards. By 1615, he had moved to Ram Alley, Fleet Street, as recorded in the Churchwardens’ Accounts of St Dunstan’s in the West, where he contributed 22 shillings toward church repairs.

=== Edmonton ===
In 1615, at Easter, Edward Latymer purchased a house in Edmonton from Thomas Tomlinson and Joan Walker, described as a "messuage with a barn, garden, and orchard", for an estimated £100 or more, providing him with a suburban retreat outside London. In 1621, he was assessed for taxation at £10 in lands for the first of two subsidies granted to James I in September, a valuation that likely included this property.

Another source of his income was the rental from his property situated at Pymmes Brook on the main road to Scotland, which later became a coaching inn The Bell, and was renamed The Angel in 1780. It was demolished in 1968 through a compulsory purchase order for the widening of the North Circular Road.

=== Hammersmith and Fulham ===
In 1622, on June 1, Edward Latymer acquired the Manor of Butterwick and other lands in Fulham and Hammersmith, significantly expanding his estate, it consisted of 120 acres (49 ha) of land including meadows, pasture, and woods, the manor house, two houses on Brook Green, and four cottages. That year, he paid 13 shillings and 4 pence in taxes for the second installment of a subsidy granted to James I in April, reflecting the increased value of his holdings. In 1625, Edward paid £2 in taxes for the third of three subsidies granted to James I in April, and later that year, in December, he paid another £2 for the first of two subsidies granted to Charles I.

== Personal life ==
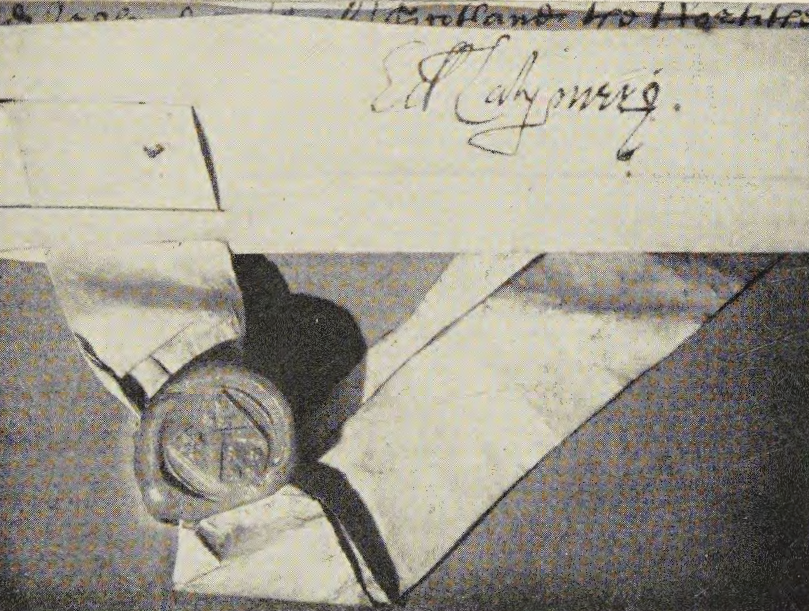
Signature and Seal of Edward Latymer (July 25, 1607)

Edward Latymer never married, leaving him without a wife or children, though he came from a landed family and maintained ties with relatives like his distant cousin Thomas Alured, with whom he often shared a home, and Richard Chamberlain, a fellow official at the Court of Wards who became a close friend through shared dinners and mutual courtesies during term times.

Edward’s religious beliefs were rooted in Protestantism, shaped by the era’s emphasis on faith and charity, which influenced his outlook and interactions. His personal life reflected the refinements of a well-to-do gentleman, evident in his possessions like gilt and silver bowls, Canary cups, Damask napkins, a clock, standing cup, flaxen sheets, and Turkey work chairs, which highlighted the comforts he enjoyed.

== Bequest and death ==
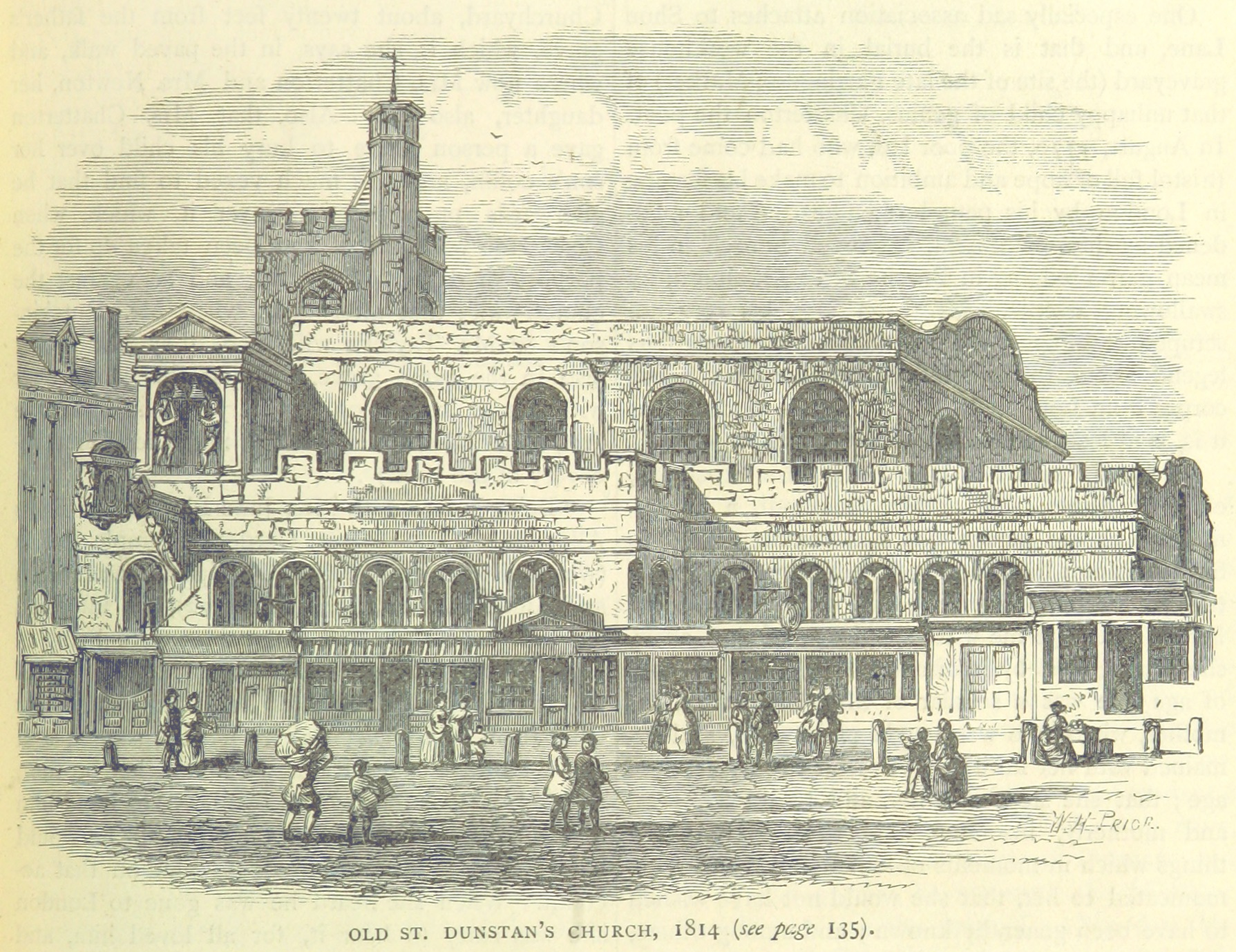
Old St Dunstan's Church in 1814, similar to how it would have looked when Edward Latymer was buried there

In 1625, he made his will (dated 1624), bequeathing most of his wealth to benefit the people of Hammersmith and the Parish of St Dunstan’s, today known as Latymer Upper School, as well as a smaller bequest for the Parish of Edmonton, now The Latymer School. His provisions included clothing and education for eight poor boys from each of the parishes of Edmonton and Fulham (which then included Hammersmith). The stated aim of this education was practical and social rather than academic; the boys were to be taught to read English at existing petty schools until the age of thirteen, specifically "to keepe them from idle and vagrant courses." The clothing, marked with a red cross on the left sleeve, was distributed twice a year on Ascension Day and All Saints' Day.

His will also allocated other significant sums for the poor, including £200 for releasing people from eight London prisons "onely for debt or onely for want of money to pay their fees," and another £200 to provide for the "preferment in marriage" of "poore young maides." The administration of these charitable trusts was overseen by separate groups of trustees for each parish.

Latymer died in January 1627 and was buried on the 20th of that month in the south aisle of St Dunstan-in-the-West, Fleet Street, where he would worship. The Churchwardens' Accounts of St Dunstan’s document the expenses for his burial, including payments for the burial plot, knell, peals, and burial cloth. His funeral was notable for its scale, with sixty-six poor men, each provided with mourning cloaks and a small monetary sum, accompanying the procession. A sermon was preached at his funeral, for which he had arranged a payment of twenty shillings. It is possible that the service was conducted by John Donne, the Dean of St Paul's Cathedral and then Vicar of St Dunstan's, who was mentioned in Latymer’s will.

Despite his clear testamentary instructions, Latymer’s relatives, Thomas and Bartrum Themilthorpe, contested his will in the Court of Chancery, leading to a protracted legal dispute. They argued that as his closest living male relatives, they had a stronger claim to the estate than the charitable trusts. Thomas was the son of Nicholas Themilthorpe (Latymer's first cousin 1x removed) by his second wife, while Bartrum claimed to be the son of Nicholas by his first wife, though his legitimacy was questioned. The challenge resulted in a seven-year delay before the charitable bequests could take effect.

== Legacy ==
Edward Latymer’s provisions for education and charity have left a tangible mark, most notably through the development of Latymer Upper School and The Latymer School, which continue to function as significant institutions in London.

Latymer Upper School in Hammersmith emerged from modest beginnings linked to his bequests, evolving over time into a prominent independent school. By the end of the 19th century, it had settled at its current King Street location, with a major expansion following World War II. The Latymer Foundation, managing aspects of his charitable estate, also played a role beyond Latymer Upper, notably in 1905 when it supported the reopening of the struggling Godolphin School as a new independent day school for girls on a nearby Hammersmith site, leading to the establishment of the Godolphin and Latymer School. Today, Latymer Upper enrolls over 1,400 students in a co-educational setting, the school features modern facilities such as a performing arts centre and a riverside boat house. Its funding relies on tuition fees, augmented by endowments from Latymer’s estate that support bursaries for about a quarter of its students. The school’s academic standing places it among Britain’s higher-performing independent institutions.

The Latymer School in Edmonton, meanwhile, took a different trajectory within the state education system. Starting as just a grammar school, it relocated to Haselbury Road in 1910 amid North London’s growth. It adapted to legislative changes, becoming a voluntary-aided grammar school in 1988, while retaining its selective admissions based on academic ability. Serving around 1,300 students, it maintains a strong academic record, often appearing in national performance rankings. Public funding sustains its operations, with some additional support derived from Latymer’s historical endowment. One of its school houses is named after Edward and called "Latymer House."

Traces of Latymer himself have proven less enduring. Following his death in 1627, he was buried in the southern aisle of St Dunstan-in-the-West, as the church stood at that time, but his will included no instructions for a stone or monument to mark his grave, leaving it without distinction. When St Dunstan’s was dismantled and reconstructed in the 1830s to allow for the widening of Fleet Street, Latymer’s unmarked burial site was lost. Today, a Coat of Arms marker commemorating Edward Latymer exists in All Saints’ Church, Edmonton, placed there by the Latymer Foundation in 1983 as a belated recognition of his connection to the area.

Beyond the schools, Latymer’s legacy is commemorated in the naming of Latimer Road and nearby Freston Road in Kensington (the latter tied to his ancestral surname of Freston) alongside Latymer Road and Latymer Way in Edmonton, which reflect his impact in that community.

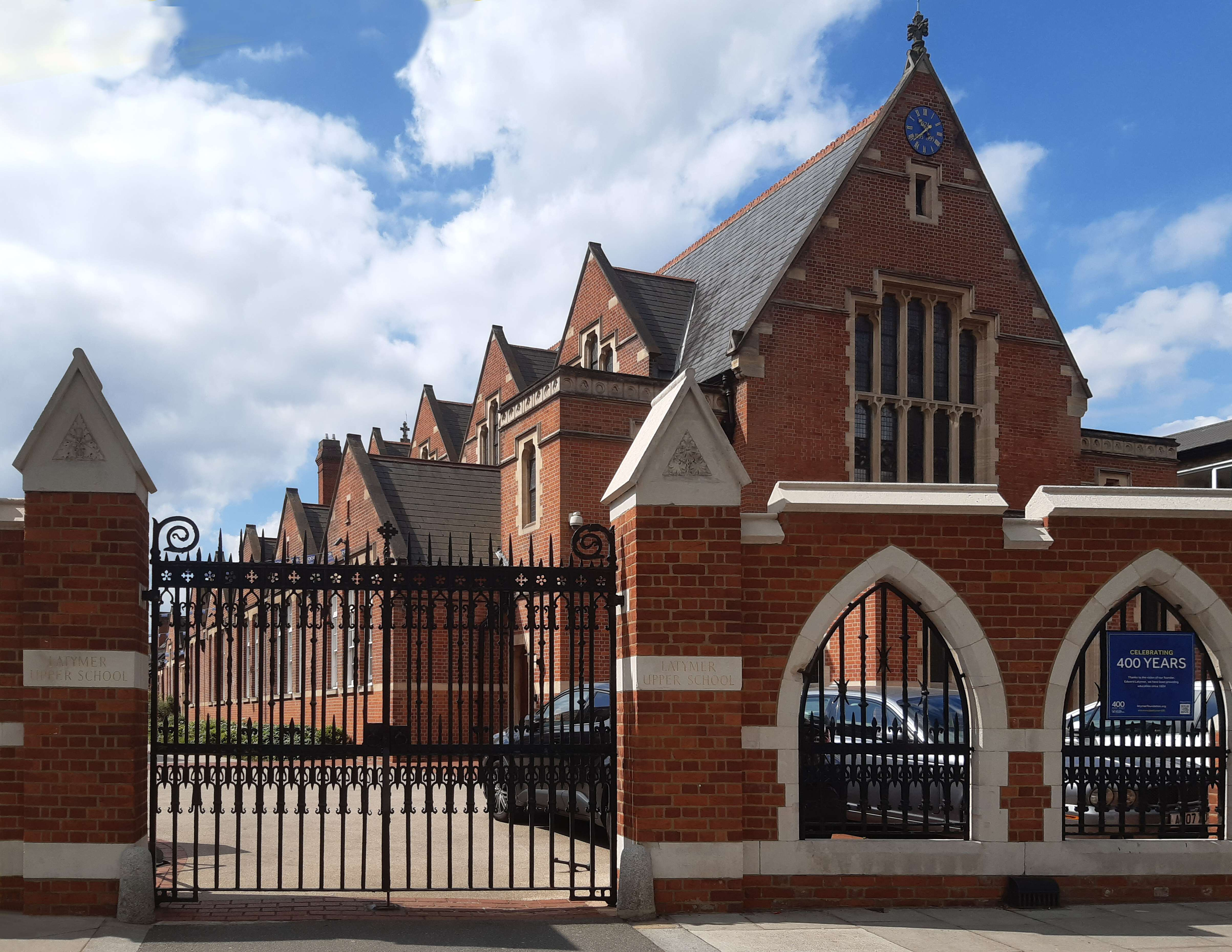
Latymer Upper School, Hammersmith

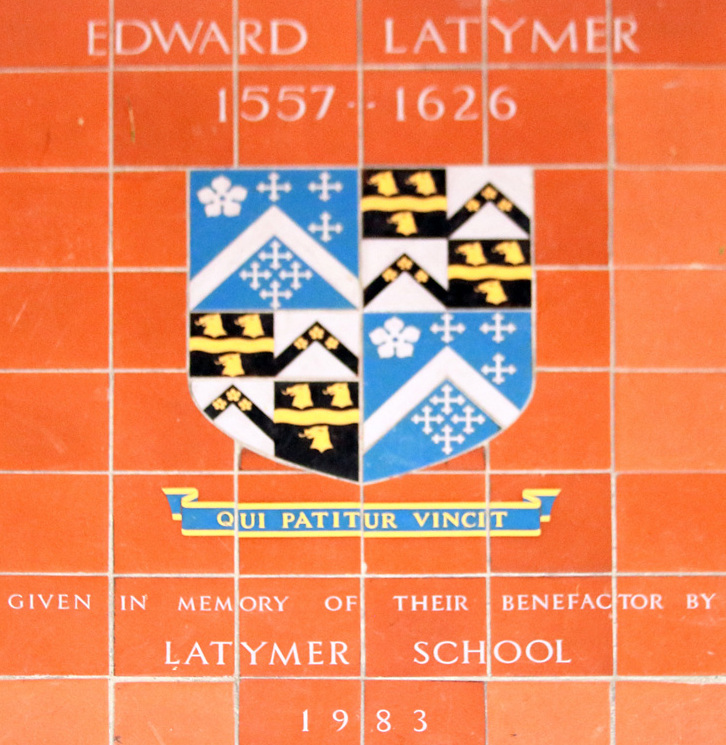
Coat of arms of Edward Latymer in All Saints' Church, Edmonton

The Latymer School, Edmonton

== Depictions in Art ==
No authenticated visual representations of Edward Latymer are known to exist. Despite this, two images are frequently and erroneously associated with him, often appearing in historical discussions or online searches. These misattributions have persisted due to historical errors and lack of primary source material. Below, each image is examined in detail to clarify its origins and debunk the misconceptions:

=== Hugh Latimer Trace ===
Painting claimed to be Edward Latymer

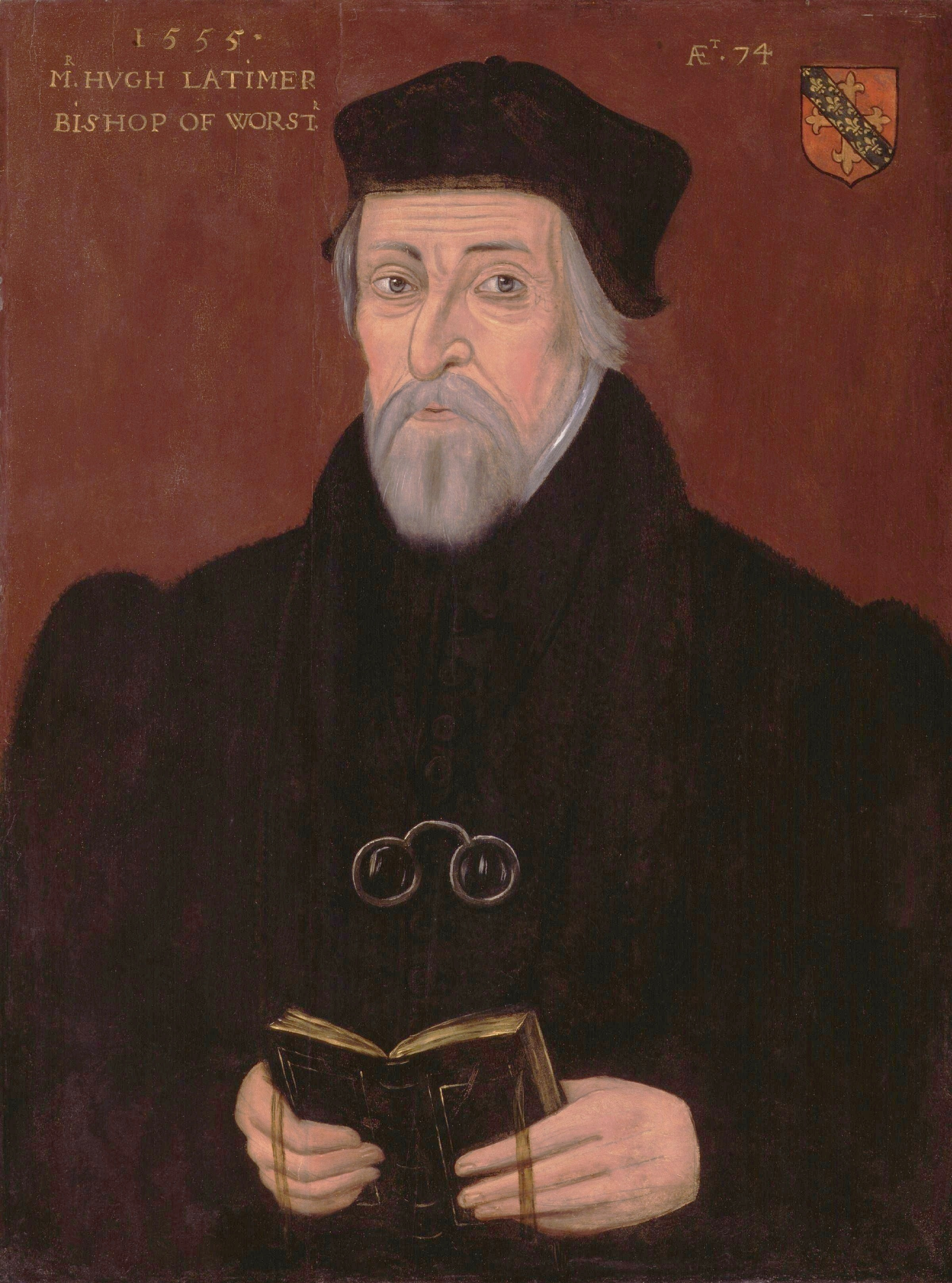
Painting of Hugh Latimer

This image originates from The Latymer School in Edmonton, where it was once featured on the school's website to illustrate "Latymer House" and was later used to represent Edward during the 400th anniversary in 2024. However, the image is unmistakably a traced or reproduced version of a well-known painting of Hugh Latimer, the 16th-century English bishop and Protestant martyr. The confusion likely arose from the similarity in surnames.

=== The Court of Wards Painting ===
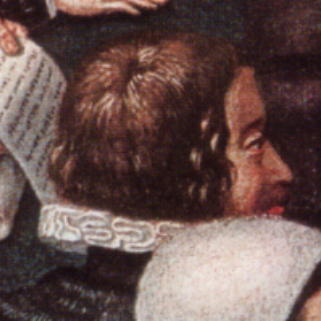

A 1588 painting of the Court of Wards and Liveries was thought by William Wheatley to include him. Wheatley’s assumption was based on a letter from Edmund English, misdated as 1578 instead of 1598, leading him to believe Latymer was present during the painting’s creation. The painting’s key identifies various figures, including clerks, and Wheatley focused on a younger-looking third clerk as a potential depiction of Latymer. However, the corrected letter date and historical records, such as the Receiver-General’s Accounts, confirm Latymer’s clerkship began after 1588, and no clerks in the painting can be definitively identified as him.
