= Tenures Abolition Act 1660 =

Act of the Parliament of England

Tenures Abolition Act 1660 (Note: The citation of this act by this short title was authorised by section 5 of, and the second schedule to, the Statute Law Revision Act 1948. Due to the repeal of those provisions, it is now authorised by section 19(2) of the Interpretation Act 1978.)
- Act of Parliament
- Parliament of England
- Long title: An Act takeing away the Court of Wards and Liveries and Tenures in Capite and Knights Service and Purveyance, and for setling a Revenue upon His Majesty in Lieu thereof. (Note: These words are printed against this act in the second column of the second schedule to the Statute Law Revision Act 1948, which is headed "Title".)
- Citation: 12 Cha. 2. c. 24
- Territorial extent: England and Wales

Dates
- Royal assent: 24 December 1660
- Commencement: 25 April 1660 (Note: Start of session.)

Other legislation
- Repeals/revokes: Court of Wards Act 1540; Wards and Liveries Act 1541
- Amended by: Continuance of Laws, etc. Act 1749; Statute Law Revision Act 1863; Statute Law Revision Act 1888; Administration of Estates Act 1925; Statute Law Revision Act 1948; Criminal Law Act 1967; Family Law Reform Act 1969; Statute Law (Repeals) Act 1969; Guardianship Act 1973
- Relates to: Confirmation of Acts Act 1661

Status: Amended

Text of statute as originally enacted

Revised text of statute as amended

Text of the Tenures Abolition Act 1660 as in force today (including any amendments) within the United Kingdom, from legislation.gov.uk.

The Tenures Abolition Act 1660 (12 Cha. 2. c. 24), sometimes known as the Statute of Tenures, is an act of the Parliament of England which changed the nature of several types of feudal land tenure in England. The long title of the act was An Act takeing away the Court of Wards and Liveries, and Tenures in Capite, and by Knights-service, and Purveyance, and for settling a Revenue upon his Majesty in Lieu thereof.

Passed by the Convention Parliament in 1660, shortly after the English Restoration, the act replaced various types of military and religious service that tenants owed to the Crown with socage, and compensated the monarch with an annual fixed payment of £100,000 to be raised by means of a new tax on alcohol. (Frankalmoin, copyhold, and certain aspects of grand serjeanty were excluded.) It completed a process that had begun in 1610 during the reign of James I with the proposal of the Great Contract.

The act made constitutional gestures to reduce feudalism and removed the monarch's right to demand participation of certain subjects in the Army. By abolishing feudal obligations of those holding those feudal tenures other than by socage, such as by a knight's fee, it standardised most feudal tenancies of the aristocracy and gentry. The act converted more of their tenures into ones which demanded nil or negligible impositions to the Crown. While socage usually implied rent to be payable to the monarch, no rent was paid in the form of free and common socage as interpreted by the courts. Instead the act introduced and appointed collection offices and courts to administer a new form of taxation, called excise. Excise duty imposed taxation on the general public to provide an income for the monarch, its ministers and civil servants, to replace these relatively common feudal tenures among the landed classes.

== Provisions ==
Section 3 of the act repealed the Court of Wards Act 1540 (32 Hen. 8. c. 46) the Wards and Liveries Act 1541 (33 Hen. 8. c. 22), thereby abolishing the Court of Wards and Liveries, established in 1540, which had been responsible for revenue collection under the feudal tenure system. It was also the first act (under its section 14) to impose an excise duty on tea, as well as on coffee, sherbet and chocolate; the duty was placed on the manufactured beverage, and not the raw tea or coffee, treating it in much the same way as beer or spirits.

The act also let any father, by last will and testament, designate a guardian for his children. The rights of this guardian superseded those of the children's mother. Sarah Abramowicz notes the ironic erosion of the father's parental rights after the 1660 act.

== Subsequent developments ==
Section 22 of the act was repealed from 10 May 1750 by section 12 of the Continuance of Laws, etc. Act 1749 (23 Geo. 2. c. 26), which came into force on 16 November 1749.

Section 14 from "For all Metheglin" to the end of the section and sections 15, 19–23 and 25 to the end of the act were repealed by section 1 of, and the schedule to, the Statute Law Revision Act 1863 (26 & 27 Vict. c. 125), which came into force on 28 July 1863.

Section 7 of the act from "tenures in franke almoigne" to "nor to take away." was repealed by section 56 of, and part I of the second schedule to, the Administration of Estates Act 1925 (15 & 16 Geo. 5. c. 23), which came into force on 1 January 1926.

The whole act, so far as unrepealed, except sections 4 and 9, was repealed by section 1 of, and part III of the schedule to, the Statute Law (Repeals) Act 1969, which came into force on 1 January 1970.

The act was partly in force in the United Kingdom at the end of 2010, though only section 4:

And that all tenures hereafter to be created by the Kings Majestie his Heires or Successors upon any gifts or grants of any Mannours Lands Tenements or Hereditaments of any Estate of Inheritance at the common Law shall be in free and common Soccage, and shall be adjudged to be in free and common Soccage onely, and not by Knight service or in Capite, and shall be discharged of all Wardship value and forfeiture of Marriage Livery Primer-Seizin Ouster le main Aide pur (Note: pur means for or through as in pur autre vie, for the life[span] of another) faier fitz Chivalier (Note: the son of a knight) & pur file marrier, (Note: "line married" i.e. married lineage) Any Law Statute or reservation to the contrary thereof any wise notwithstanding.

== Bibliography ==
- Costin, W. C.; Watson, J. Steven, eds. (1952). The Law & Working of the Constitution: Documents 1660–1914. Vol. I (1660–1783). A&C Black. pp. 2–4.
- "Charles II, 1660: An Act takeing away the Court of Wards and Liveries and Tenures in Capite and by Knights Service and Purveyance, and for settling a Revenue upon his Majesty in Lieu thereof". Statutes of the Realm. Vol. 5: 1628–80. 1819. pp. 259–266 – via British History Online.
- Perrins, Bryn (1 January 2000). Understanding Land Law (1 ed.). Routledge Cavendish. ISBN 1-85941-538-5.
