= Scribble =

Scribble may refer to:

- Scribble (band), post punk synth pop band
- "Scribble" (song), by electronic group Underworld
- Scribble, album by American rapper Esham
- SCRIB, also known as Scribble, a scaffold protein which in humans is encoded by the SCRIB gene

== See also ==
- DJ Skribble (born 1968), American DJ and producer
- Scribbler
- Scrabble (disambiguation)
- Doodle
