= Susan Wijeratna =

School teacher

Susan Wijeratna is a British educator, and head of Latymer Upper School. She previously served as Lower Master at Eton College, the first woman in that role.

== Biography ==
Susan Cook was born in May 1969. She is the daughter of John Cook, a schoolmaster, previously head of Epsom College. She was educated at Brighton College and took her bachelor's degree in geography at the University of Birmingham.

Wijeratna's first teaching job was at Epsom College. She next moved to Eastbourne College and then became head of geography at St Benedict's School, Ealing. She served as the deputy head of St Paul's Girls' School, responsible for pastoral affairs.

Wijeratna became the first woman Lower Master (deputy head) of Eton College on her appointment there in September 2017. Bedales School praised Eton for the appointment.

In 2019 she became a director of the Royal Ballet School. She is Chair of Governors at St Stephen's Church of England Primary School in West London. In January 2023, she was announced as the new head of Latymer Upper School, to take up the appointment in September.

== Personal life ==
Wijeratna is married to Alex Wijeratna, an environmental activist. They have two daughters.
