= Bradmore House =

Coordinates: 51.491782°N 0.224548°W

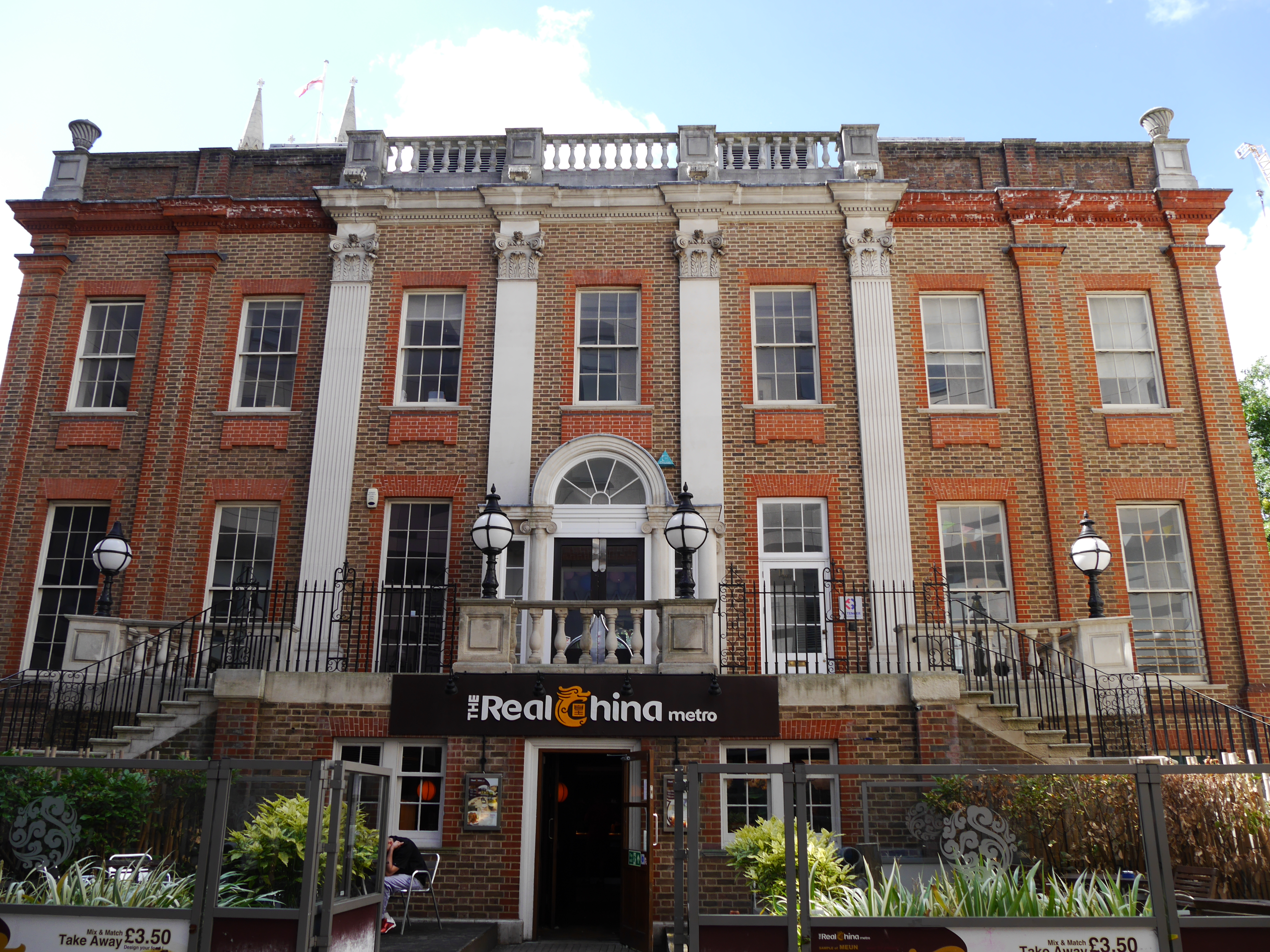
Bradmore House in 2014

Bradmore House is a Grade II listed building in Queen Caroline Street, Hammersmith, London. The original house was part of Butterwick Manor House, owned by Edward Latymer. it had two storeys. The building was dismantled and rebuilt on a plinth with an external staircase at the front, forming a three-storey structure.

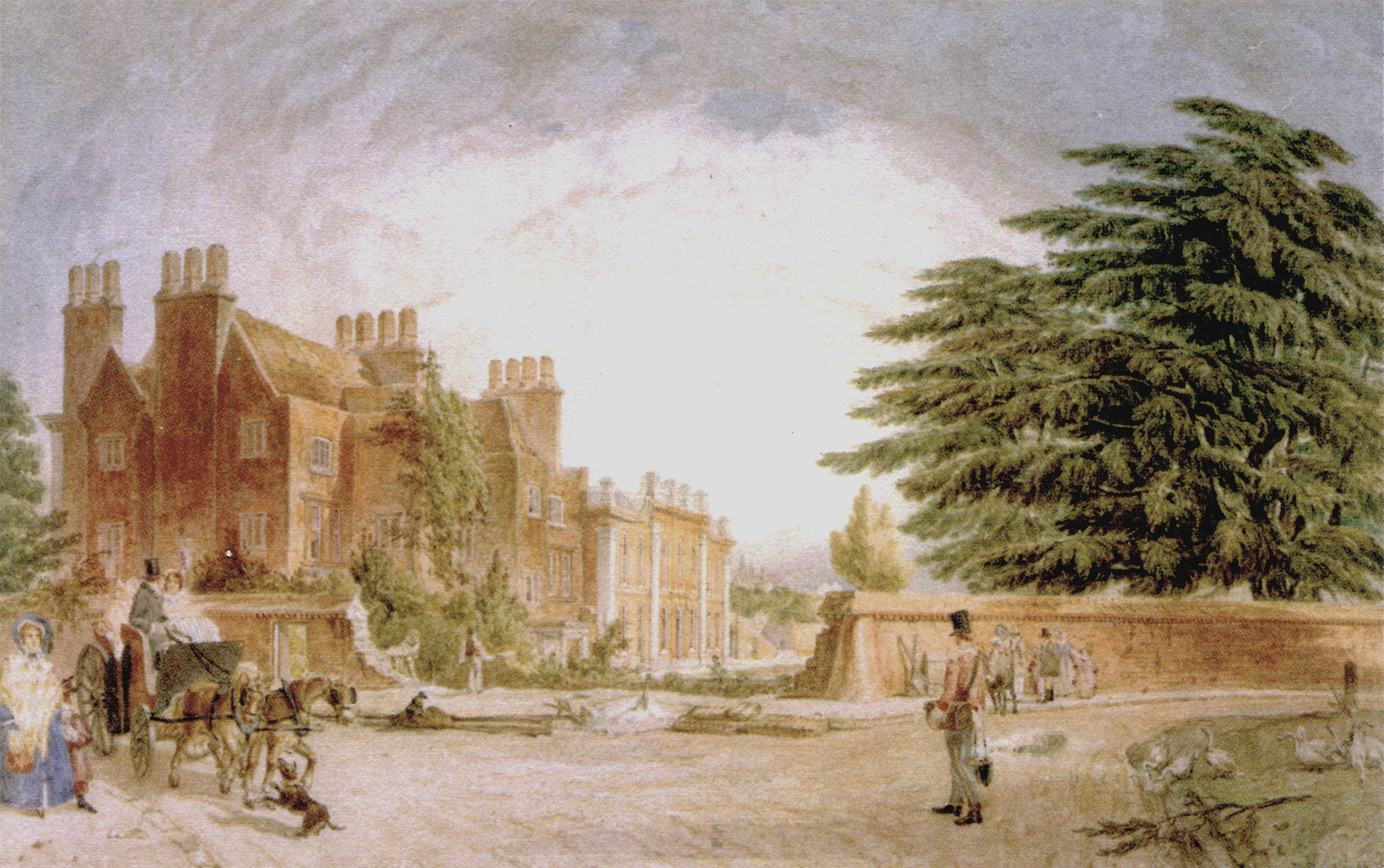
View of Butterwick House and its south wing, Bradmore House. Watercolour by Robert Blemmell Schnebbelie, 1839.

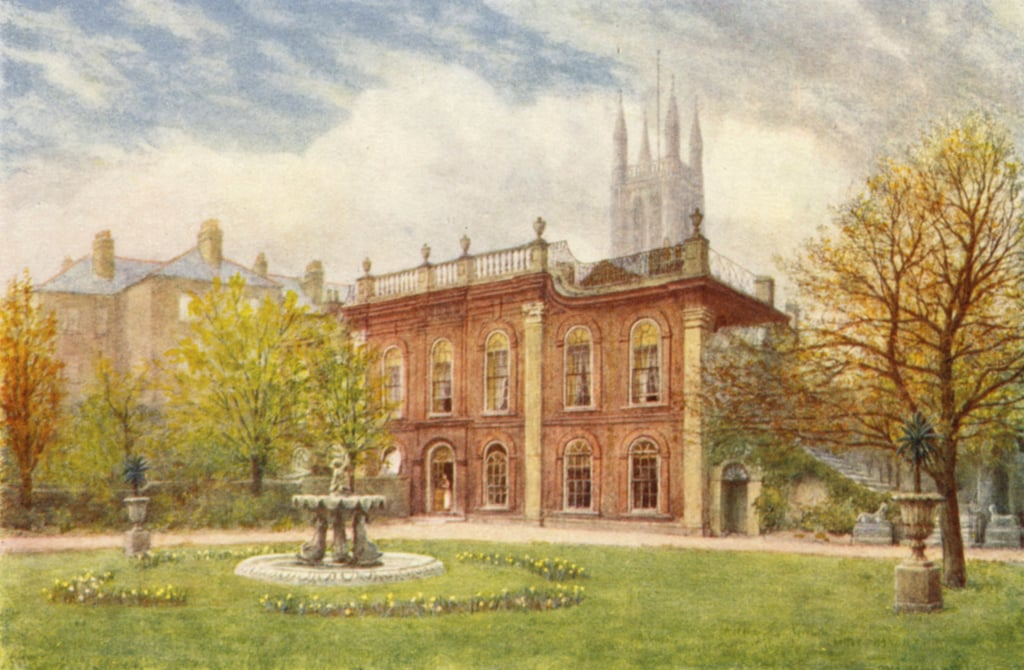
Bradmore House, Queen Caroline Street, Hammersmith: all that survives of Butterwick Manor. 1904 lithograph by Philip Norman.
