= Pure (restaurant chain) =

Fast food chain based in London, United Kingdom

- Type: Private
- Industry: Retail outlets
- Founded: 2009
- Headquarters: City Of London, London, United Kingdom; 1 Finsbury Circus, EC2M 6AB
- Number of locations: ▲14 (January 2018)
- Area served: London, United Kingdom
- Key people: Spencer Craig (Founder and CEO) and Edward Bentley (Co-Founder)
- Products: Salads, Sandwiches, Hot Food, Juices, Snacks and Coffee.
- Number of employees: ▲243+ (January 2018)
- Website: https://www.pure.co.uk

Pure is a healthy food to go chain based in London, United Kingdom.

== History ==
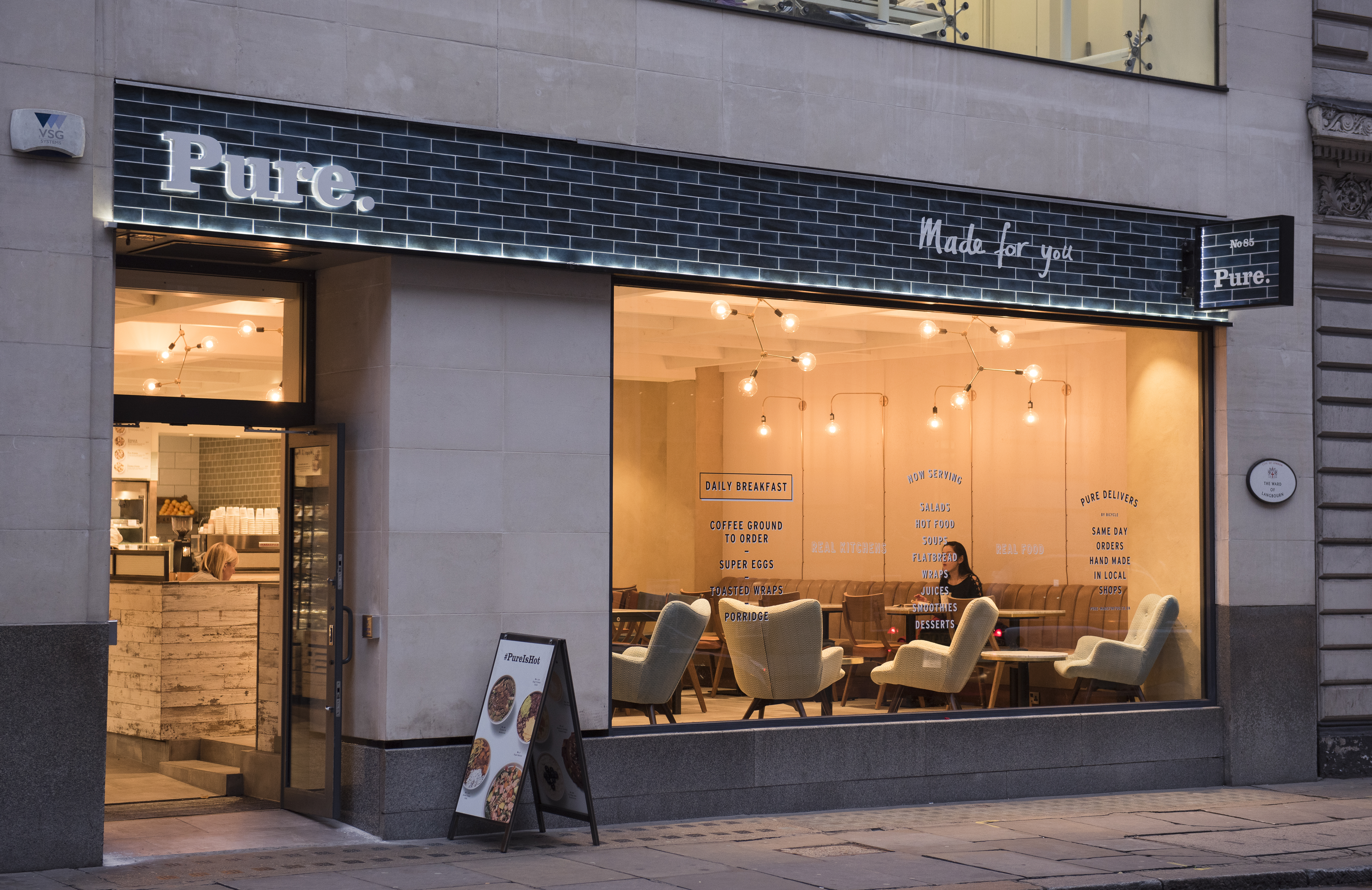
Pure, Gracechurch street, London

The company was founded by Spencer Craig and Ed Bentley with the first Pure store opening in Beak Street, Soho, in 2009.

In 2015, Pure was included in The Sunday Times Fast Track 100 as one of the fastest growing and profitable companies of 2015 with a 65% annual sales rise over 3 years.

In 2016 Whitbread, the FTSE 100 leisure group behind Premier Inn bought a 49 per cent stake in the company, acquired for £6.8m and having the option to buy the remainder of the company within the next five years.At the time of the deal Pure operated eight outlets, including in Moorgate and Soho, and had reported sales of around £7.8 million in the previous year.

Pure was included again in 2016 in The Sunday Times Fast Track 100, consolidating the company as one of the most prominent options in the food chain market.

As of January 2019, Pure has 18 shops opened in London, mainly based in the City and around Soho. Pure employs more than 400 people among team members, assistant managers, and General Managers.

== Menu ==
Pure’s menu includes breakfast items, salads, wraps, juices and smoothies, hot drinks, pots and snacks.

The company uses organic and seasonal ingredients, advertising that their food is freshly made every day in the kitchen at each store.
