= Cards Galore =

British greeting card store chain

- Founded: 1990s
- Headquarters: United Kingdom
- Number of locations: 50+
- Area served: United Kingdom
- Products: Greetings Cards
- Website: cardsgalore.co.uk

Cards Galore is a British chain of greeting card stores, founded in the 1990s by Rajesh Shah. It operated over 50 stores in the UK. Most of the stores are in central London, with only six outside the capital. Metro included them in their March 2016 list of "22 things you’ll only know if you work in central London"

The chain went into administration in April 2021, with Shah blaming COVID-19 lockdown for loss of trade, although some stores continued to operate.
