= Scribbler (card shop) =

British chain of greetings card retail shops

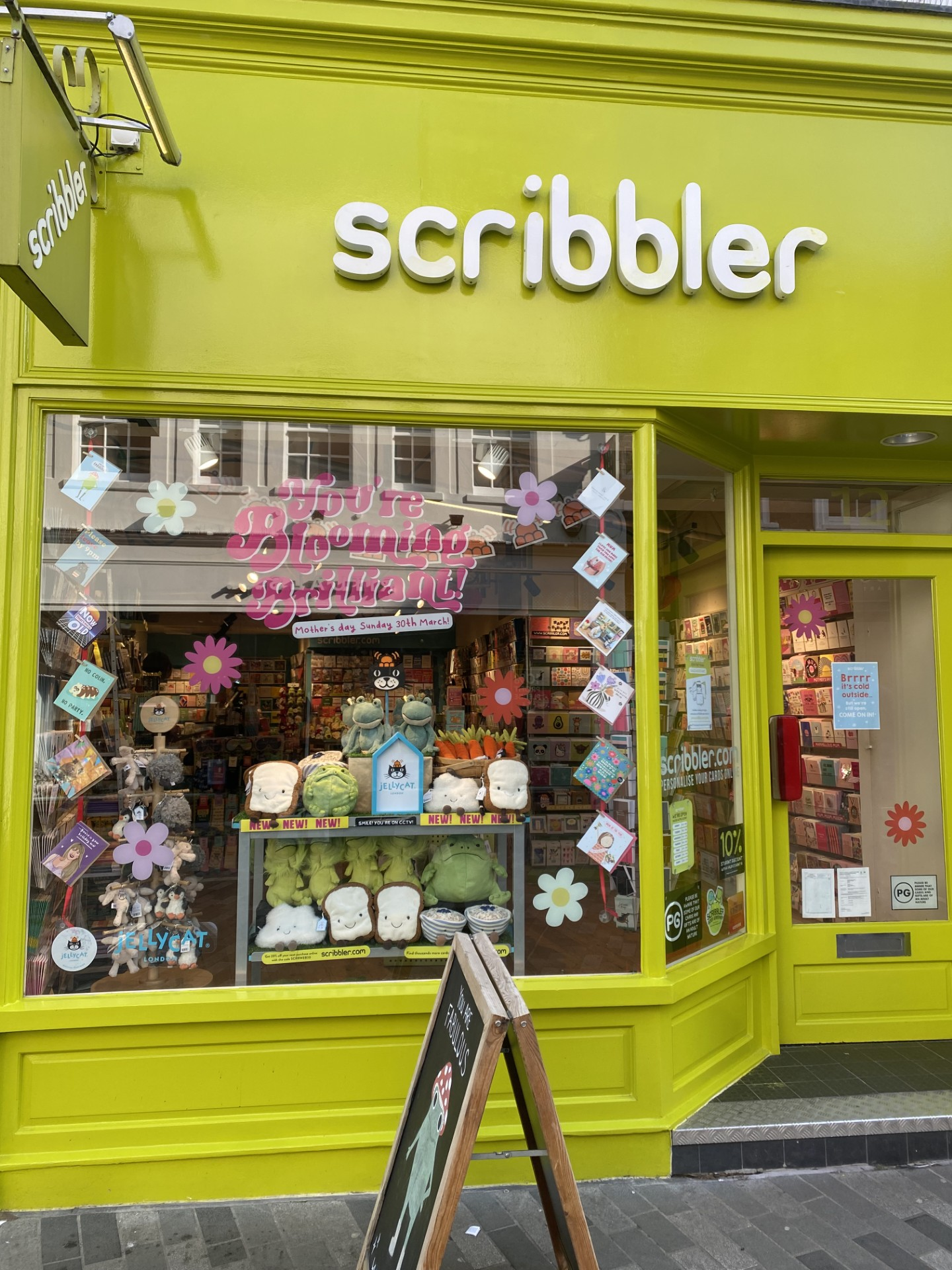
Scribbler, Church Street, Kingston upon Thames, 2025

Scribbler is a British chain of greeting card and gift retailers. As of 2025, they have 36 shops throughout the UK.

Scribbler was founded in 1981 by John and Jennie Procter, and as of 2025, is still run by the original management team. Scribbler states that they are "at the forefront of edgy humour and great design.”
