= Court of Wards and Liveries =

Court in England 1540–1660

Court of Wards Act 1540
- Act of Parliament
- Parliament of England
- Long title: An Act for the Establishment of the Court of the King's Wards.
- Citation: 32 Hen. 8. c. 46
- Territorial extent: England and Wales

Dates
- Royal assent: 24 July 1540
- Commencement: 12 April 1540 (Note: Start of session.)
- Repealed: 25 April 1660
Other legislation
Amended by	Wards and Liveries Act 1541
Repealed by	Tenures Abolition Act 1660

Status: Repealed

Text of statute as originally enacted

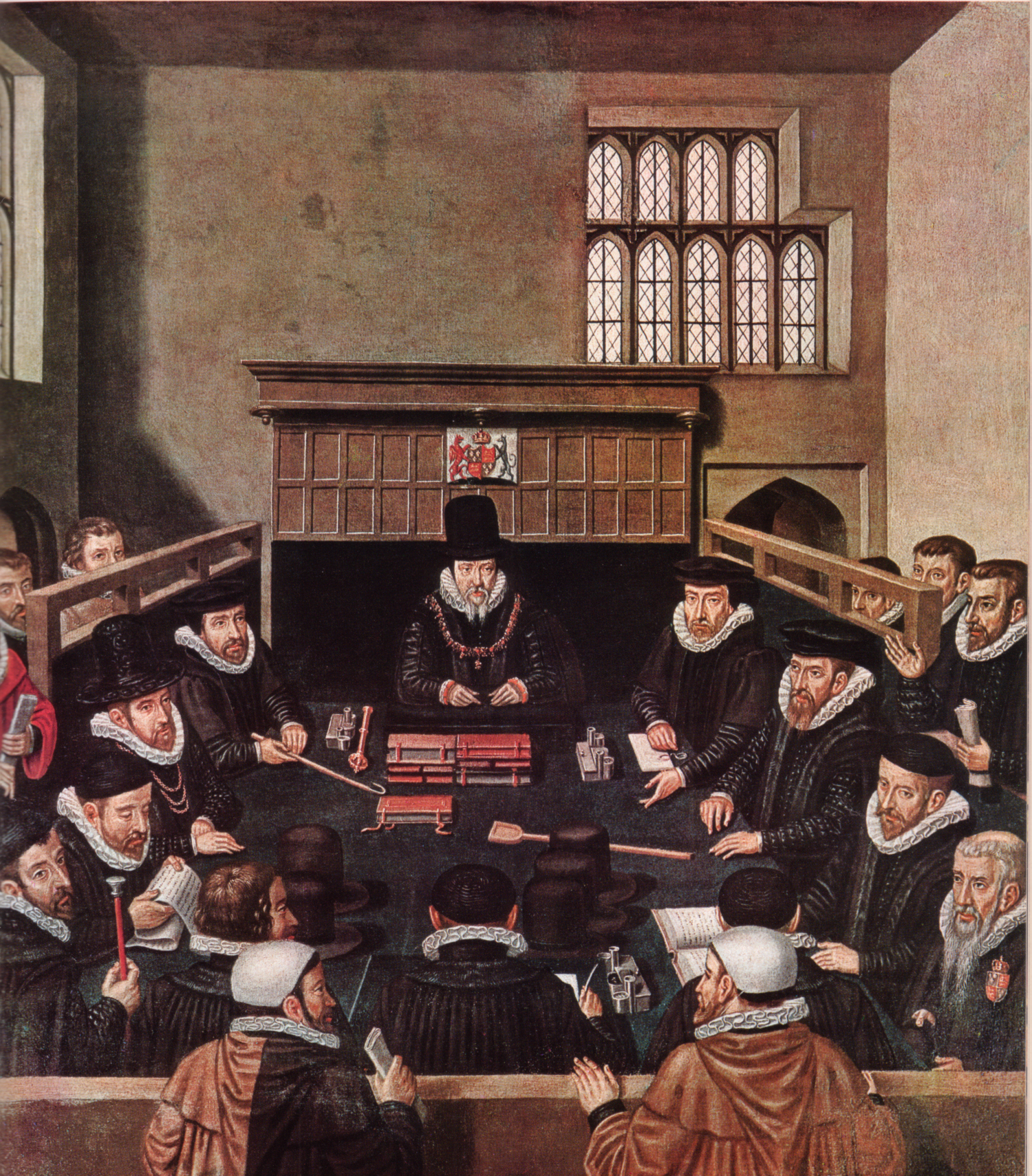
William Cecil presiding over the Court of Wards, c.1585

Wards and Liveries Act 1541
- Act of Parliament
- Parliament of England
- Long title: An Act concerning the Order of Wards and Liveries.
- Citation: 33 Hen. 8. c. 22
- Territorial extent: England and Wales

Dates
- Royal assent: 1 April 1542
- Commencement: 16 January 1542 (Note: Start of session.)
- Expired: 25 April 1660
- Repealed: 25 April 1660
Other legislation
Amends	Wards and Liveries Act 1540
Repealed by	Tenures Abolition Act 1660

Status: Repealed

Text of statute as originally enacted

The Court of Wards and Liveries was a court established during the reign of Henry VIII in England. Its purpose was to administer a system of feudal dues; but as well as the revenue collection, the court was also responsible for wardship and livery issues.

The court was established from 1540 by two acts of Parliament, the Court of Wards Act 1540 (32 Hen. 8. c. 46) and the Wards and Liveries Act 1541 (33 Hen. 8. c. 22).

As Master of the Court, from 1561, William Cecil was responsible for the upbringing of orphaned heirs to peerages and also, until they came of age, for the administration of their estates.

In 1610, King James I attempted to negotiate with Parliament a regular income of £200,000 a year in return for the abolition of the hated Court of Wards. While the negotiations failed, the episode showed Parliament that the royal prerogative could be up for sale.

In February 1646 (New Style), during the English Civil War, the Court of Wards and Liveries lost its principal function, due to the abolition by the Long Parliament of feudal tenure. The court was formally abolished soon after the restoration of the monarchy by the Tenures Abolition Act 1660 (12 Cha. 2. c. 24).

== History ==
Wardship of minor heirs of a tenant in chief was one of the king's ancient "feudal incidents" (amongst escheat, marriage settlement, relief, custody of an idiot, etc.), that is to say a right of royal prerogative dating back to the feudal principle of seigneurial guardianship. King Henry VIII of England prevented his tenants from depriving him of royal revenue by sponsoring the 1535 law called the Statute of Uses.

Such right entitled the king to all the revenues of the deceased's estate, excluding those lands, generally one third of the estate, allocated to his widow as dower, until the heir reached his majority of 21, or 14 if a female. The king generally sold such wardships to the highest bidder or granted them gratis, generally by letters patent to a favoured courtier as a reward for services, which saved cash having to be found from the privy purse. On attainment of his majority at the age of 21, a proof of age inquisition would be held, resulting in a certification witnessed by prominent men from his local area who certified that he had reached the age of 21. Such certificate then formed the basis for the king to issue a writ to the custodian of the land in question to release it to the heir, who then obtained seizin.

An example of such grant made on 20 November 1495 is as follows:

Grant to William Martyn, esquire, and William Twynyho, esquire, of the keeping of the lands late of John Trenchard, tenant in chief, and after the death of Margaret, widow of the said John, of the lands which she holds in dower; with the wardship and marriage of Thomas Trenchard, his son and heir.

== Identification of wardships ==
On the death of every tenant-in-chief the escheator of the county in which he held land was required to hold an inquisition post mortem and report to the Court of Chancery which identified the size and location of the holdings, the rents and services due under feudal land tenure, the name and age of the deceased and the name and age of his heir. A copy was sent to the Exchequer, and after 1540 to the Court of Wards and Liveries.

== Increased exploitation of wardships by Tudors ==
The systems for the exploitation of royal feudal incidents fell into decay by the 15th century, but following the accession of King Henry VII (1485–1509) in 1485, and in order to replenish the royal treasury, a new importance was placed on fully exploiting such rights. Surveyors, commissioners and from 1514 county feodaries were appointed to actively search for and spy out potential royal wardships, and in each county there were established over wards retained by the king a master, receiver-general, auditor and particular receiver. Liberal rewards were paid to anyone providing information allowing the discovery of a new crown ward. Over all was appointed a "Master of the King's Wards", to be held at the king's pleasure, first established in late 1503, to supervise royal wardships and administer the lands and revenues of wards during the period of crown control, and to sell those not to be retained. The revenues were paid to the Treasurer of the Chamber, that is to say the king's private funds, not into the Treasury.

The master originally was required to declare his accounts orally to the king's own person four times a year, which in 1531 was altered to require the rendering of such accounts to general surveyors.

=== List of Masters of Wards ===
(Source: Richardson, 1952, p. 487)

- Sir John Hussey (9 December 1503 – June 1513)
- Sir Thomas Lovell (14 June 1513 – December 1520)
- Sir Richard Weston (24 January 1518 – November 1526)
- Sir Edward Belknap (8 December 1520 – March 1521)
- Sir Thomas Englefield (22 May 1526 – 1534)
- Sir William Paulet (3 November 1526 – 1540)

== Establishment of Court of Wards ==
In 1540 the office of "Master of the King's Wards" was replaced by the Court of Wards, which assumed complete control of wards and the administration of their lands. This was inspired by the successful establishment of the Court of Augmentations in 1536, and it followed a similar organisation. The court had a seal and met in quarterly sessions. The other officials included a surveyor, attorney, receiver-general and two auditors.

== Amalgamation with Office of Liveries ==
The office of "Surveyor of the King's Liveries" was in existence between 1514 and 1542, when the office was joined to the Court of Wards, becoming the "King's Court of Wards and Liveries".

=== List of Surveyors of Liveries ===
(Source: Richardson, 1952, p. 487)

- Sir Thomas Neville (c. 1514–1542)
- Sir Robert Norwich (15 September 1529 – 1535)
- Sir Richard Rich (20 April 1535 – autumn 1536)
- John Hynde (1537–1542)

== List of officers of Court of Ward and Liveries ==
(Source: Richardson, 1952, p. 488)

=== Master of the Wards ===
- Sir William Paulet (26 July 1540–May 1554)
- Sir Francis Eaglefield (1554 – 1558)
- Sir Thomas Parry (c.1558 – c.1561)
- Lord Burghley (1561 – 4 August 1598)
- Robert Cecil (21 May 1599 – 24 May 1612)
- George Carew (died 1612) (1612 – 13 November 1612)
- Walter Cope (c.1553–1614) (November 1612 – 1614)
- Sir William Knollys (1544–1632) (1614 – 1618)
- Lionel Cranfield (1575–1645) (1619 – 1623)
- Sir Robert Naunton (1563–1635) (30 September 1624 – 16 March 1635)
- Francis Cottington (c.1579–1652) (16 March 1635 – May 1641)
- William, Viscount Saye and Sele (1582–1662) (1641 – ?)

=== Surveyor ===
- John Hynde (died 1550) (1542 – 1546)
- Robert Keilway (by 1515–1581) (1546 – 1581)
- Thomas Seckford (1581 – December 1587)
- Richard Kingsmill (c.1528–1600) (1590 – ?1600)
- Cuthbert Pepper (died 1608) (1600 – 1607)
- Sir Roger Wilbraham (1553–1616) (1607 – 31 July 1616)
- Sir Robert Naunton (1563–1635) (1617)
- Sir Humphrey May (January 1618 – April 1618)
- Sir Benjamin Rudyerd (1572–1658) (17 April 1618 – 1647) (last surveyor)

=== Receiver-General ===
- Philip Paris (2 August 1540 – 26 February 1544)
- Richard Lee (26 February 1544 – 30 January 1545)
- John Beaumont (by 1508–1558/64) (30 January 1545 – December 1550)
- George Goring (aft.1522-1594)) (3 July 1584 – 1594)
- Sir William Fleetwood (1551–1616) (1594 – 3 February 1610)
- Sir Miles Fleetwood (died 1641) (3 February 1610 – 1641)
- William Fleetwood (1603–1674) (1641 – 1643) (last receiver)

=== Attorney ===
- Thomas Polsted (1540 – )
- John Sewster (1541 – )
- Richard Goodrich (1546 – )
- Nicholas Bacon (1547 – )
- Robert Nowell (c.1520–1569) (1561 – 1568)
- Richard Onslow (1568 – )
- Thomas Wilbraham (1531–1573) (23 April 1571 – ?1573)
- Richard Kingsmill (c.1528–1600) (1573 – 1589)
- James Morris (1589 – )
- Edward Latymer (June 16 1601 – June 29 1626)
- Sir Thomas Hesketh (1548–1605) (1597 – ?1605)
- Sir Henry Hobart (c.1560–1625) (1605 – ?1606)
- Sir James Ley (c.1552–1629) (November 1608 – 1621)
- Walter Pye (1571–1635) (2 February 1621 – 26 December 1635)
- Henry Calthorpe (23 January 1636 –29 September 1637)
- Sir Rowland Wandesford (29 September 1637 – )

=== Auditor ===
- Sir John Peryent (1544 – 1551) (jointly)
- William Tooke (1507–1588) (1544 – 1588) (jointly to 1551)
- Walter Tooke (1588 – )
- Cuthbert Pepper (died 1608) (1607 – 1608)
- John Tooke (22 March 1610 – 22 May 1634)
- Thomas Tooke (5 June 1624 – 9 June 1634)
- James Tooke (9 June 1634 – 5 February 1638)
- Charles Maynard (22 May 1634 – 5 Feb 1638)
- ?Walter Prichard (1638) ?
- John Heath (1614–1691) (1643 – 1646)

=== Usher ===
- Marmaduke Servant (c.1578-1605) (died 1605)

=== Messenger ===
- Leonard Taylor (1565-c.1595)

=== Clerks ===
- Edward Latymer (1594 – 1602)

== See also ==
- William Paulet, 1st Marquess of Winchester, first Master of the Court

== Sources ==
- Aldrich, Richard (1982). An Introduction to the History of Education. London: Hodder and Stoughton. p. 96.
- Richardson, W. C. (1952). Tudor Chamber Administration 1485–1547. Baton Rouge Louisiana.
- Bell, H.E. (1953), An Introduction to the History and Records of the Court of Wards and Liveries, Cambridge University Press.
- Simon, Joan (1966). Education and Society in Tudor England. Cambridge: Cambridge University Press. p. 344. ISBN 0521064732.
