= History of equity and trusts =

Historical development of Chancery jurisdiction and trusts

The law of trusts was constructed as a part of "Equity", a body of principles that arose in the Courts of Chancery, which sought to correct the strictness of the common law. The trust was an addition to the law of property, in the situation where one person held legal title to property but the courts decided it was fair just or "equitable" that this person be compelled to use it for the benefit of another. This recognised as a split between legal and beneficial ownership: the legal owner was referred to as a "trustee" (because he was "entrusted" with property) and the beneficial owner was the "beneficiary".

== Roman precursors to trusts ==
Roman law had a well-developed concept analogous to the trust called fideicommissa. These were created by will and enabled a testator to leave property to one person who was obliged to hand it over to another. While they were much older they only began to create enforceable legal obligations around the time of the beginning of Roman Empire when Claudius charged the Consuls with enforcing fideicommissa, which were previously seen as merely morally binding. They had the advantage that whereas only the testator's heir could be charged with a legacy, legatees themselves could be charged with fideicommissa. They also allowed those who would otherwise have been ineligible to inherit (like proscribed persons and foreigners) to inherit from the testator.

These testamentary devices however, did not develop into the inter vivos (living) trusts which apply the creator lives and would develop in England in the Middle Ages that created the basis for the modern English trust.

== Medieval origins ==
=== Emergence of the Court of Chancery ===
The origin of the trust has to be traced to medieval England, where a distinction arose between the 'regular "course of the common law" ' and the practices and rulings that the Lord Chancellor gave. This notion of 'regular course' not only derived from Magna Carta, but would parenthetically become the broader idea of 'due process of law', but in its original conception it meant only that English subjects were entitled to be dealt and judged according to the English Common Law and that the King could not create new courts that contradicted or opposed the Common Law as developed in the courts of Exchequer, Common Pleas, and King's Bench.

Despite this, the Kings were accepted to retain the right to administer justice in special cases where common law was 'deficient' and the matter in question did not involve 'life, limb or property'. The way this special grace was administered was through a petition to the King. Most of the petitions (also known as 'bills') received no special redress but in some truly exceptional cases there would be some special treatment or dispensation which according to Sir John Baker, can be seen as 'the beginning of newer jurisdictions'. As the number of these petitions grew, it became common for the King to delegate addressing the petitions to either His Council or to a particular official most commonly, the Lord Chancellor. As it became usual to delegate the petitions to the Lord Chancellor it became common for petitioners to simply address the Lord Chancellor directly and not the King giving rise to the Court of Chancery. This process of petitioning the King also served to create other courts like the Court of Requests.

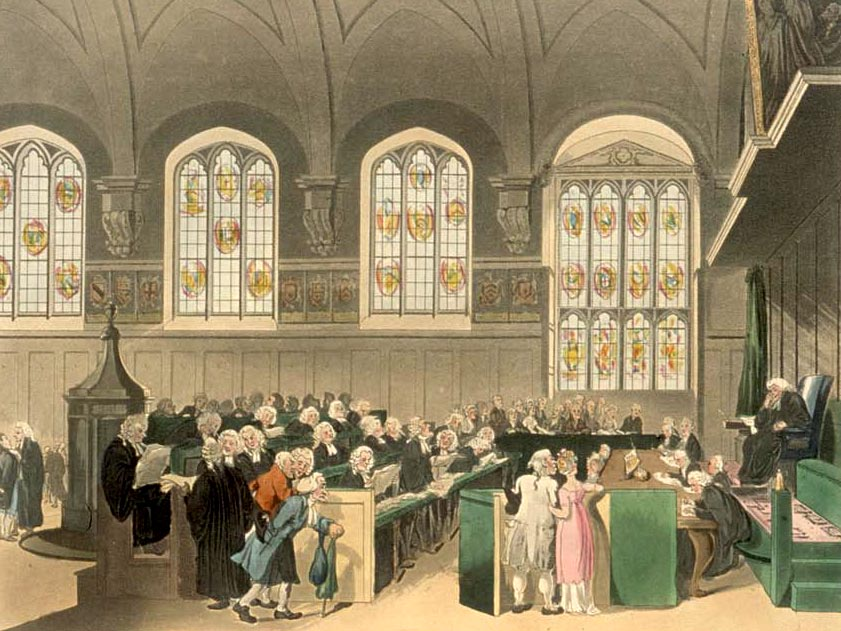
Court of Chancery in the 18th century.

Medieval Lords Chancellor tended to be either senior clerics (Bishops and Archbishops) (Note: While many Medieval Chancellors were not only clerics but trained canon lawyers, their court was never an ecclesiastical court.) or experienced lawyers. Thus, when asked to deal with petitions asking for some special redress from the common law they did so from their own conscience, often drawing wisdom from Biblical or Philosophical conceptions of what was just in a particular case. It is important to remark that originally they were seen as merely addressing particular cases and could neither affect parties not named in the decrees the Chancellor gave nor change the law. These decrees 'enjoined' the parties to act in a particular way, giving rise to Equity's distinctive remedy: the Injunction. While the Common Law almost invariably awarded money damages, Equity was able to force defendants to act a particular way on penalty of being imprisoned for contempt of court.

Before 1400, many of the petitions involved cases where a feudal superior abused their privileged position for which the plaintiff sought redress. Between 1400 and 1600 however, it is possible to detect a shift. The Chancellor still decided the cases solely on his conscience, but recourse to his court ceased being an exceptional matter and started to become more normal. Indeed, by 1579 it had become a busy court that was regularly sending away poor litigants, (Note: Poor litigants largely shifted their business to courts like the aforementioned Court of Requests which provided a fast and cheap way to redress their disputes.) which would have been the staple of its earlier business, in order to address more substantial disputes.

=== Uses of land as direct precursors to trusts ===
==== Early history of the Use ====
According to common law there was only one person who said to have a right to land, which was the person entitled to seisin. However, the Lord Chancellor would hold that somebody was bound by good conscience to hold some land they had the right to ad opus alterius (for the benefit of another). At first, these nascent trusts were intended to be temporary. e.g. when a tenant by copyhold (a kind of tenure where the tenant was obliged to perform manorial duties to his lord who left the original deeds in the manorial roll) wanted to convey his land to another the procedure until 1925 was to surrender the land to the lord. He then held it for the benefit of the transferee until the lord admitted him as his feudal tenant.

This holding of land for the benefit of another was found to be helpful when conveying land to those who were forbidden to own any. In particular, the Franciscans swore an oath of poverty that meant they could not own land directly. Furthermore, as Baker notes, Franciscan friars lacked the corporate personality that monks organised in abbeys and priories allowed them to own property through the abbey or priory. This oath of poverty, as confirmed by the papal bull Quo elongati (1230), did not prevent them from enjoying the benefits of said land like rents and free accommodation. While a statute of 1391 prohibited the creation of uses for the benefit of religious corporations as these violated the several statutes of mortmain that gave the Crown oversight over donations of land to the Church. This was particularly important as the King had the right to charge a fee for issuing a licence that would allow a donor to gift land to the Church.

===== The Chancery's role in enforcing Uses =====
The Common Law, would not take notice of uses one effect of this as Baker notes, is that uses could be utilised to put land outside the reach of creditors. Another effect is that it left those entitled to the benefit of the land (called the cestui que use) without recourse in the Common Law courts. Initially, uses would have been a mere matter of morality. It was only by appointing several notable local people, threatened with the shame of depriving another of their inheritance, that due execution of the use could be guaranteed.

There are some evidences that there may be recourse in the Ecclesiastical courts, as they dealt with breaches of oaths (also called fidei laesio). Furthermore, the Church courts had jurisdiction over wills (which regularly employed uses). Indeed, as Baker notes in 1375, a group of feoffees (i.e. those to whom land was transferred to hold for the benefit of another) were excommunicated for breaching the conditions of the use they were supposed to execute.

Uses were a matter of good conscience, it was the Court of Chancery, however, it was suited to pick up the mantle of enforcing the cestui que use's moral right, creating the modern trust in the process. It is impossible to date the exact time at which the Chancery began enforcing uses, "but it was well established by the 1420s".

The 15th century, not only saw the work of the Chancery come to be characterised by the Use, but it began to give the Use some of the hallmarks of an interest in property. e.g.while it was still purely based on the conscience of the feoffee, where all of the feoffees died, the heir of the last one to die remained bound. Likewise, rules like that of Equity's darling, began to emerge in the 1450s. However, in early 1465, there was something that strongly resembles the modern resulting trust.

== Early modern period ==
=== Henry VIII, fiscal feudalism and the Use ===
==== Wills of Land ====
By 1502, Frowyk CJ remarked that most English land was held subject to a use. The reason for this was that it enabled landowners to circumvent the Common Law's strict rules of succession. Under these rules land was not devisable by will but was instead always inherited by the heir-at-law. Uses, however, allowed for creative solutions e.g. those excluded by the rules, such as younger sons, daughters, illegitimate children could be provided for. Likewise, the provisions for widows could be enlarged and charities could be gifted to as well as debts paid off from land. This was achieved by a dying testator conveying land to feoffees, which could be friends, legal advisers or other local gentry, to the use of executing his will.

Indeed, this practice of conveying to feoffees became so common that not only was it done shortly before death but it could be done long before during the life of the landowner, and the transfer simply to the use of the landowner. This still gave the landowner all the control he needed as the feoffees were obliged to execute his instruction both while alive but also by his will, since this interest under a use came to be seen as devisable legal interest under a will.

Purchasers of land however, often complained that they could be burdened by uses unknown to them. The Chancery would, consider them innocent if they were unaware of the use and had paid for the land, but this still required them to answer to a suit in Chancery, which could be cumbersome and expensive. Despite attempts in the late 15th century to resolve this, (Note: Eg. through a statute of 1484 (1 Ric.3 c 1), feoffees could transfer good title to the land to a purchaser who bought from them so long as the cestui could have done so.) this complaint remained.

Henry VIII

==== Fiscal feudalism ====
Furthermore, the use as a method of evading the feudal law of succession to land threatened the revenue of the Crown. Lords, particularly the Crown, had certain rights over their tenants' land sometimes called 'incidents of tenure'. Some of the most important were wardship and premier seisin. Under these doctrines, the Crown had the right to enjoy the profit of the tenant's land until he was of age (21) and to select a suitable marriage for the ward, something that could involve a profitable transaction for the Crown as it was allowed to sell the right to marry a rich heir. Likewise, under premier seisin, the Crown could claim the profits of an heir's land for a year.

These rights were an important source of income for the cash-short English monarchs. Henry VII and Henry VIII, who often faced increasingly expensive foreign wars, were determined to protect and increase their revenue from these rights as lord. Some scholars have called this phenomenon, "Fiscal Feudalism". In 1529, Henry VIII proposed a bill that would restore feudal incidents where land had been conveyed to the use of executing the landowners will but only at one third of the levels that the Common Law demanded. The House of Commons rejected the bill in 1531, at which point the King threatened that if they would not accept his proposal he would seek to enforce his feudal rights as far as the Law allowed. Within the circles of the King's legal advisers the view came to prevail that Uses of land were deceitful and thus were actually contrary to conscience to enforce. To this end, in 1532, Thomas Audley was made Lord Keeper of the Great Seal (Note: The Lord Keeper had the same rights and jurisdiction as the Chancellor but was seen as a lesser office. Sometimes they were appointed in between Chancellors and sometimes as permanent officers.) and Lord Chancellor the following year. Furthermore, the King's Secretary Thomas Cromwell was appointed Master of the Rolls in 1534.

==== Lord Dacre's case and the Statutes ====
An opportunity to restore the full force of the English feudal law of inheritance (and thus the King's incidents) came when Lord Dacre died in 1533. He had left a will of land through a Use and had thus deprived the King of his rights to wardship and premier seisin. Thus, when the case came up in 1535 Audley and Cromwell summoned the common law judges to discuss the case. After initially dividing evenly on the question, Henry VIII "coaxed or coerced" them to unanimously agree with his (extreme) position that uses of land intended to allow for wills of land were fraudulent and thus should not be enforced by the Chancery, or indeed the Common Law. This had the effect of invalidating any and all wills of land. Furthermore, however, this decision threw into question all previous wills of land that had been common to make for over a century.

This decision and the confusion it caused made Commons agree to a new version of the bill the King had presented in 1529. This became the Statute of Uses (1536). While a clause in the statute ratified the validity of all wills of land prior to Lord Dacre's case, the main provision of the statute was to abolish absolutely the power to bequeath land by will. It did this via a legal fiction called 'executing the Use'. The statute could not simply abolish uses because that would have given an enormous windfall to all the lawyers or friends who held the land for the beneficial landowners. Instead the statute mandated that where a person held land for the benefit or to the use of another person, this other person was to be held, for all intents and purposes, as if they held (or were seised of) the land directly. This meant the intended cestui que use would always die owning the land, thus owing feudal incidents to the King (or a mense lord).

The statute was very successful in restoring the Crown's feudal revenues and its draftsmanship was later much admired. It was profoundly unpopular however. In particular, it contributed to the 1536 Pilgrimage of Grace. This was an uprising that started in Yorkshire and spread across the North which sought to reverse some of Henry VIII's most controversial policies, such as the Dissolution of the monasteries, the break with the Roman Catholic Church, but also the Statute of Uses. While the Pilgrimage was itself unsuccessful, the idea that a loophole or work around the prohibition of wills of land could be found began to take hold in legal circles. By 1540 it became clear that lawyers were close to finding a way to evade the Statute of uses and indeed some lawyers were even imprisoned in the Tower of London for advising Sir John Shelton on possible ways to achieve this. This fear of losing the revenues resulted in the King offering the House of Commons a compromise similar to the one he had offered in 1529. A bill was introduced and this time it would pass successfully through the House of Commons to become the Statute of Wills (1540). This piece of legislation gave landowners the explicit right to make common law wills over a maximum of two thirds of their land, forcing them to let their heirs-at-law inherit one third, thus preserving one-third of the feudal incidents.

This compromise was successful in preserving a substantial amount of revenue through the late Tudor and early Stuart period. (Note: In the time of Elizabeth I it was around £14,000, roughly equivalent to the interest on the Queen's foreign debt.) Fiscal feudalism would die, however, with the abolition of the Monarchy in the Commonwealth period, when feudal incidents were abolished, a measure that was confirmed during the Restoration in 1660.

==== History of the Use post-Statute of Uses ====
===== Uses as conveyancing =====
Before the Statute of Uses, conveyancing required a formal ceremony to deliver seisin to the transferee of land. While the requirement of the ceremony had relaxed over the centuries, and indeed the transferor's feudal lord had not been involved since the statute Quia Emptores of 1290, there remained a requirement to be actually present on the land and for a symbolic object (like a piece of earth or a key) to pass between the parties doing the transfer. The Chancery had long implied a Use where a vendor contracted to sell land to a purchaser so that the former held the land to the use of the latter. This was analogous to the modern Vendor-Purchaser Constructive Trust.

The 1536 statute meant, that these Uses were executed immediately upon the contract of sale being agreed thus passing title to the that before certain critical things could be done. This included investigating whether the seller actually had good title to the land but also conveyed title before the purchase price was handed over. While this was thought to be inconvenient, the advantage of being able, for the first time, to convey land privately and at a distance was too large. Thus, Parliament hastily passed in 1536 an emergency piece of legislation, the Statute of Enrolments. This provided that where a Use was created by a bargain, it was not to be executed unless it was made by deed and until it was enrolled at one of the Common Law Courts.

===== Active Uses and the Use upon a Use: Birth of the Modern Trust =====
While the Statute of Uses ended the practice of creating uses as a means of creating valid wills of land, the Statute was not held to execute all Uses. This would serve as the birthplace of the trust. Some Uses had active duties the feoffees had to fulfill, such as managing an estate or collecting and distributing income, or paying debts. These 'active' Uses could not be executed automatically by the Statute and were thus excluded. Amongst these charitable uses were able to continue undisturbed directly becoming what are now called charitable trusts when the nomenclature changed. Another category of Use that was excluded from the application of the Statute of 1536 was the "double Use" or the 'Use upon a Use'. There were two main variations of this type of Use. Under the first, land owned by A would be conveyed to X 'to the use of X himself to the use of B.' Alternatively, A could convey to X 'to the use of Y to the use of B'. Under either of these arrangements the Statute would execute the initial Use (i.e. either X or Y would immediately stand seised to the use of B), but the second Use was not, allowing therefore for the creation of Uses of land so long as an intermediary was inserted before the intended beneficiary. The first reported case where this arrangement was enforced in Chancery was Bertie v Herenden. In that case the dowager Duchess of Suffolk had fled to Poland to avoid persecution as a Protestant during the reign of Mary and had conveyed land to a lawyer 'to his use' but secretly on trust to be reconveyed to her.

These double Uses became commonplace in the first few decades after the Statue of Wills and by the 18th century Baker notes it had become common form to convey thus:

to X and his heirs unto and to the use of Y and his heirs, in trust nevertheless of Z.

This type of conveyance to create a trust would indeed be the most usual until 1926 when the Statute of Uses was finally abolished by the Law of Property Act 1925. The change of nomenclature from Use to Trust was not immediate and is not clear cut, but rather it was a gradual process. Contemporary scholars like Neil Jones, generally draw a line between uses/trusts created before the Statute of Uses, calling them Uses, and those created after, calling them Trusts, following the common words of conveyance cited above. Thus, the 'pedigree' of the modern trust can be directly linked to those post-Statute Uses.

=== Birth of modern equity ===
==== Supremacy over the Common Law ====
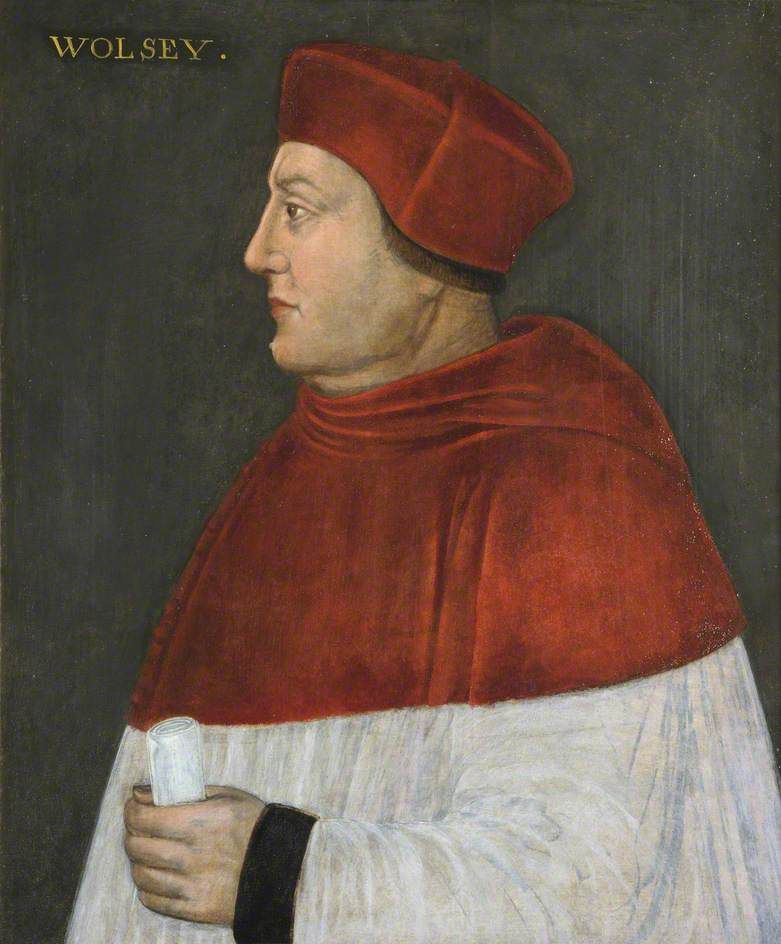
Cardinal Wolseley, Lord Chancellor (1515–29)

The Tudor period saw a change in nomenclature such that the justice being administered by the Chancellor began to be known as 'Equity'. Around this time the jurisdiction also came under increased scrutiny due to a perception that deciding cases according to the conscience of one man was arbitrary and contrary to the Common Law. These concerns reached their zenith during the Chancellorship of Cardinal Wolseley (1515–29). While his successor as Chancellor, Thomas More, did much to close the growing enmity between the Chancellor and the Common Law judges, by the mid-1550s the practice of Court of Chancery had become both too distinct from the law and too embedded to disappear or merge with the Common Law.

===== Background =====
The reliance on the conscience of the Chancellor as the way cases were decided made the relationship between the Equity and the Common Law susceptible to the personal relationship between the Chancellor and the Common Law Judges. For example, in 1482 a Chief Justice of the King's Bench threatened to contradict an injunction issued the Chancellor by releasing, through a writ of habeas corpus, anybody the Chancellor imprisoned pursuant to his injunction. Nonetheless, relations were generally harmonious. By the Tudor period, frictions were beginning to increase. There was a growing sense in Common Law legal circles that 'conscience' was an unsatisfactory way to resolve cases. e.g., the author of The Doctor and Student, an early 16th century legal treatise structured as a dialogue between a civilian Doctor of Law and a student of the common law, heavily criticised the interference of the Chancellor in the justice being imparted in the Common Law courts. It particularly condemned 'conscience' as a deficient and fickle standard by which to administer justice.

Furthermore, as mentioned above, some Tudor Chancellors like Wolseley had become increasingly antagonistic and dismissive towards the Common Law.

===== Tipping point: The Earl of Oxford's case =====
Tension between the two jurisdictions would reach an extreme, during the Chancellorship of Lord Ellesmere, who was appointed as Chancellor in 1596. Despite the fact that Ellesmere had been an 'able common lawyer by training', he, alongside his Master of the Rolls, the civilian, Sir Julius Caesar (appointed in 1614), began to increasingly antagonise the Common Law judges. They began to allow cases to be heard in Chancery after judgment had been given by a Common Law judge.

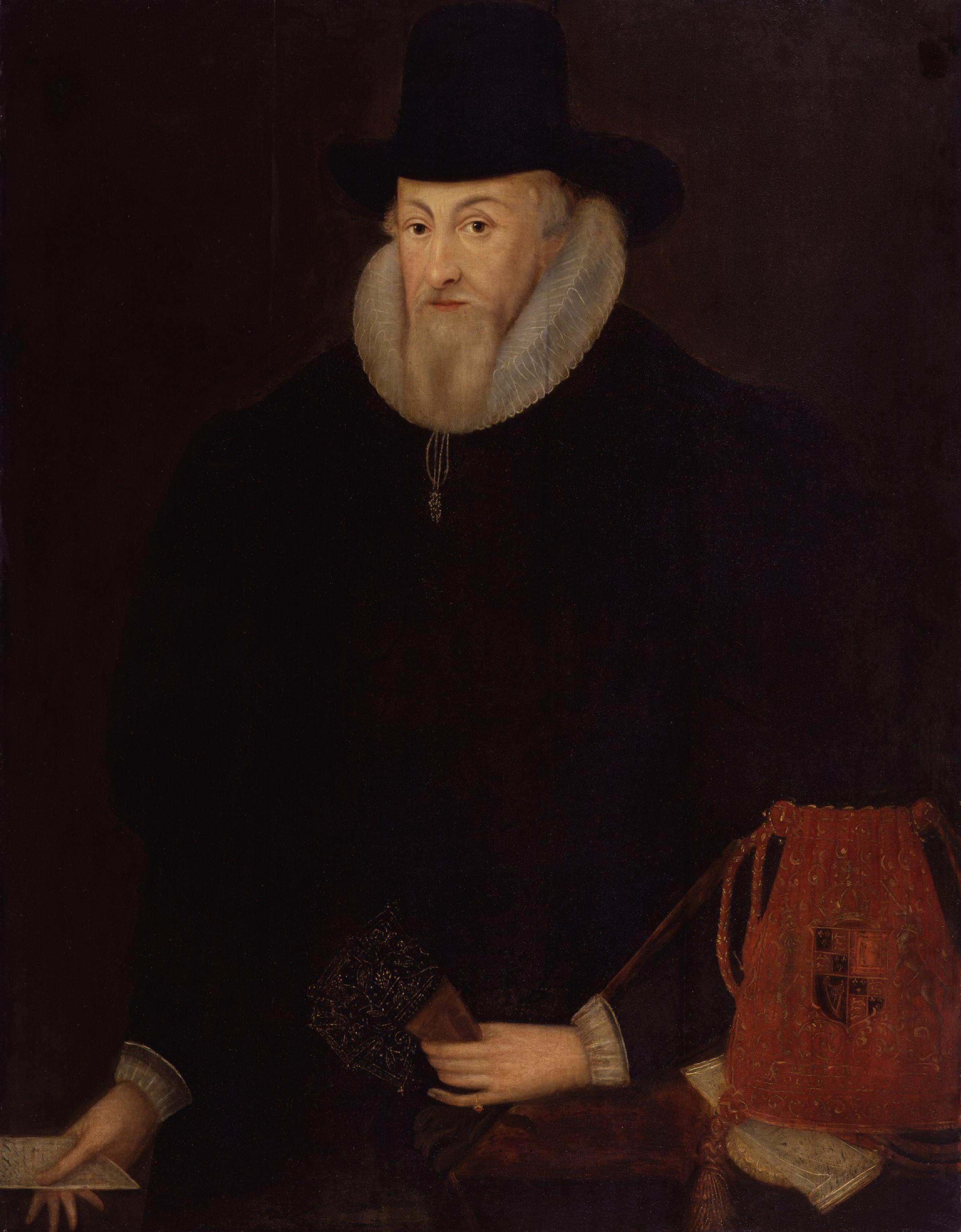
Lord Ellesmere, Lord Chancellor (1596–1617)

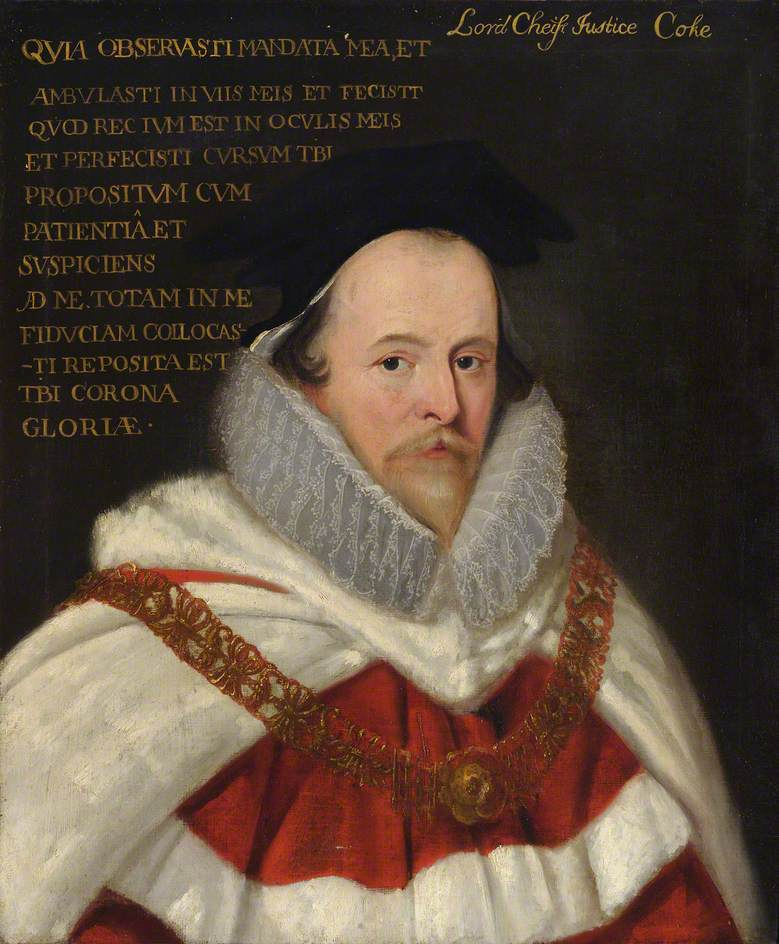
Sir Edward Coke, Chief Justice of the King's Bench (1613–16)

This practice of reopening cases was plainly illegal. It was contrary to both a 1597 decision of all the Common Law judges sitting in Exchequer Chamber and to a statute from the reign of Henry IV. Thus, Edward Coke, then Chief Justice of the King's Bench (appointed 1613), began releasing, through writs of habeas corpus those that Ellesmere had committed to prison for contempt of Court for enforcing their common law judgements. In Coke's orthodox view, plaintiffs should seek equitable remedies only before judgement was entered at common law.

The matter came to a head with the Earl of Oxford's case. The Robert de Vere, 19th Earl, had sued the college in Chancery claiming freehold title to some lands. The same title had already been determined by a Common Law court in a previous case (Note: Warren v Smith) and so the Master of Magdalene College, Cambridge, a man called Gooch, was imprisoned by the Lord Chancellor for refusing to answer to the proceedings in Chancery. Gooch thus brought a habeas corpus. Coke, controversially, was of the view that "the court of King's Bench is the school of the law and ought to correct the abuses of other courts". This included the Court of Chancery and sought to place his court above that of Ellesmere. This was the end of the Earl's case. Nonetheless, the two jurisdictions, Chancery and Common Law were now in direct conflict, as they ordered the imprisonment and subsequent release of defendants for following each other's orders.

The matter was resolved when two plaintiffs brought prosecutions against Chancery officials and lawyers (including some close to Ellesmere) for the crime of praemunire. (Note: Ie. impeaching the judgements of the King's judges.) This was something that Coke had encouraged the prisoners to do. The jury that heard the case dismissed it but not before Coke made them go back to reconsider their verdict three times and when they insisted he told the sheriff (in charge of summoning juries) to bring a "wiser jury" next time. This outraged Ellesmere, who complained to the King, James I. The relationship between Coke and James I was already strained. Thus, when prompted by Francis Bacon, the King was willing, sitting in Court of Star Chamber, to rule that Coke had made a mistake and that, since the Lord Chancellor represented the King and the King was above reproach by his judges, the jurisdiction of the Chancery was above and unimpeachable by that of the Common Law judges. Coke would be dismissed as Chief Justice, and indeed as a judge altogether a few months afterwards for a separate but similar dispute about whether the King was above the law.

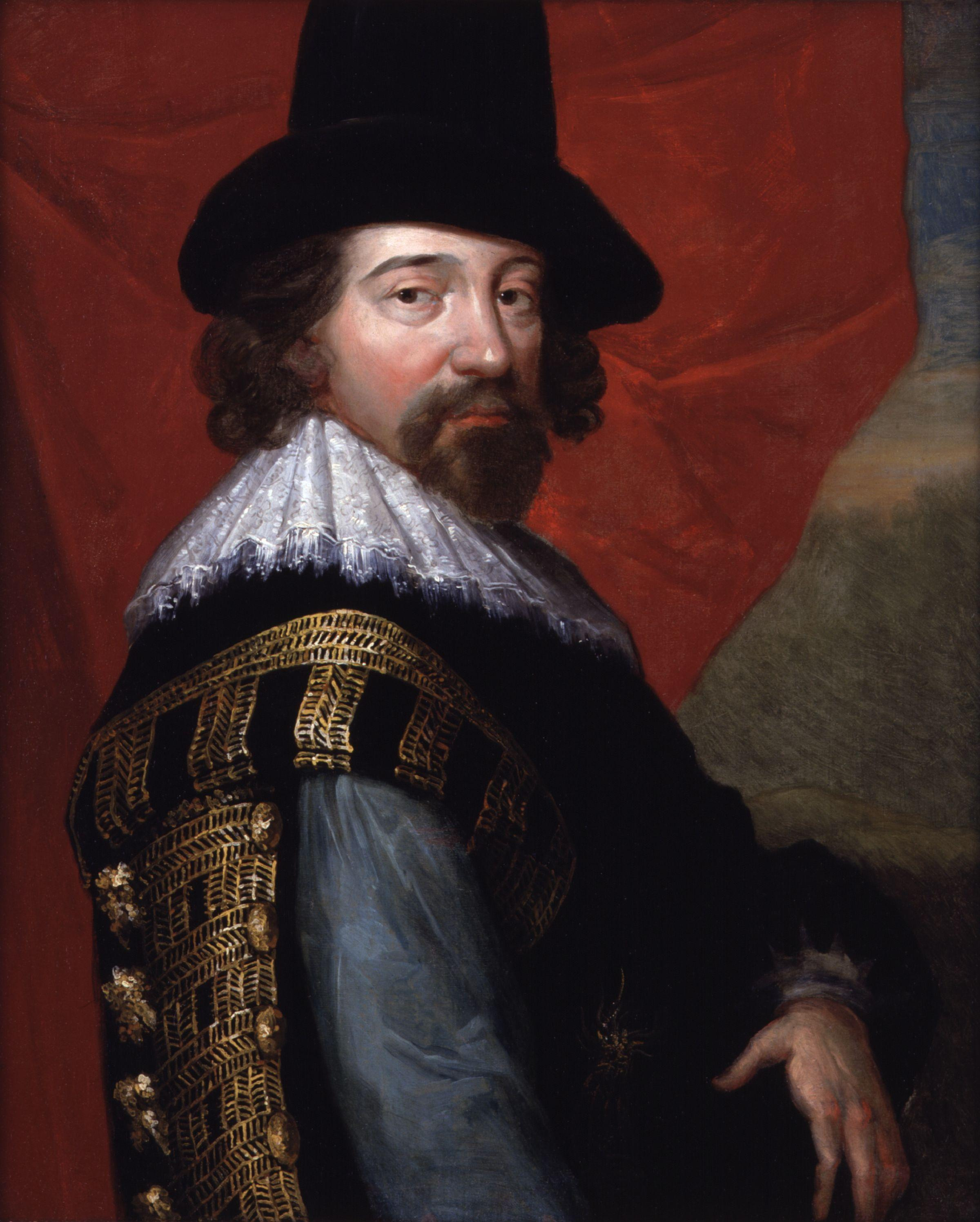
Francis Bacon, Lord Chancellor (1617–1621)

Ellesmere's death in 1617 and his replacement with Francis Bacon sought to foster better relations with the Common Law judges, preventing the open hostility from arising again. Thus even if the King James's ruling of 1616 would come to be seen as illegal, the supremacy of Equity would eventually prevail when the different jurisdictions were amalgamated in the 19th Century into what today is are Senior Courts of England and Wales.

==== Shift to Equity by rule ====
Equity is a roguish thing: for law we have a measure, know what to trust to; equity is according to the conscience of him that is Chancellor, and as that is larger or narrower, so is equity. ‘Tis all one, as if they should make his foot the standard for the measure we call a Chancellor's foot; what an uncertain measure would this be! One Chancellor has a long foot, another a short foot, a third an indifferent foot; ‘tis the same thing in the Chancellor's conscience.

— John Selden, John Selden's Table Talk

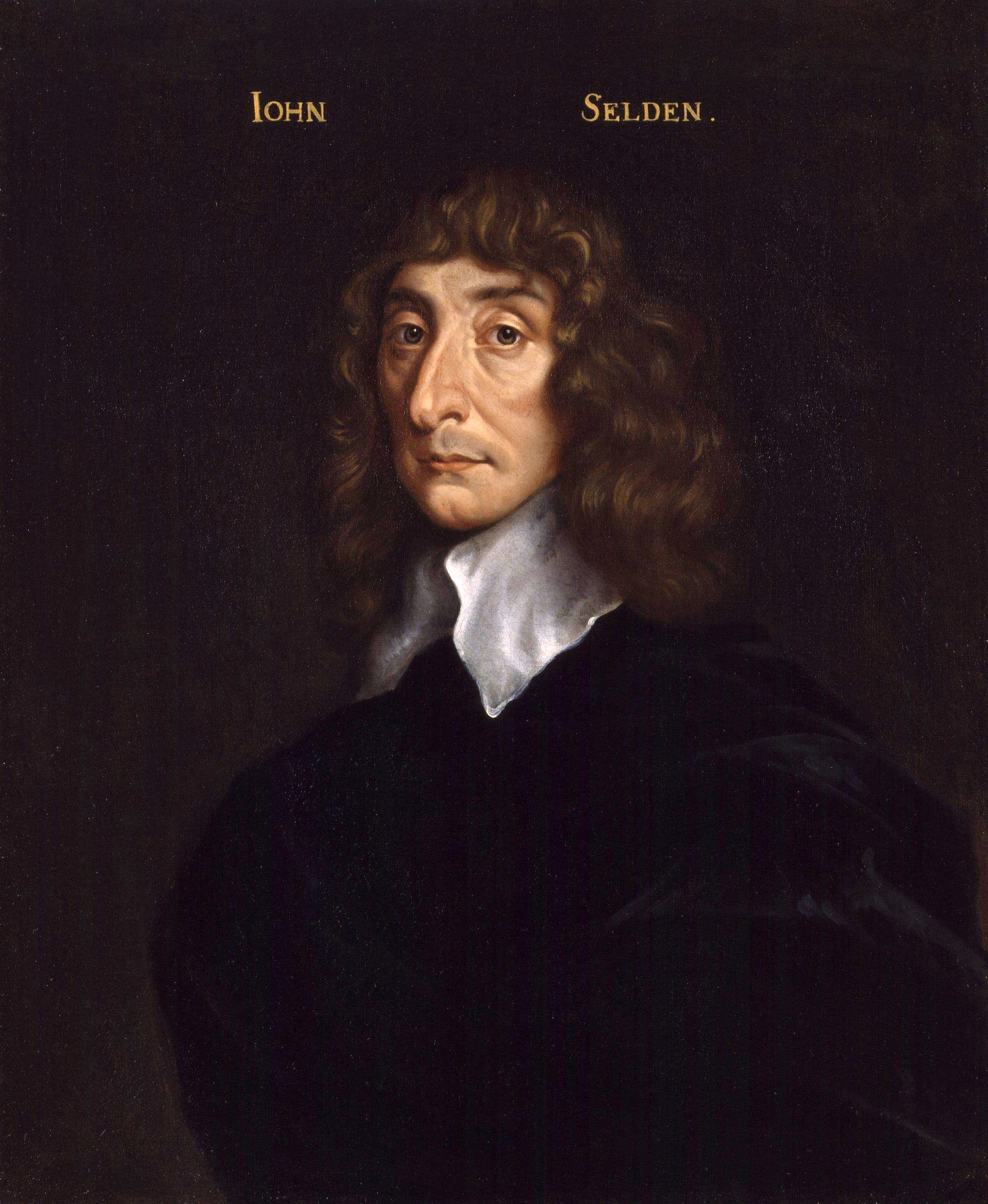
John Selden, 17th century jurist and polymath

The early modern period and the 17th century in particular, was critical in the shifting from a system based purely on the Chancellor's conscience to one based on predicable (if perhaps sometimes flexible) rules as Equity is today. Indeed, the idea of the Chancellor's conscience being the sole deciding factor provoked the jurist John Selden to make the famous comment above, which is now commonly cited in legal circles as "The Chancellor's foot". The criticism predated Selden, it is evident in the treatise Doctor and Student of the previous century. This intellectual pressure began to slowly harden Equity from purely based on the conscience of one man and to start to resemble a system of rules by the start of the 17th century18

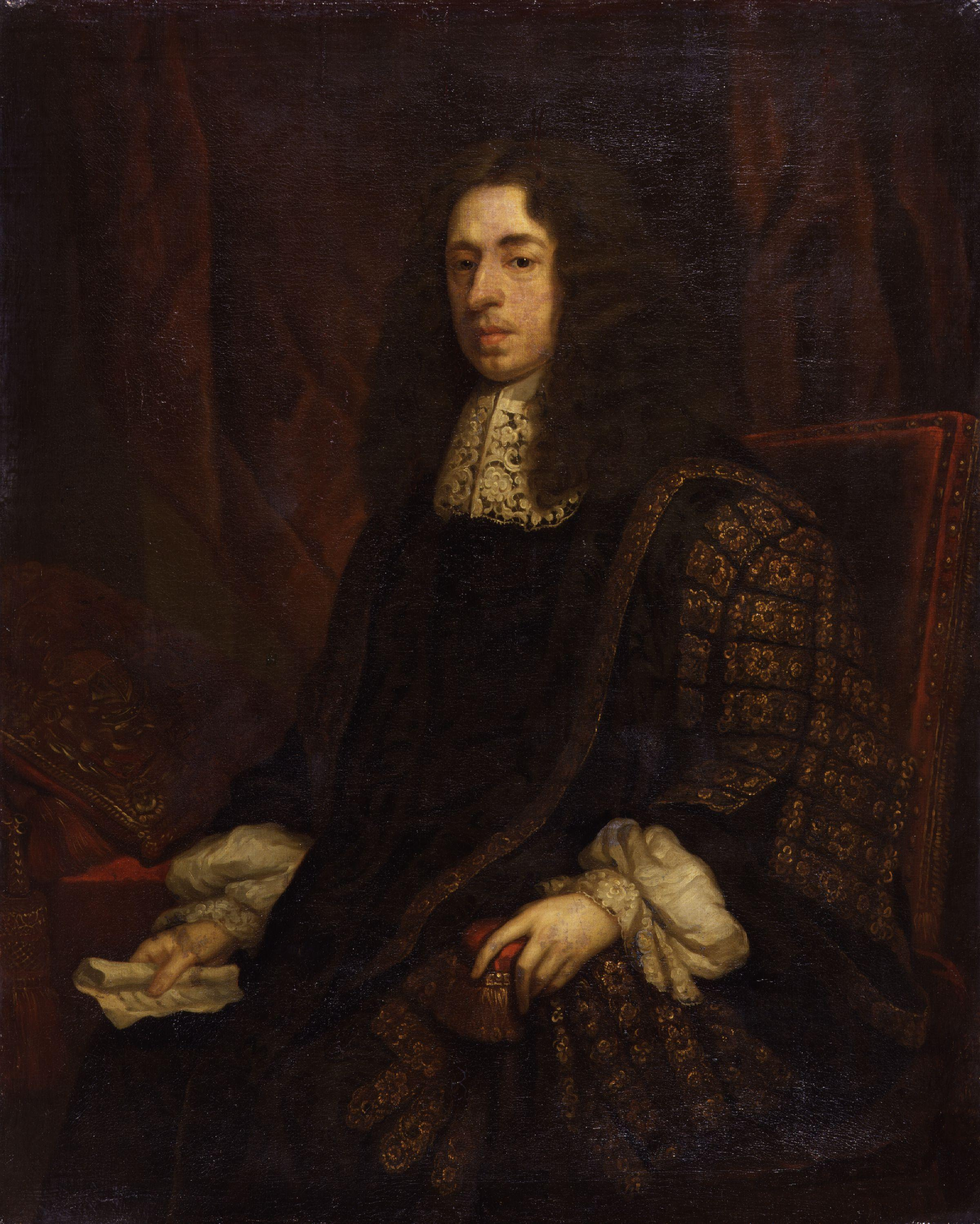
Heneage Finch, 1st Earl of Nottingham, Lord Chancellor (1675–1682).

Baker has also identified the sheer volume of work that the Chancery was increasingly asked to undertake as a factor that contributed to this process of 'hardening'. As the Chancellors came to be "faced with thousands of petitions they could not help but develop routine attitudes to commonly recurring cases." Nonetheless, these 'routine attitude' built on an earlier tradition of a procedural 'course' that developed and that over the 16th century came to encompass doctrinal matters.

This growing 'course' became increasingly inflexible. In 1617, the Lord Chancellor, Francis Bacon appointed an official reporter for the first time. This reporter sat at his feet and took notes of his judgements, allowing them to be easily and comprehensively cited. By the second half, of the century cases in the Chancery were being cited in argument regularly. While this was not universally accepted, the use of precedent in the Chancery was increasingly accepted and expected. Chancellors also reacted to this development by giving more detailed reasons for their decisions more and more often. This allowed cases that were alike to be treated alike. This process culminated with Lord Nottingham's famous statement that he could not decide cases according to his own private conscience, but that "the conscience by which I must proceed is merely civilis et politica and tied to certain measures." Thus, Equity "hardened into a kind of law" such that large areas of its jurisdiction, like the law relating to mortgages were clearly regulated by rules as certain as those provided by the Common Law.

=== Early reforms: Commonwealth and Restoration ===
By the late 17th century, it had become an ever more widely held view that equitable rules and the law of trusts varied unpredictably, as the jurist John Selden remarked, according to the size of the "Chancellor's foot". Over the 18th century English property law, and trusts with it, mostly came to a standstill in legislation, but the Court of Chancery continued to develop equitable principles notably under Lord Nottingham (from 1673–1682), Lord King (1725–1733), Lord Hardwicke (1737–1756), and Lord Henley (1757–1766). In 1765, the first Professor of English law, William Blackstone wrote in his Commentaries on the Laws of England that equity should not be seen as a distinct body of rules, separate from the other laws of England. For example, although it was "said that a court of equity determines according to the spirit of the rule and not according to the strictness of the letter," wrote Blackstone, "so also does a court of law" and the result was that each system of courts was attempting to reach "the same principles of justice and positive law".

Blackstone's influence reached far. Chancellors became more concerned to standardise and harmonise equitable principles. At the start of the 19th century in Gee v Pritchard, referring to John Selden's quip, Lord Eldon (1801–1827) said 'Nothing would inflict upon me greater pain in quitting this place than the recollection that I had done anything to justify the reproach that the equity of this court varies like the Chancellor's foot.' The Court of Chancery was meant to have mitigated the strictness of the common law of property, but instead came to be seen as cumbersome and arcane. This was partly because until 1813, there was only the Lord Chancellor and the Master of the Rolls working as judges. Work was slow. In 1813, a Vice-Chancellor was appointed, in 1841 two more, and in 1851 two Lord Justices of Appeal in Chancery (making seven). This did not, however, save it from public ridicule. In particular, Charles Dickens (1812–1870), who himself worked as a clerk near Chancery Lane, wrote Bleak House in 1853, depicting a fictional case of Jarndyce v Jarndyce, a Chancery matter about wills that nobody understood and dragged on for years and years.

==== Corruption and inefficiency ====
Part of the background to and causes of the English Civil War was the perceived sense that the King was arbitrary and was ruling despotically. This criticism sometimes arose from the behaviour of his courts. The most notable example was that of the Court of Star Chamber, which passed from being a popular court, known for its efficient justice, to be seen as a tool of repression. As has been seen, many similar criticisms were made of the Court of Chancery, despite the fact that its conscience jurisdiction was hardening into Equity. There was a further complaint the Chancery was becoming corrupt and inefficient. It is certain that the Court had a terrible backlog. In the early part of the 17th century, its backlog was estimated to be between 16,000 and 35,000 cases, with Chancellor making around 2,000 orders per year. This meant it was common for litigant to have to make 'gifts' to officials in order for their cases to proceed speedily through the courts. These corrupt practices became so common that the officials came to see them as customary fees which they were entitled to collect.

The very procedure of the Chancery further encouraged waste, inefficiency and corruption. The Master of the Rolls could only sit when the Chancellor was absent, meaning he often could only sit in the evenings and his decisions were always subject to review by the Chancellor, which encouraged unnecessary appeals by litigants hoping for a different result to any decision the Master might make. This made the progress of cases proudly slow and confusing as orders made the Master were often reviewed and changed by the Chancellor, bogging the cases down and increasing costs astronomically. Likewise, Chancellors insisted on having all the facts ascertained before reaching any conclusion, however trivial, as at this time their decisions were final. This meant cases would have to adjourn often whenever a new fact arose so that depositions could be taken. When the case was heard again, much time had to be wasted in repeating the arguments that had already been made. Likewise, since Chancery officials were not paid a salary but rather made their living from fees, there was no incentive to process cases efficiently. E.g. the clerks in charge of making copies of proceedings came to enjoy an arrangement were litigants were forced to pay them to make a certain minimum number of copies of all cases papers, even if the litigants did not want some of these copies. Likewise, since they were paid by the page their handwriting and margins grew so large that, what would have normally taken six pages was written in forty pages' worth.

Oliver Cromwell, Lord Protector (1653–58).

These abuses and complaints meant that when Oliver Cromwell came to power during the Commonwealth, the jurisdiction and practice of the Chancery was soon reviewed.

==== Republican reforms ====
Instead of one Lord Chancellor, Cromwell and the House of Commons appointed several Commissioners of the Great Seal of England and tasked them with reforming the court. However, when the House of Commons took up law reform in 1650, they proposed no changes in the Chancery. It has been suggested that a possible reason for this was the large and power lobby that was formed by Chancery officeholders. In any event, and after several pamphlets criticising the Court had circulated, reforms were proposed in a bill that would have seen the process become more efficient and direct with the creation of a Chief Clerk to handle most of the procedure and with heavy penalties for refusing to answer or appear in court (a novelty). The bill never became law as Parliament delegated its authority on Cromwell in 1654.

Cromwell would issue orders for some of the reforms to be adopted, but the Commissioners refused to heed his orders. Cromwell's orders preserved the Chief Clerk and would have appointed six masters (judges) to sit daily until all cases before the court had been dealt with, with any disagreement between them to be resolved by the chief master. The orders further demanded that all cases be heard in the order in which they were filed and on the day appointed for the hearing, even if that would have meant the Court had to sit in the evenings; though the Masters were allowed to not sit on Saturday afternoons. The Commissioners would still persist in their opposition to the reforms. Despite the fact that Parliament, in the later years of the Commonwealth, would once again consider how to best reform the Chancery, the Monarchy and thus the old officials and most of their practices were restored before they could settle on a satisfactory scheme.

==== The Stuart Restoration ====
The restoration of the Stuart monarchy mean there would be no wholesale reform of the Court of Chancery. Nonetheless, it was recognised that some changes would be necessary and desirable. Lord Clarendon, who was appointed as Lord Chancellor upon Charles II coming to the throne, promulgated a new code of orders for the Court which built on the Cromwellian code. E.g., Clarendon's code ordered that a master's ruling should not be questioned unless the appellant paid forty shillings (two pounds), (Note: Equivalent to £309.97 in August 2022, according to the Bank of England's inflation calculator) which served to stem the tide of appeals against orders. While the driving force behind Clarendon's reforms was to protect the interests of officeholders, there was some initial success at improving the efficiency of the court.

== 18th and 19th century developments ==
=== The Court becomes a victim of its own success ===
==== Increasing backlog ====
Despite Clarendon's reforms, over the 18th and 19th centuries, however, the Court of Chancery would again see its workload and backlog reach astronomic proportions. Part of the cause for this was the unrelenting increase in the court's business. In turn this was caused by the explosion the use of trusts saw over the 18th century.

Partly as a reaction to the increased amount of work, the House of Lords claimed an appellate jurisdiction from the Court of Chancery. This was controversial, with the House of Commons during The Long Parliament

=== Emergence of US Anti-trust law ===
"Antitrust law" emerged in the 19th century when industries created monopolistic trusts by entrusting their shares to a board of trustees in exchange for shares of equal value with dividend rights; these boards could then enforce a monopoly. However, trusts were used in this case because a corporation could not own other companies' stock and thereby become a holding company without a "special act of the legislature". Holding companies were used after the restriction on owning other companies' shares was lifted.

- Judicature Act 1873 s 11, ‘equity shall prevail’.
- Indian Trusts Act 1882
- Settled Land Acts 1882–1925

== Modern trusts ==
- In Federal Commerce & Navigation Co Ltd v Molena Alpha Inc, The Nanfri [1978] 1 QB 927, Lord Denning MR stated
  During that time the streams of common law and equity have flown together and combined so as to be indistinguishable the one from the other. We have no longer to ask ourselves: what would the courts of common law or the courts of equity have done before the Judicature Act? We have to ask ourselves: what should we do now so as to ensure fair dealing between the parties?
- Welfare state and retirement
- UK company law and UK insolvency law
- Offshore tax haven and tax avoidance
- Hague Convention on the Law Applicable to Trusts and on their Recognition (1985)
- Principles of European Trust Law (1999)

== See also ==
- English trusts law
- English land law
