= Use (law) =

Use, as a term in the property law of common law countries, amounts to a recognition of the duty of a person to whom property has been conveyed for certain purposes, to carry out those purposes. In this context "use" is equivalent to "benefit".

Uses were equitable or beneficial interests in land. In early law a property owner could not dispose of his estate by will nor could religious houses acquire it. As a method of avoiding certain common law rules, the practice arose of making feoffments to the use of, or upon trust for, persons other than those to whom the seisin or legal possession was delivered, to which the equitable jurisdiction of the chancellor gave effect. The Statute of Uses was passed in 1536 in an attempt to remedy the abuses which it was said were occasioned by this evasion of the law. However, the Statute failed to accomplish its purpose.

== Development of the use ==
Historian A. L. Brown summarises the use as a "where one or more persons hold land to the 'use' of another". One reason for the creation of uses was a desire to avoid the strictness of certain rules of the common law, which considered seisin to be all-important. Although the common law recognised a use in chattels from an early period, it was clear by the end of the 14th century that land law had no room for this notion. Uses, nonetheless, satisfied contemporary needs in 15th century England. Their first application in relation to land was to provide land to Franciscan friars, who were pledged to vows of poverty and could not own land. Instead, a proprietor could enfeoff (grant) land to a proxy tenant for the friars' use as cestuis que (intended beneficiaries). The law recognised the proxy as the landholder, while the friars used the land as his guests.

Uses served various purposes, including:

- Substitute of wills: Before the Statute of Wills 1540, a tenant in fee simple could not devise the interest in the land by a will at common law. Upon his death the land devolved upon his eldest son or, if he died without leaving an heir, the land would escheat (revert) to his overlord. The use could avoid these results by allowing the tenant to convey his land to a friend, on the understanding that the friend would permit the grantor, and, after the grantor's death, the grantor's designated cestuis que to have the full benefit and enjoyment of the land.
- Avoidance of feudal burdens: By the device of a use, the tenant could avoid dues upon his death, since he was not seised of the land at his death.
- Providing for grantor's wife: Since man and wife were considered to be one person at common law, a man could not convey land to his wife. This difficulty was overcome if the land was conveyed to a feoffee to uses to the use of the grantor's wife.
- Avoidance of the Statutes of Mortmain: The statutes prohibited the conveyance of land to religious bodies. They were avoided by conveyance to a feoffee to uses to the use of a religious order.

The rapid development of the use was probably one of the consequences of the Black Death, during which many landowning nobility died, leaving their realty to their widows and minor orphans.

== Enforcement of uses ==
The Court of Chancery eventually assumed the task of enforcing uses. Later, it decided that not only was the conscience of the feoffee to uses bound by the use, but also the conscience of his heir. Thus, on the death of the feoffee to uses the use could be enforced against the feoffee's heir to whom the legal fee simple estate had descended.

The idea of a tie in conscience was gradually extended, and with it the sphere of enforceability of the use. The modern position was reached by the beginning of the sixteenth century: The use could be enforced against anyone in the world acquiring an interest in the land other than a bona fide purchaser of the legal estate for value without notice of the use. In a conveyance "to A and his heirs to the use of B and his heirs", the common law took cognisance only of A and went no further. But if A attempted to act inconsistently with the dictates of his conscience, the Court of Chancery would enforce the use against him.

From this time, two different kinds of interests in the land could exist side by side, a fragmentation between legal and beneficial.

== The Statute of Uses ==
From early on, legislation interfered with uses where they were employed for purposes that were regarded as improper. During the 14th and 15th centuries, legislation was passed which was designed to prevent uses being created so as to defraud creditors.

As the lord at the top of the feudal pyramid, the King suffered most from the employment of uses and evasion of tenurial incidents. The Statute of Uses (1536) was the culmination of various attempts by Henry VIII to solve the problem. The statute operated to execute the use so that the interest of the cestui que use, which was previously an equitable interest, was converted into a legal interest.

However, the Statute failed to accomplish its purpose, but the modern law of trusts arose out of this failure of the Statute of Uses. The Statute of Uses is also the basis of modern conveyancing.

== See also ==
- Conveyancing
- Harm
