= Device =

A device is usually a constructed tool. Device may also refer to:

== Technology ==
=== Computing, electronics, mechanisms and telecommunication ===
- Appliance, a device for a particular task
- Computer, a computing device
- Device file, an interface of a peripheral device driver
- Electronic component, a device that can be embedded in the construction of electronic hardware
- Gadget, generally synonymous with device; often used when a more specific word is not well-known or cannot be recalled
- Handheld device, a small computer such as a phone or tablet
- Machine, a mechanical device
- Medical device, a device intended for medical use
- Peripheral device, hardware that is external but accessible to a computer

=== Weapons ===
- Improvised explosive device (IED)
- Nuclear weapon

== Arts, entertainment, and media ==
=== Music ===
==== Groups ====
- Device (metal band), American industrial metal band active 2012–2014
- Device (pop-rock band), American pop-rock trio from the mid 1980s

==== Albums ====
- Device (Device album), 2013
- Device (Eon album), 2006

=== Other uses in arts, entertainment, and media ===
- Plot device, as in storytelling
- Rhetorical device, a technique used in writing or speaking
- The Device, a 2014 American science fiction horror film

== Other uses ==
- Dev1ce or Device, nicknames for Nicolai Reedtz, a Danish professional Counter-Strike player
- Device, something that can be trademarked, such as a logotype (or "logo") in printing or in law
- Devices, aspects of a military-award decoration in the United Kingdom
- Personal device, another name for a heraldic badge

== People with the surname Device ==
- Alizon Device (died 1612), executed as one of the Pendle witches
- Elizabeth Device (died 1612), executed as one of the Pendle witches
- James Device (died 1612), executed as one of the Pendle witches
- Jennet Device (fl. 1612), witness at the trial of the Pendle witches

== See also ==
- Devise (disambiguation)
