= Lease and release =

A lease and release is a form of conveyance of real property involving the lease of land by its owner to a tenant, followed by a release (relinquishment) of the landlord's interest in the property to the tenant. This sequence of transactions was commonly used to transfer full freehold title to real estate under real property law. The lease and release was a mode of conveyance of freehold estates formerly common in England and in New York. Between its parties it achieves the same outcome as a deed of grant/transfer/conveyance.

== History ==
The lease and release is said by Blackstone to have been invented by Serjeant Moore, soon after the enactment of the Statute of Uses. It was a way of avoiding the Statute of Enrolments which required enrolment of a bargain and sale. A lease, in fact being a bargain and sale upon some pecuniary consideration for one year or some other nominal term, is made by the bargainor of a whole freehold (with no fetter on alienation) to a lessee who is in fact the bargainee (buyer), "by the force of the Statute made for transferring Uses into possession". This, without any enrolment, makes the bargainor stand seised to the use of the bargainee, and vests in the bargainee the use of the term. Then, the Statute of Uses operates to execute the use and annexe the possession. Being thus in possession, the bargainee or lessee is capable of receiving a release of the freehold and reversion, made to the bargainee in possession; and, accordingly, the next day a "release" is granted to him by the bargainor. As the lessee now owned both the current and future interests in the land, the lease and release amounted to a conveyance and was held to be equivalent to a feoffment. The original lease and release was devised by Sergeant Moore for the benefit of Lord Norris, "to avoid the unpleasant notoriety of a livery or attornment."

In 1841, the Conveyance by Release without Lease Act was passed, which made a "statutory release" sufficient in England for conveying freehold land without the need for an earlier lease by bargain and sale. The release was finally replaced in England in 1845 by a simple "grant", called a conveyance.

== See also ==
- Conveyance
- Deed
- Fee
- Freehold
