= Penal notice =

Endorsement of a court order indicating potential legal penalties

In civil procedure a penal notice is a warning endorsed on a court order, which notifies the recipient is liable to committal to prison or to pay a fine for breach of the order. In the case of a company or corporation, their assets may be seized.
