= Feoffee =

English feudal trustee of land

Under the feudal system in England, a feoffee (/fɛˈfiː, fiːˈfiː/) is a trustee who holds a fief (or "fee"), that is to say an estate in land, for the use of a beneficial owner. The term is more fully stated as a feoffee to uses of the beneficial owner. The use of such trustees developed towards the end of the era of feudalism in the Middle Ages and declined with the formal ending of that social and economic system in 1660. The development of feoffees to uses may have hastened the end of the feudal system, since their operation circumvented vital feudal fiscal mechanisms.

== Development ==
The practice of enfeoffing feoffees with fees, that is to say of granting legal seizin in one's land-holdings ("holdings" as only the king himself "owned" land by his allodial title) to a group of trusted friends or relatives or other allies whilst retaining use of the lands, began to be widespread by about 1375. The purpose of such an action was two-fold:

- Akin to modern tax avoidance, it was a legal loop-hole to avoid the suffering of the customary feudal incidents, namely the payment of feudal relief on an inheritance, the temporary loss of control of a fiefdom through wardship where the landholder was under the age of majority of 21, and the forcible marriage of a young heiress. Nor could the land-holding escheat, that is to say revert permanently to the overlord, as was customary where the land-holder died without a legal heir. When the fiefdom was held by a group of feoffees, the death of the beneficial holder was legally irrelevant to its continued holding by them. They simply allow the lands to continue to be used by the deceased's heir. The feoffees are "an undying corporation which never suffered a minority and could not be given in marriage" (McFarlane, p. 146). The feudal overlord, the king himself if the land was held in-chief, was not entitled to exact feudal relief from the new beneficiary nor was he entitled to seize control of the lands and their revenues until such heir was of full-age, nor was he entitled to sell the heiress in marriage or to marry her to one of his own sons. This had a considerably deleterious effect on the royal finances, which state of affairs was rectified by the aggressive and imaginative new fiscal measures taken by King Henry VII after his accession in 1485.
- The land-holder was able effectively to bequeath his land to whomsoever he wished, and was no longer bound by the custom of primogeniture where the eldest son alone had the right, on payment of the appropriate feudal relief, to inherit, that is to demand to be re-enfeoffed with his father's land-holdings by his father's overlord.

The effect was that on a man's death he appeared to hold little or no land, whilst in reality he had full use of it and of the revenues derived from it. If he was thought by the county escheator to have been a tenant-in-chief, a jury for an Inquisition post mortem would be convened to enquire into what manors he held from the king and who was his legal heir. Frequently the verdict of such inquisitions even in the case of the decease of the most influential men of the county, was "he holds no lands of the king in this county". Such reports can be a major source of confusion to the modern historian or biographer who is unaware of the operation of feoffees to uses. As McFarlane summarised "it can make a great landowner (sic) appear to die a landless man".

== Procedure for creation ==
To effect such an arrangement a sealed charter was usually drawn up which specified all relevant matters, such as who the feoffees were to be, to whose use the feoffees were to hold the lands, for what period, who were the desired heirs of the settlor, what provision should be made for his widow, etc. Such charter appears as a conveyance or alienation, and may be mistaken as such by the unwary modern researcher. Likewise, such a charter may be misinterpreted by the modern observer as signifying that those named as recipients of the conveyance are themselves beneficial owners in the form of a commercial partnership, and therefore may be mistaken for wealthy men.

== Legal status ==
Feoffee is a historical term relating to the law of trusts and equity, referring to the owner of a legal title of a property when he is not the equitable owner. Feoffees essentially had their titles stripped by the Statute of Uses 1535, whereby the legal title to the property being held by the feoffee was transferred to their cestui que use. The modern equivalent of a feoffee to uses is the trustee, one who holds a legal and managerial ownership in trust for the enjoyment benefit and use of the beneficiary.

== Modern usage ==
The term is still in use today to mean a trustee invested with a freehold estate held in possession for a purpose, typically a charitable one. Some examples include: the trustees of the Chetham's Hospital charity in Manchester, in the towns of Colyton, Devon and Bungay in Suffolk, and the trustees of the Sponne and Bickerstaffe charity in Towcester, Northamptonshire. The Feoffees of St Michael's Spurriergate are the trustees of a charity that helps with the restoration of churches in York. In Ipswich, Massachusetts, US the Feoffees of the Grammar School have been trustees of a piece of land donated for the use of the town since the 1600s. In the village of Ecclesfield, South Yorkshire, the feoffees contribute to looking after the fabric of the church, Church of St Mary, Ecclesfield and also make other donations for the benefit of the local population but in the past they used to have responsibility for law and order, punishment of the guilty and upkeep of the roads. The Spalding Rectory Feoffees were formed in 1620 to pay the stipend of the Vicar of Spalding, Lincolnshire, which they continue to do.

Other examples are the companies of the Selby Feoffee and Welfare Charity and the Chittlehampton Feoffees.

As of 2021, there are 135 active feoffees registered at the Charity Commission in Britain and four feoffees registered at Companies House.

== See also ==
- Fee (or Fief or Fiefdom)
- Fee simple
- Feu
- Legal history
- Feudal land tenure
- Land tenure

== Sources ==
- McFarlane, K.B., Lancastrian Kings and Lollard Knights, Oxford, 1972, Part 2, Introduction, pp. 144–147
