= Cestui que =

Concept in English law regarding beneficiaries

Cestui que (/ˌsɛstwi ˈkeɪ/ SEST-wee KAY; also cestuy que, cestui a que) is a historical Law French term denoting beneficiary status in a trust.

Specifically, the term cestui que refers to any person or persons for whose benefit the trust is explicitly created. Unless restricted by the trust instrument, any such party is fully entitled to the equitable interests as outlined such as annual rents/produce/interest of the property forming the trust assets in question.

The term is no longer common in modern trusts law.

== Etymology ==
The term itself is derived from a longer Law French phrase of medieval English invention: "cestui a que use le feoffment fuit fait", lit. 'the person for whose use/benefit the feoffment was made'. The shortened version appears in a number of legal phrases, including cestui que trust, cestui que use, or cestui que vie. Cestui que use and cestui que trust are often used interchangeably, and in some medieval documents this is sometimes also written as cestui a que. In the discourse of jurisprudence as well as legal history, cestui que has frequently been used in reference to the relative novelty of the trust as a legal concept.

== Uses and subcategories ==
There are two subsets of cestui que: cestui que use and cestui que trust. These are shown in the following examples.

Land is granted to or held by A, for the use of B in trust for the duration of his or her life. When B dies, the remainder goes to C.

In this case, A is the trustee, B is cestui que use, and C is the cestui que trust. If B and C are the same person, which is often the case, the two terms will both refer to that same person. While common, a life-long duration is not essential; it can also last for a term of years, a shorter period, or for the life of another person.

While still used by some members of the judiciary and legal writers, cestui que and its derived terms have fallen out of everyday use in most modern legal parlance. In general trust law, it has largely been supplanted by the term beneficiary (where a similar sub-distinction is made: the life tenant and the beneficiary in remainder).

== Original purposes ==
Both of the aforementioned categories of cestui que are rooted in the feudal law dominant in most of European Christendom during the Middle Ages. As a concept, it originated as a means to avoid feudal levies (most forms of servitude) due to an overlord by passing land on for the use of another person, namely one free of such obligations. The law of cestui que tended to defer jurisdiction to courts of equity as opposed to the less flexible common law courts. The device was often used by people who might be absent from the kingdom for an extended time (as on a Crusade, or a business venture), who held a tenancy in the land and in return owed feudal incidents (services) to the landlord. This would allow the land to be left for the use of a third party.

Any such "in trust" legal status was partly to circumvent the Statute of Mortmain, which sought to end the relatively common practice of leaving real property (land, milling rights, markets, fisheries) to the Church (meaning any of its branches) following the tenant's death, so as to avoid dues (inquisitions post mortem) which could, if left unpaid, lead to reversion or repossession of the tenancy to the landlord. Two concepts explain the origin of mortmain ("dead hand"): first, it can be interpreted in reference to the desire of the deceased donor and former owner to pass on properties to the Church; second, because the Church (a legal person recognized by the common law) is not a person but an institution that could never die or be declared dead in the legal sense, the land never leaves its "dead hand". Before Edward I issued the statutes between 1278 and 1290, vast tracts of land were left directly to the Church, which never relinquished it. Other land could be transferred to anyone, inherited only through a family line (sometimes only the male line), or revert to an over-lord or the Crown upon the death of the tenant. The Church's accumulation of land had been a source of contention between the Crown and the Church for centuries. Creating a trust in such a way allowed the Church to continue reaping material benefit from the lands in question, because the legal title of ownership (meaning right to transfer if needed and gain or lose in capital) would be transferred to a corporation of lawyers or other entities (trustees) legally separate from but acting on behalf of the Church to maintain the status quo before the statute.

== History in German and Roman law ==
It is the opinion of William Holdsworth quoting such scholars as Gilbert, Sanders, Blackstone, Spence and Digby, that cestui que in English law had a Roman origin. An analogy exists between cestui que uses and a usufruct or the bequest of a fideicommissum. These all tended to create a feoffment to one person for the use of another. However, legal scholars such as Gilbert and Blackstone note "that they answer more to the fideicommissum than the usufructus of the civil law". These were transplanted into England from Roman civil law about the close of the reign of Edward III of England by means of foreign ecclesiastics who introduced them to evade the Statutes of Mortmain. Others argue that the comparison between cestui que and Roman law is merely superficial. The transfer of land for the use of one person for certain purposes to be carried out either in the lifetime or after the death of the person conveying it has its basis in Germanic law. It was popularly held that land could be transferred for the use from one person to another in local custom. The formal English or Saxon law did not always recognize this custom. The practice was called Salman or Treuhand. Sala is Old High German for "transfer". It is related to the Old English sellen, "to sell".

The earliest appearance of cestui que in the medieval period was the feoffee to uses, which, like the Salman, was held on account of another. This was called the cestui que use. It was because the feoffor could impose on him many various duties that landowners acquired through his instrumentality the power to do many things with their land. This was used to avoid the rigidity of medieval common law of land and its uses. Germanic law was familiar with the idea that a man who holds property on account of, or to the use of another is bound to fulfil his trust. Frankish formulas from the Merovingian period describe property given to a church ad opus sancti illius ("for the use of its saint"). Mercian books in the ninth century convey land ad opus monachorum ("for the use of monks"). The Domesday Book of 1086 refers to geld or money, sac and soc held in ad opus regis ("for the use of the king"), or in reginae ("of the queen") or vicecomitis ("of the viscount"). The laws of William I of England speak of the sheriff holding money al os le rei ("for the use of the king").

Others state that the cestui que use trust was the product of Roman law. In England it was the invention of ecclesiastics who wanted to escape the Statute of Mortmain. The goal was to obtain a conveyance of an estate to a friendly person or corporation, with the intent that the use of the estate would reside with the original owner.

Pollock and Maitland describe cestui que use as the first step toward the law of agency. They note that the word "use" as it was employed in medieval English law was not from the Latin usus, but rather from the Latin word opus, meaning "work". From this came the Old French words os or oes. Although with time the Latin document for conveying land to the use of John would be written ad opus Johannis ("for the work of John") which was interchangeable with ad usum Johannis, or the fuller formula, ad opus et ad usum, the earliest history suggests the term "use" evolved from ad opus.

== Medieval invention ==
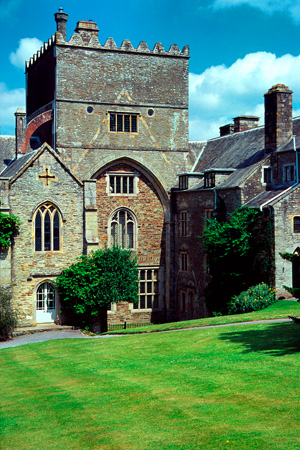
Cistercian Buckland Abbey, established on land near Yelverton, Devon, donated by Amice de Clare, Countess of Devon in 1278

Many different reasons have been given for the invention of the cestui que use as a legal device. During the Crusades, and other wars on the continent, landowners might be gone for long periods of time. Others might be absent because of business adventures or religious pilgrimages. There was no assurance they would ever return home. The cestui que use allowed them to leave a trusted friend or relative with the sort of powers, discretion, their hopes, and their duties. Today, this power would be called the "power of attorney". Religious orders such as Franciscans, Cistercians, Benedictines and other mendicant orders took vows of poverty, yet retained the use of donated property. Cestui que use allowed them the benefits of land without legal ownership.

Besides the obvious limitations placed on cestui que by the Statute of Mortmain, the Statute of Uses and the Statute of Wills, its legality was shaped indirectly by provisions within Magna Carta and Quia Emptores.

== Typical medieval patterns ==
Derek Roebuck has given the following typical fact patterns which were often found in medieval cestui que use:

Example 1: Albert is the owner of a landholding called Blackacre. He conveys this to Richard with the command that Richard hold the land with the duty not for Richard's benefit, but for a different purpose. This could be to do a job, such as collect rents and profits for the purpose of passing them to a third person, Lucy. This was nothing more than a clever legal device with Richard playing either an active or passive role.

Example 2: If Jane (women could engage in cestui que use) granted Blackacre to Charles to the use of David, then David became the beneficial owner and Jane could not vary or detract from that ownership.

Example 3: If Mary wanted to grant Blackacre away from her direct heir James to her younger son Jasper, then she might well do so by a grant of Richard to the use of Jasper in tail, remainder to James in fee simple. Only Richard had a legal estate, the interests of Jasper and James being equitable analogues of a legal fee tail and fee simple in remainder.

Example 4: If Mary wanted to make a will of the equitable ownership of Blackacre, she would be able to do so by a grant to Richard to the use of herself, Mary. The ownership of Blackacre did not pass on Mary's death to her heir but went to wherever she might will it. By this method, Mary could keep her wishes secret until her death when her will would be read, and would prevail. This was a way to defeat primogeniture inheritance.

Example 5: Uses were so common by the middle of the fifteenth century that they were presumed to be in existence even if no intention could be proved. If Martin granted Blackacre to Martha, and she could show no consideration (that is, that she paid for it), then Martha would be considered in equity to be the feoffee to unspecified uses to be announced at Martin's discretion. If Martin sold Blackacre to Martha, but did not go through the formal routines of feoffment to complete the conveyance, Martha could not become the legal owner. But in equity, Martin held the land to the cestui que use of Martha. It would have been unconscionable for him to do otherwise having taken her money for the sale of Blackacre.

Example 6: Albert might convey Blackacre to Richard for the use of Jane. In this case, Richard was called the "feoffee or trustee [of uses]". This device (any trust) separated legal from beneficial ownership.

== Cestui que as a method of fraud ==
In this context, the term is used to mean the trust itself.

From the Doctor and Student (1518) "It will be somewhat long and peradventure somewhat tedious to show all the causes particularly." By the fifteenth century, cestui que use was a vehicle to defraud creditors. The main use was to leave land, or parts of land, to members of the family other than the primary heir. This was a way to avoid primogeniture inheritance or to ensure it, in cases where the estate would be partitioned among heiresses when there is no son to inherit. While the use was intact, the occupant of the land could take advantage of the cestui que use to avoid the feudal payments and duties (incidents). Incidents such as wardship, marriage penalties and other gifts, taxes, fines, fees, and knight service were onerous. This was particularly true of wardship, because most other feudal dues had fallen from practice by the late Middle Ages. Common law did not recognize cestui que uses as such, and there was difficulty fitting these cases into the existing writs and case law.

By the mid-fifteenth century, most of the cases at Chancery – a court which dealt with equity law – involved land use. The incidents could not be enforced against a person who was on a Crusade or other war, or business adventure, as they were not present in the kingdom to be enforced to perform. Since the feudal oath was to the person, and not the land, there could be no lien against the land. A hallmark of medieval feudalism was the person-to-person oath of allegiance. Feudal incidents could not be enforced upon the beneficiaries, since these were not the owners of the land. The users had not sworn an oath to the lord. Therefore, they owed the lord nothing. They lacked the estate until the trust ended, if entitled to its residue. They had no seisin, nor trespassed, and therefore, ejectment could not be effected. These required possession. Assumpsit was of no avail. In 1402, the House of Commons had petitioned the king for a remedy against dishonest feoffees to uses, apparently with no result. A trust became a novel kind of property and property use.

== Henry VII ==
Concerted efforts were made under King Henry VII to reform cestui que. A change in the laws made feoffees the absolute owners of the property of which they had been enfeoffed, and they became subject to all the liabilities of ownership. They were the only ones who could take proceedings against those who interfered with their ownership. If a trespass had been committed with the license of the cestui que use they could take proceedings against him, for he was at law only a tenant at sufferance. Similarly, feoffees were the only ones who could take the proceedings against tenants of the land to compel them to perform their obligations.

If a debt was brought for rent by a cestui que use, and the defendant pleaded nihil habuit tempore dimissions, the plaintiff would have lost his action if he had not made a special replication setting out the facts.

The purpose of these changes was to make cestui que in general, and cestui que use trusts more cumbersome and economically unattractive.

== Henry VIII ==
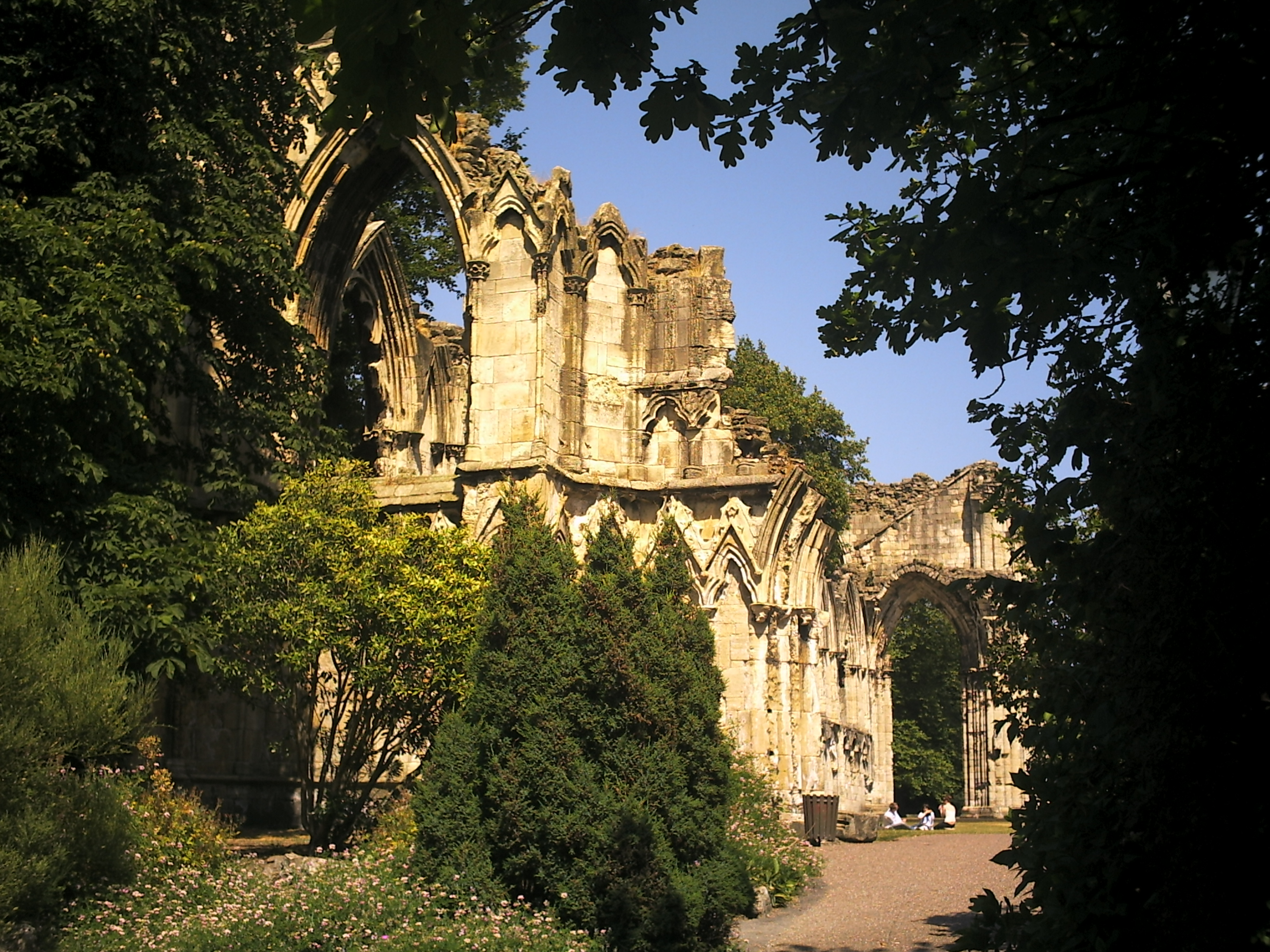
St. Mary's Abbey, York, a Benedictine monastery dissolved by Henry VIII in 1539

Henry VIII sought to end all cestui que uses and regain the incidents (fees and payments) that had been deprived him. Thomas Cromwell and Audley, who succeeded Thomas More, vigorously crushed cestui que uses in the courts, persuading judges to declare them illegal or void. By around 1538, over 800 religious land holdings had been returned to the Crown. Many of these were subsequently sold, converted to private dwellings, given to loyal supporters of the English Reformation, dismantled for building materials, or abandoned and allowed to degenerate into ruins. Claims of religious corruption were frequently used to justify reclamation by the Crown. Since many of these religious orders provided charity, much of the local medical and social services were left in disarray.

=== Statute of Uses ===
The Statute of Uses was enacted in 1535, and was intended to end the "abuses" which had incurred in cestui que use. It declared that any holder of a cestui que use became the holder of the legal title of the ownership in fee simple. This voided the advantages of a cestui que use. The feoffee to uses was bypassed. The cestui que use had seisin. Henry VIII regained the feudal incidents. The land owner lost the ability to will the land to heirs other than those in direct lineage. There could be no bypassing of heirs with a cestui que. This condition was modified in the Statute of Wills (1540). One of the effects of the Statute of Uses in executing the use, was to make a mere sale of land without feoffment (the formal public transfer) effective to pass the legal estate. The buyer became the owner by operation of the statute. It necessitated a public announcement of the intended sale to determine if the land had been surreptitiously sold to someone else. The Statute of Uses required a public registry of sale of land, later called the Statute of Enrollments.

Lord Hardwicke wrote that the Statute had no real effect other than to add at most three words to a conveyance. He was referring to the doctrine that had become settled before his time: that the old use might still be effected despite the Statute, by a "use on a use". The Statute of Uses had been considered a great failure. It did not wipe out double ownership, legal and equitable, which has survived into the modern system of trusts. The preamble of the Statute went far in enumerating the abuses the system of uses had brought into play. The Statute did not, as had previously been suggested, try to remedy these abuses by declaring any uses void. It merely declared that the possession should be transferred to the use and that the cestui que use should have the possession after such manner and form as he had before the use.

=== In re Chudleigh's Case ===
In re Chudleigh's Case was the first application of the Statute of Uses, and occurred fifty years after its enactment. This case was argued several times in front of several courts in England. It has been described as a judicial scrutiny of "use on a use". Francis Bacon argued for the defence. The case is replete with desultory and curious discussion which, in the opinion of Lord Hardwicke, is difficult to understand. The disposition and policy of the judges was to check contingent uses, which they deemed to be productive of mischiefs and tending to perpetuities. They regarded the Statute of Uses as intending to extirpate uses, which were often found to be subtle and fraudulent contrivances. Their evident object was to restore the simplicity and integrity of the common law.

The great controversy in Chudleigh's Case was whether the Statute of Uses had reduced the feoffee to uses to a mere conduit pipe through which possession passed to the cestui que use, or whether he still retained some of the old powers he had before the Statute of Uses. What the majority judges sought in the case was just what the projectors of the present property reform in England were after, the free alienability of land. Chudleigh's Case became known as the Case of Perpetuities. The case turned on the doctrine of scintilla juris which Bacon called metaphysics of the worst kind. Scintilla juris (Latin: a spark of right) is a legal fiction allowing feoffees to uses to support contingent uses when they come into existence, thereby enabling the Statute of Uses to execute them. Chudleigh's Case represented the turning point of the old medieval common law of cestui que uses, and the trend towards modernity. Bacon suggested that Justice Coke had "ripped uses from their cradle".

== United States cases ==
=== Town of Pawlet v. Clark (1815) ===
In the 1815 case of Town of Pawlet v. Clark the United States Supreme Court found that a Royal grant of land to the Church of England in the colony of New Hampshire was not completed. The grant had been made prior to the American Revolutionary War, and the State of Vermont, as successor to the English Crown, could claim the land and convey it to the town of Pawlet for schools. The cestui que nature of the trust which held the land was found to be void. The Episcopal Church in the town had no right or title to the land.

=== Terrett v. Taylor (1815) ===
In the 1815 case of Terrett v. Taylor, the United States Supreme Court found that the State of Virginia could not expropriate property of the formerly established Episcopal Church or abolish its incorporation. At issue was a 516-acre (2.09 km^{2}) land grant which was given in deed of bargain and sale on 18 September 1770 by the direction of the then vestry of the church. The land had been conveyed to Townsend Dade and James Wren, both of the county and 44 other church wardens, and to their successors in office in a form of cestui que for the use and benefit of the said church in the said parish.

=== Society for Propagation of the Gospel v. Town of New Haven (1823) ===
The 1823 case of Society for the Propagation of the Gospel v. Town of New Haven looked at the issue of lands granted to an English corporate body, the "Society" which had a religious purpose. The land had been granted by King George III of Great Britain in New Hampshire in 1761. It was held in corporation by a form of cestui que. On 30 October 1794, the State of Vermont passed a statute whereby the land of the Society would be appropriated by the state. The Supreme Court was divided in its opinion. It ruled that the property of English corporations at the time of the Revolution were protected by the Treaty of Peace, 1783. See Treaty of Paris (1783), Treaty of Versailles (1783). There could be no confiscations of such corporate holdings or lands because of the treaty.

=== Beatty v. Kurtz (1829) ===
In the 1829 case of Beatty v. Kurtz, the United States Supreme Court decided on the issue of a title in an unincorporated Lutheran Church land. The land had been used as a cemetery. The fact that the land was held by a non-corporation was deficient at law. Nevertheless, equity permitted settlement of the title in the favor of the church organization out of religious sensitivity and sensibility. There should be sentiments for the kindred of the deceased.

=== Goesele v. Bimeler (1852) ===
A group of German separatists settled land in Ohio. The lands were held in community, and there was a renunciation of individual property. All crops and goods were donated to the community. Later the community formally incorporated, using the terms of the previous unincorporated association. The nature of the holding was in the form of a traditional cestui que use. The heirs of a deceased member of the Society of Separatists sued, seeking a portion of the lands held in community. In Goesele v. Bimeler (1852), the United States Supreme Court ruled that the descendant heirs of the deceased member could not recover.

== United States case law of recovery from disseisee in cestui que ==
A few American jurisdictions place unusual burdens on a purchaser to ensure their transaction will be upheld. A purchaser or grantee from a person whose land is adversely held is precluded from maintaining an action in their own name to oust the adverse possessor and any other legal possessor. A conveyance of such land is champertous and void. The limited (adverse) title to the land remains in the grantor and the grantee cannot maintain an action for breach of the covenant in the conveyance. The fact that the transaction was fair and bona fide (with no legal connection between the parties being at arm's length, without notice and for value) does not change the rule. It has been said that the common law doctrine is obsolete, not being suitable to conditions and circumstances of the people of this country.

Possession by a cestui que trust is not adverse to his trustee, and such possession will not void the latter to be champertous.

== United States rule against perpetuities ==
In the United States the rule against perpetuities, where it is in effect, applies to both legal and equitable interests, created in trust. In modern trust law, the term "cestui que" is rarely used outside historical contexts; instead, the party who benefits from a trust is commonly referred to as the beneficiary, who holds an equitable interest in the trust property distinct from legal title held by the trustee. The rule varies from state to state. The common law rule may be stated, "No interest is good unless it must vest, if at all, not later than twenty-one years after some life in being at the date of the creation of the interest." Vesting indicates a right to an interest in the trust. The rule is directed entirely against remoteness in vesting. An identification of the person whose interest is defined by the trust, must either vest or fail in a specified time. Any interest which may remain contingent beyond the period of the rule is invalid. A beneficiary must be an identifiable person born within the time span of the trust, and vest in it. All interests in a charitable trust, are subject to the rule with a few exceptions. A charitable trust which gives a gift from the first charity to a second charity on a condition precedent is not void by reason of the fact that the condition may not occur without the period of the Rule. (See Example 2 below.) Property transferred from a non-charity and then left over to a second charity on a remote contingency is void. (See Example 3 below.)

=== Examples of the rule against perpetuities ===
Example 1: Alex leaves property in trust to Bill to hold for the benefit of Alex's children during their lives and on the death of the last survivor of Alex's children, to distribute the principle to Alex's grandchildren then living. At Alex's death he has three children living, C1, C2 and C3. It is certain that the remainder to the grandchildren will vest at the death of one of the three whose life will span both the time of the creation of the interest (Alex's death) and the vesting of the interest (his own death). It is unnecessary to determine whether it will be C1, C2 or C3.

Example 2: Alphonse leaves property to Brandon in a trust to pay the income to St. John's Church, located in Anytown, so long as it conducts its regular services in accordance with the Book of Common Prayer, 1789 Version. If at any time it should discontinue this practice, then the trust income reverts to St. Matthew's Church. This is a valid contingency.

Example 3: Beth leaves property in trust to hold for Mary's children for life and on the death of Mary's last surviving child, the property reverts to Mary's living female grandchildren. If no female grandchild is living, then the property reverts to the Cathedral School for Girls. Mary is living at the time of Beth's death. The gift to the Cathedral School is void.

Example 4: Albert leaves property to Thomas in trust to pay the income to St. Mark's Church so long as it conducts its regular services in accordance with the Book of Common Prayer, 1789 Version. If at any time in the future, it should discontinue to so conduct its services in such a manner, the income passes to Robert, or Robert's heirs then living. The gift over is void because it may remain contingent for a period longer than the rule against perpetuities. It makes no difference that it is preceded by a gift to charity.

Example 5: Martin leaves property to Joseph in trust to hold for the benefit of St. Vincent's Church if it should adopt a new liturgy proposed by the religious convention held in 1970. The gift is void. The contingency may not occur within the period of the Rule. There is no exception for a gift to charity under such circumstances.

=== Wait and see rule ===
A wait and see approach time-fetters litigants seeking to void a trust on the grounds of a potential, later or residuary use invalidity, due to alleged perpetuity. Under this, the court may decide validity of future estates only once the prior estate has vested in another or ended and then tests whether the interest violates the rule by the events which have actually happened rather than adjudicating on all the possibilities drawn up.

=== Cy-près rule ===
The cy-près doctrine was also instituted to mitigate the harshness of the common law rule against perpetuities. Cy-près means "as near as possible" or "as close as possible". Cy-près allows the court to reform the interest within the limits of the rule to approximate most closely the intention of the creator of the interest. Both wait-and-see and cy-près approaches have been adopted by the American Law Institute as to the traditional rule against perpetuities.

== See also ==
- Trust law
