= Sasine =

Scots land deed

Sasine in Scots law is the delivery of feudal property, typically land.

Feudal property means immovable property, and includes everything that naturally goes with the property. For land, that would include such things as buildings, trees, and underground minerals. A superior (e.g., a heritor) might authorise his agent or factor to give possession of his property to someone else through a document known as a "precept of sasine". One of the earliest records in Scotland is from 1248 when Sir Malcolm, son of the then Earl of Lennox, ‘conferred full Sasine’ of certain lands at Strathblane to Sir David Graham.

Over time, sasine came to be used in common speech as a reference to the deed or document recording the transfer, rather than to the transfer itself. Hence phrases such as "to give sasines", "to deliver sasines", "to receive sasines", "to take sasines".

Alternative spellings include: seizin, seisin, sasin, seasin, sasing, seasing, sesin, seasin, sesine, seasine, saisine.

== Additional explanations ==
A Register of Sasines was created in every locality by the Registration Act 1617 (c. 16 (S)). It functions to this day on a national level as the General Register of Sasines.

Transfers of property were originally by symbolic delivery, by handing over a clump of ground or a stone or similar object on the property itself, and then registering the "deed of conveyance" in the local "Register of Sasines". The term 'Instrument of Sasine' was actually the recording of the event of the symbolic delivery of the property as witnessed, and minuted, by a court official in attendance for that purpose. Actual sasines on the land itself were made unnecessary by an the Infeftment Act 1845 (8 & 9 Vict. c. 35). The "instrument of sasines" was superseded by the recording of the conveyance with a "warrant of registration" by the Titles to Land (Scotland) Act 1858 (21 & 22 Vict. c. 76). The last legal ceremony of sasine in Scotland was performed in 2002 as Glenmorangie handed over the land of St Mary's Chapel in Easter Ross to the Cadboll Trust.

The corresponding term in English law was livery of seisin (but not the term seisin).

== See also ==
- Seisin, English and French feudal equivalent
- Livery of seisin
- Moot hill, a sasine ceremony of barony rights
