= Livery of seisin =

Archaic feudal property conveyancing ceremony

Livery of seisin (/ˈsiːzɪn/) is an archaic legal conveyancing ceremony, formerly practised in feudal England and in other countries following English common law, used to convey holdings in property. The term livery is closely related to if not synonymous with delivery used in some jurisdictions in contract law or the related law of deeds. The oldest forms of common law provided that a valid conveyance of a feudal tenure in land required physical transfer by the transferor to the transferee in the presence of witnesses of a piece of the ground itself, in the literal sense of a hand-to-hand passing of an amount of soil, a twig, key to a building on that land, or other token.

== Varieties ==
Livery of seisin could refer to either:

- Livery in deed, whereby the parties met together on the land and the transferor symbolically delivered possession of the land by handing over a twig or a clump of earth to the recipient.
- Livery in law, whereby the parties went within sight of the land and the transferor declared to the recipient that possession was being given, followed by the recipient entering onto the land.

The symbol of livery for a house was the door's ring or hasp; for mills, the "clap and hopper"; for a church, a psalm book and keys, and so on.

== Legend ==
According to Widukind of Corvey, a Saxon in Thuringia was approached by a local who asked to buy the Saxon's torc and bracelets. The local offered him a pile of dirt in exchange for the ornaments, which the Saxon eagerly accepted. The Thuringians thought they had made a good deal until the Saxons claimed the entire country on the basis that the dirt had been a livery of seisin, and made their legal claim good by force of arms.

== Turf and twig ceremony ==
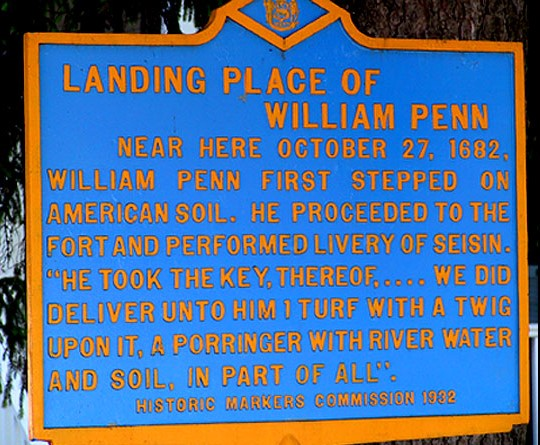
Delaware historical marker commemorating William Penn taking possession of his American property with the turf and twig ceremony

The turf and twig ceremony dates from the feudal era but was used regularly in early colonial America allowing the English and Scottish (after 1707 termed the British), by virtue of their monarch's claims, to take sovereign possession over unclaimed lands. The process has taken several forms over the centuries.

The last legal ceremony of seisin (sasine) in Scotland was performed in 2002 as Glenmorangie handed over the land of St Mary’s Chapel in Easter Ross to the Cadboll Trust.

== Inquisitions post mortem and livery of seisin ==
Under the feudal system all land belonged to the monarch and was therefore either held by him directly (the royal demesne) or on his behalf, directly or indirectly.

Those who held land directly on the king’s behalf were known as tenants in chief. When a tenant in chief died without an heir his lands "escheated" to (fell into the hands of) the king. If there was an heir, the king kept the lands until a livery of seisin took place: the heir paid a sum of money, a "relief", to take lawfully, "assume possession" of the land.

If the heir was under age the king kept the lands until he or she came of age (at 21 for men or 14 for women) and the king received rights of wardship and marriage, collecting the revenues of the estate and disposing of the heir in marriage. He was able to sell these rights to third parties, who were not necessarily the ward's next of kin. These feudal tenures and rights were abolished in the Interregnum, reintroduced and then abolished in the following period of government, the reign of Charles II (1660–1685).

== Continuing ecclesiastical use ==
A vestige of the procedure survives in the act by which a candidate is admitted to the office of incumbent in the Church of England. Canon C11 provides:

- The bishop, after giving institution to any priest, shall issue directions for induction to the archdeacon or other the person to whom induction belongs, who shall thereupon induct the said priest into possession of the temporalities of the benefice.
  - The archdeacon or other such person, when he makes the induction, shall take the priest who is to be inducted by the hand and lay it upon the key or upon the ring of the church door, or if the key cannot be had and there is no ring on the door, or if the church be in ruins, upon any part of the wall of the church or churchyard, at the same time reading the words of induction; after which the priest who has been inducted shall toll the bell to make his induction public and known to the people.

== See also ==
- Earth and water
- Sasine, Scottish feudal equivalent
- Seisin
