= Small appliance =

Portable or semi-portable machine in use to accomplish household task

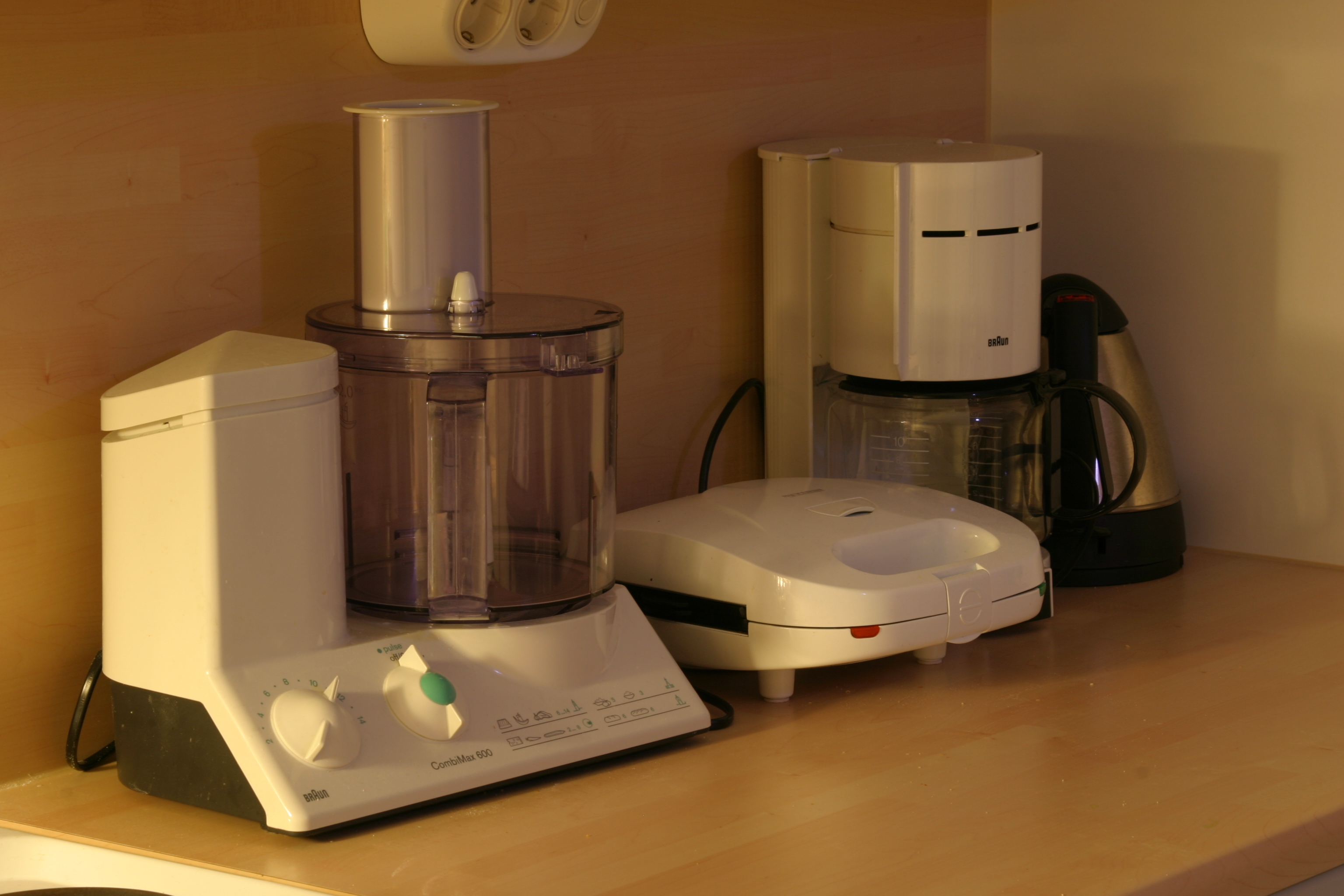
Small appliances in a kitchen: a food processor, a waffle iron, a coffee maker, and an electric kettle

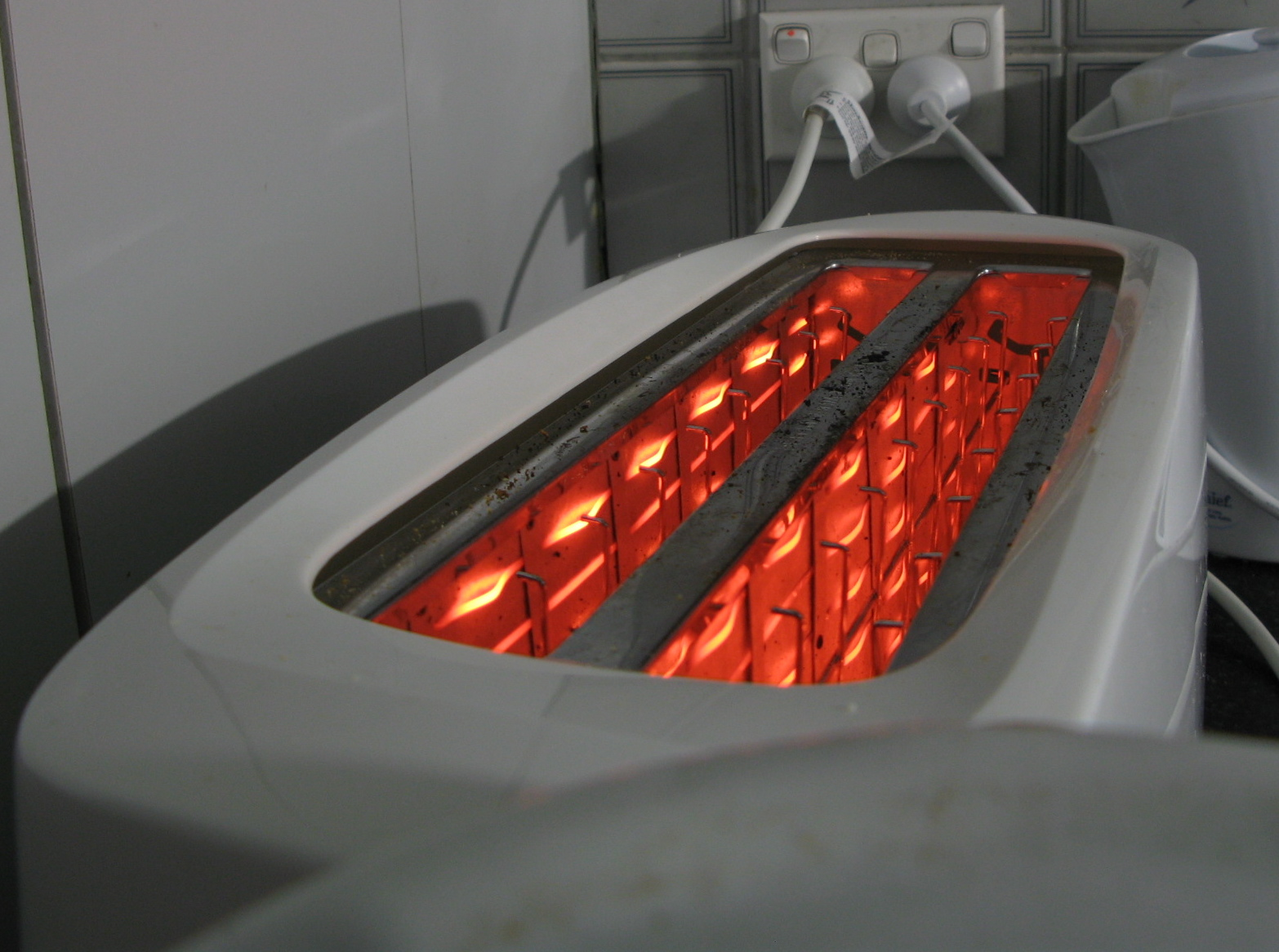
Glowing filaments of a modern 2-slice toaster

A small domestic appliance (also known as a small electric appliance or minor appliance or simply a small appliance, small domestic or small electric) is a portable or semi-portable machine, generally used on table-tops, counter-tops or other platforms, to accomplish a household task. Examples include microwave ovens, kettles, toasters, humidifiers, food processors and coffeemakers. They contrast with major appliances (known as "white goods" in the UK), such as the refrigerators and washing machines, which cannot be easily moved and are generally placed on the floor. Small appliances also contrast with consumer electronics (British "brown goods") which are for leisure and entertainment rather than purely practical tasks. Small appliances are often mechanically simple devices, typically built around a single heating element, fan, set of blades or similar mechanism with only a few mechanical linkages, which generally makes them straightforward to repair.

== Uses ==
Some small appliances perform the same or similar function as their larger counterparts. For example, a toaster oven is a small appliance that performs a similar function as an oven. Small appliances often have a home version and a commercial version, for example waffle irons, food processors, and blenders are small household appliances. A food processor will perform the tasks of chopper, slicer, mixer as well as juicer. Instead of buying multiple small appliances, you can buy a single food processor. The commercial, or industrial, version is designed to be used nearly continuously in a restaurant or other similar setting. Commercial appliances are typically connected to a more powerful electrical outlet, are larger and stronger, have more user-serviceable parts, and cost significantly more. These commercial versions are capable of performing heavy tasks in one go.

== Types and examples ==
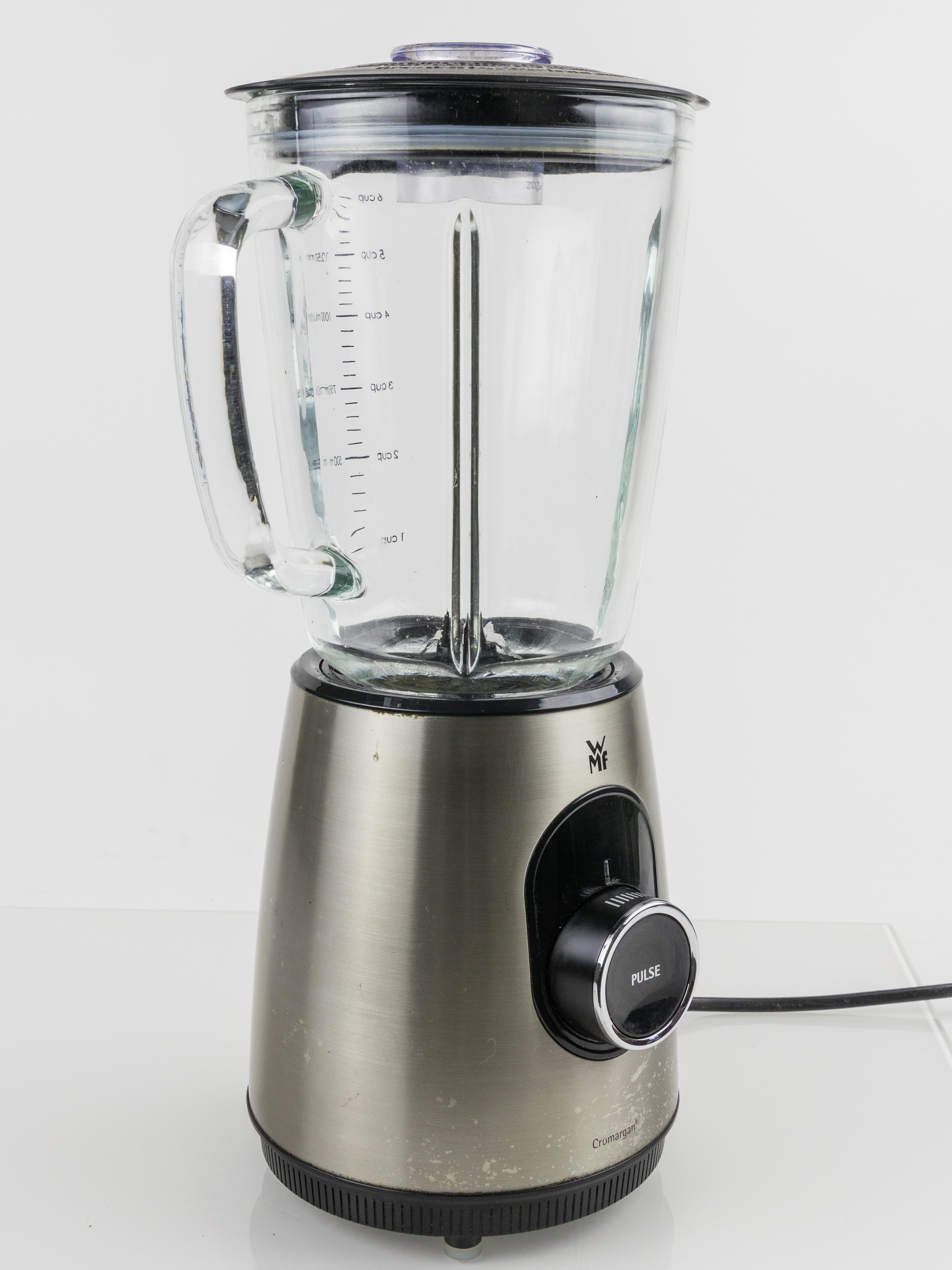
An electric blender (appliance)

Small appliances include those used for :

- Beverage-making, such as electric kettles, coffeemakers or iced tea-makers
- Cleaning, such as vacuum cleaner
- Cooking, such as on a hot plate, microwave oven, or specialty dish cooking appliance, such as rice cookers
- Lighting, using light fixtures
- Thermal comfort, such as an electric heater or fan

Many small appliances perform a combination of the above processes such as mixing, heating by a bread machine

== Prices ==
Small appliances can be very inexpensive, such as an electric can opener, hot pot, toaster, or coffee maker which may cost only a few U.S. dollars, or very expensive, such as an elaborate espresso maker, which may cost several thousand U.S. dollars. Most homes in developed economies contain several cheaper home appliances, with perhaps a few more expensive appliances, such as a high-end microwave oven or mixer. A few small appliances like chopper, juicer, grinder and mixer may cost you a few dollars. Instead of buying separate units, a food processor will generally be less expensive. Sometime these kinds of smart appliances saves money as well as space.

== Powering ==
Many small appliances are powered by electricity. The appliance may use a permanently attached cord that is plugged into a wall outlet or a detachable cord. The appliance may have a cord storage feature. A few hand-held appliances use batteries, which may be disposable or rechargeable. Some appliances consist of an electrical motor upon which is mounted various attachments so as to constitute several individual appliances, such as a blender, a food processor, or a juicer. Many stand mixers, while functioning primarily as a mixer, have attachments that can perform additional functions.

A few gasoline and gas-powered appliances exist for use in situations where electricity is not expected to be available, but these are typically larger and not as portable as most small appliances. Items that perform the same function as small appliances but are hand-powered are generally referred to as tools or gadgets, for example a hand cranked egg beater, a grater, a mandoline, or a hand-powered meat grinder.

== Safety ==
Small appliances which are defective or improperly used or maintained may cause house fires and other property damage, or may harbor bacteria if not properly cleaned. It is important that users read the instructions carefully and that appliances that use a grounded cord be attached to a grounded outlet. Because of the risk of fire, some appliances have a short detachable cord that is connected to the appliance magnetically. If the appliance is moved further than the cord length from the wall, the cord will detach from the appliance.

== Designations and regulations ==
Designations and regulations of "small appliances" vary by country and are not simply determined by physical sizes. For instance, United States Environmental Protection Agency regulations mandate that small appliances must meet two standards:

- Completely manufactured, charged, and sealed in a factory
- Contains five pounds or less of refrigerant

The designations and regulations of "small appliances" are very important in order to assure the safety of the public. Here are some rules and regulations for small appliances:

- Altering the design of certified recovered small appliances in a way that would affect the equipment's ability to meet the certification standards is strictly prohibited
- The equipment must meet the minimum requirements for certification

== Industry ==
There are a variety of categories of small appliances and various companies specialize in certain categories.

Some categories are dominated by only a few companies, especially white-label manufacturers such as Midea Group; for example, in 2021 The New York Times reported that most American microwave ovens are produced by Midea, including ovens sold by major brands such as Toshiba, Whirlpool, and Black+Decker, excluding companies which produce microwaves separately such as Haier under the GE Home Appliances brand and Panasonic which has its own China manufacturing facilities.

== Energy efficiency and environmental impact ==
As the use of small appliances has proliferated, so has their aggregate energy consumption and environmental footprint. Many jurisdictions now require energy labels on appliances such as toasters, coffee makers, and microwaves to inform consumers about typical energy usage.

The European Union, for example, mandates energy labeling and "standby power" limits for many small electrical appliances under its EcoDesign Directive, aiming to reduce the electricity wasted when devices are plugged in but not in use.

U.S. Energy Star certification also covers a growing number of small kitchen and home appliances, encouraging manufacturers to improve energy efficiency and minimize environmental impact.

== See also ==
- Appliance (disambiguation)
- Domestic technology
- List of cooking appliances
- List of home appliances
- Standby power
- Yellow goods (retail classification)
