= Statute of Uses =

Act of the Parliament of England

Statute of Uses 1535 (Note: The citation of this act by this short title was authorised by section 1 of, and the first schedule to, the Short Titles Act 1896. Due to the repeal of those provisions it is now authorised by section 19(2) of the Interpretation Act 1978.)
- Act of Parliament
- Parliament of England
- Long title: An Act concerning Uses and Wills.
- Citation: 27 Hen. 8. c. 10
- Territorial extent: England and Wales

Dates
- Royal assent: 14 April 1536
- Commencement: 4 February 1536 (Note: Start of session.)
- Repealed: 1 January 1926
Other legislation
Amended by	Statute Law Revision Act 1863; Statute Law Revision Act 1888; Law of Property Act 1922; Law of Property (Amendment) Act 1924
Repealed by	Law of Property Act 1925
Relates to	Statute of Enrolments; Statute of Wills

Status: Repealed

Text of statute as originally enacted

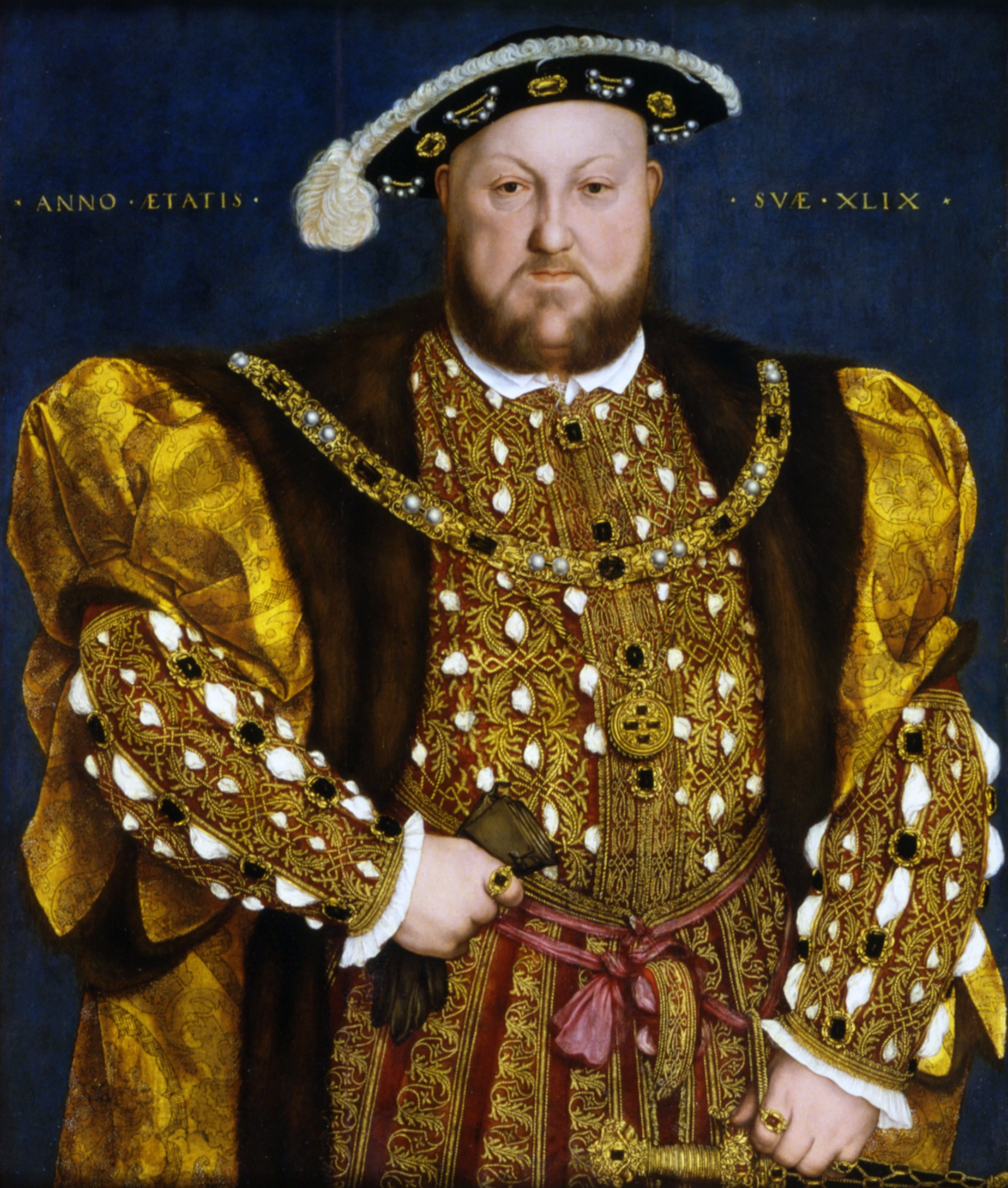
Henry VIII, who devised the Statute as a way of alleviating his financial problems.

The Statute of Uses (27 Hen. 8. c. 10) was an act of the Parliament of England enacted in 1536 that restricted the application of uses in English property law. The statute ended the practice of creating uses in real property by changing the purely equitable title of beneficiaries of a use into absolute ownership with the right of seisin (possession).

The statute was conceived by Henry VIII as a way to rectify his financial problems by simplifying the law of uses, which moved land outside the royal tax revenue (i.e., through royal fees called feudal incidents), traditionally imposed through seisin. At the time, land could not be passed by a will, and when it devolved to the heir upon death was subject to taxes. Hence, the practice evolved of landowners creating a use of the land to enable it to pass to someone other than their legal heir upon their death, or simply to try and reduce the incidence of taxation.

The King's initial attempt in 1529, which would have removed uses almost completely, were stymied in Parliament by members of the House of Commons, many of whom were landowners (who would lose money) and lawyers (who benefited in fees from the confusing law on uses). Academics disagree on how the Commons were brought around, but an eventual set of bills introduced in 1535 was passed by both the Lords and Commons in 1536.

The statute invalidated all uses that did not impose an active duty on trustees, with beneficiaries of the use being held as the legal owners of the land, meaning they had to pay tax. The statute partially led to the Pilgrimage of Grace, and more importantly the development of trusts, but academics disagree as to its effectiveness. While most agree that it was important, with Eric Ives writing that "the effect which its provisions had upon the development of English land law was revolutionary", some say that by allowing uses and devises in certain areas it not only failed to remove the fraudulent element from land law but actively encouraged it.

The statute is still valid law in some provinces of Canada.

== Background ==
The common law of England did not provide for a way to dispose of land held by feudal tenure through wills, only urban land, and instead, uses were applied, which allowed a landowner to give his land to one or more feoffees, to dispose of it or treat it as the original landowner provided. It was viewed with distrust due to the possibility of abuse; Edward Coke wrote that "there were two Inventors of Uses, Fear and Fraud; Fear in Times of Troubles and civil Wars to save their Inheritances from being forfeited; and Fraud to defeat due Debts, lawful Actions, Wards, Escheats, Mortmains etc". With as many as 13 of such feoffees, there was much confusion over the title to land following a lord's death, as evidenced by the case of Sir John Fastolf, which lasted from 1459 to 1476. While this was a problem that needed correcting, the actual motivation of the statute was not to do so, but instead to bolster the finances of Henry VIII. For several years prior to the statute, Henry had been struggling with the need to raise revenue; his royal lands did not provide enough, loans and benevolences would have destroyed his personal popularity; as a result, simply increasing the size of his royal lands was the best option. He turned his attention to land law, arguably the most well developed and complex parts of the common law, and sought to reform it to further his aims. This was well-aimed since it was uses that were destroying his income; the royal revenue was traditionally gathered through seisin, which uses completely ignored.

Two bills were drawn up to be submitted to Parliament in 1529. The first, which took note of "grate trobull, vexacion, and unquietness amonges the kynges suggettes for tytyll of londes, tenements, and other heriditamentes as well by intayle as by uses and forgyng of false evidence", was a radical and "drastic" act bill that would have removed uses completely (unless registered at the Court of King's Bench or Court of Common Pleas) and abolished entails "so that all manner of possessions be in state of fee simple from this day forward for ever", although barons and above were allowed entails; in addition, nobody was allowed to buy such land without the king's license. These measures were to obtain the support of the nobility for the second bill, which gave the King wardship over all the land held by noble orphans. When the orphan came of age and asked for the return of the lands, the king was to have a year's revenue from a third of those lands. While this plan was acceptable to barons and other senior nobles, it required passing by the House of Commons. The large landowners in the Commons felt that it prohibited them from making secure wills, while the lawyers saw it as stripping valuable business away from them by simplifying such cases; with these groups making up the majority of Parliament, these plans came to nothing.

The Parliament of 1532 saw another attempt by Henry to push the bill through, but it again met resistance; while the support of the nobility was valuable, it was useless in the Commons. Henry instead sought to appeal to one of the two opposition groups, and picked the lawyers. Many lawyers admitted that the uses made fraud easy and open, and in addition the lawyers of the common law were jealous of the Court of Chancery's equitable jurisdiction, and sought to strip it away. As a result, Henry decided to bring them over to his side by frightening them, listening to a petition against court procedure and lawyers' fees, and openly musing about putting a clause in the draft bills that would fix the amount they could charge; Holdsworth argues that this was the reason the lawyers chose to ally with Henry, and the reason for the statute's passage. John Bean disagrees, arguing first that many lawyers were landowners, and would have lost more personally than any reduction in fees could have produced, and second that even if they had been convinced, it is unlikely that lawyers made up a majority of the Commons and could have pushed a bill through alone.

== Passage and text ==
In 1535, three draft bills were presented to Parliament concerning uses and wills, along with one concerning Enrolments. It is from these bills that the Statute of Uses and the succeeding Statute of Enrolments (27 Hen. 8. c. 16) came. The three bills on uses suggested two different ways to deal with the problem. The first proposed severely limiting the situation in which uses could arise, with uses having no legal effect apart from that expressed when they were created. No contract or bargain over land could change the use of that land; anyone who suffered from the breach of such a contract had limited remedies in the courts. While this scheme would have prevented most of the evils of uses, it would also have submitted property law to the common law and limited other, beneficial developments; it would also not stop the practice of getting rid of land through a devise, doing nothing to alleviate the King's financial concerns. The second, and more complex suggestion, was contained in the other two bills on uses. This simply removed the idea of an equitable interest in land, leaving only the idea of a legal interest, and left uses, maintaining the elastic and variable nature of property law rather than submitting it to the more-rigid standards of the common law. Parliament eventually accepted the second idea, and the bill was passed in April 1536 as the Statute of Uses (27 Hen.8 c.10). As such, all uses were invalid except for those that imposed an active duty on a trustee, and the beneficiaries of the use were held to be the legal owners, paying tax as a result.

The Statute of Uses also provided that a widow was not to have both jointure and dower as was made possible by the statute.

== Impact and aftermath ==
Most immediately, the statute partially led to the Pilgrimage of Grace, where rebels demanded not only an end to Henry's religious changes but an abandonment of the statute. More importantly, the statute led to the development of the trust as a replacement. While the statute is believed to have led to the abolition of devises (and this was certainly the King's intent), Robert Megarry argues that it failed in doing so. A feoffment "to the use of such person and persons, and of such estate and estates as I shall appoint by my will" produced a use without formally creating a legal estate; the land was held on a lease, rather than freehold. As a result, it was unaffected by the statute of Uses, which banned all other methods. Because of this, Megarry argues that not only did it keep devises intact, it gave it power in the common law as well as under equity. The precise aims of the statute (that the law of property be made more open) was reversed by its impact, which made it far easier to convey property secretly.

Academic assessment of the statute was initially disparaging, with some saying that it added at most "three words to a conveyance", but it was understood to be important by lawyers of the time and in the modern era. Decades later, both Francis Bacon and Edward Coke gave readings on it. In 1879, Maitland wrote that it was a statute "through which not mere coaches and four, but whole judicial processions with javelin-men and trumpeters have passed and re-passed in triumphal procession... It is not a mere Statute of Uselessness but a Statute of Abuses." On the other hand, William Holdsworth called it "perhaps the most important addition that the legislature has ever made to our private law", with Eric Ives writing that "the importance of the Statute of Uses is beyond doubt. The effect its provisions had on English land law development was revolutionary, and from it have grown the crucial doctrines of the trust".

== Repeal ==
Section 6 and 9 and sections 11 to the end of the act were repealed by section 1 of, and the schedule to, the Statute Law Revision Act 1863 (26 & 27 Vict. c. 125), which came into force on 28 July 1863.

The whole act was declared, by section 1 of, and schedule 1 to, the Law of Property (Amendment) Act 1924 (15 & 16 Geo. 5. c. 5), to have been repealed by the Law of Property Act 1922 (12 & 13 Geo. 5. c. 16).

The whole act was repealed by section 207 of, and the seventh schedule to, the Law of Property Act 1925 (15 & 16 Geo. 5. c. 20). Section 1(10) of that act provided that the repeal of the statute did not affect the operation thereof in regard to dealings taking effect before the commencement of that act.

The statute is still valid law in some provinces of Canada.

== See also ==
- Feu
- Quia Emptores (1290)
- Statute of Wills (1540)
- Statute of Frauds (1677)
- Cestui que

== Bibliography ==
- Bean, John Malcolm William (1968). The decline of English feudalism, 1215-1540. Manchester University Press. ISBN 978-0-7190-0294-6.
- Digby, Kenelm (2005). An Introduction To The History Of The Law Of Real Property: With Original Authorities. Lawbook Exchange. ISBN 1-58477-495-9.
- Durfee, E. N. (1918). "The Statute of Uses and Active Trusts". Michigan Law Review. 17 (1). University of Michigan Law School. ISSN 0026-2234.
- Gough, John Wiedhofft (1985). Fundamental law in English constitutional history. Wm. S. Hein Publishing. ISBN 0-8377-2205-5.
- Helewitz, Jeffrey A. (2008). Basic Wills, Trusts, and Estates for Paralegals (4th ed.). Aspen Publishers Online. ISBN 978-0-7355-7119-8.
- Holdsworth, William (1912). "The Political Causes Which Shaped the Statute of Uses". Harvard Law Review. 26 (2). Harvard Law School: 108–127. doi:10.2307/1324477. ISSN 0017-811X. JSTOR 1324477.
- Ives, E.W. (1967). "The Genesis of the Statute of Uses". The English Historical Review. 82 (325). Oxford University Press: 673–697. doi:10.1093/ehr/lxxxii.cccxxv.673. ISSN 0013-8266.
- Megarry, Robert (1941). "The Statute of Uses and the Power to Devise". Cambridge Law Journal. 7 (3). Cambridge University Press: 354–360. doi:10.1017/S000819730012608X. ISSN 0008-1973. S2CID 146438971.
- Mossman, Mary Jane (2004). Property law: cases and commentary (2nd ed.). Emond Montgomery Publication. ISBN 1-55239-121-3.
- Turner, Chas. W. (1916). "Uses before the Statute of Uses". Virginia Law Review. 3 (6). University of Virginia School of Law: 439–444. doi:10.2307/1064133. ISSN 0042-6601. JSTOR 1064133.
- Turner, Ralph V. (1968). The king and his courts; the role of John and Henry III in the administration of justice, 1199-1240. Cornell University Press. ISBN 1-85285-104-X.
