= Appliance =

Appliance may refer to:

== Electrical equipment and machinery ==
- Home appliance, a machine that assists in household functions
  - Small appliance, a portable or semi-portable home appliance
  - Major appliance, or domestic appliance, a large home appliance
- Computer appliance, a dedicated computer device with preconfigured software to perform a specific function
  - Virtual appliance, a pre-configured virtual machine image implementing a computer appliance

== Arts, entertainment, and media ==
- Appliance (band), a British musical group (1995–2003)
- Appliance, a synthetic body part used in prosthetic makeup

== Fire safety ==
- Fire alarm notification appliance, a fire alarm or similar alerting device
- Fire apparatus, a fire engine or fire truck in British English

== Healthcare ==
- Dental braces
- Orthotics
- Prosthesis

== Other uses ==
- Renault Alliance, a compact car often derisively nicknamed the "Appliance"
