= Devise =

Devise may refer to:

- To invent something
- A disposal of real property in a will and testament, or the property itself which has been disposed of
- Devise, Somme, a commune in northern France

== See also ==
- Device (disambiguation)
- Devizes, a town in Wiltshire, England
