= The Device =

- Film poster
- Directed by: Jeremy Berg
- Written by: Jeremy Berg; John Portanova
- Produced by: Matt Medisch; John Portanova; Jeremy Berg
- Starring: Angela DiMarco; David S. Hogan; Kate Alden
- Edited by: Autumn Lisa Mason
- Music by: Berg
- Production companies: October People; Ruthless Pictures
- Distributed by: Image Entertainment
- Release date: September 27, 2014
- Running time: 87 minutes
- Country: United States
- Language: English

The Device is a 2014 American science fiction horror film directed by Jeremy Berg. It stars Angela DiMarco and Kate Alden as sisters who must deal with an alien abduction after one's husband, played by David S. Hogan, becomes obsessed with a strange black ball.

== Plot ==
Still recovering from a family tragedy in the past, two sisters return home to settle their dead mother's affairs. In a nearby forest, they come upon a strange device. The husband of one of the women becomes obsessed with it despite their demands that he get rid of it. After they experience nightmares and other phenomena, they come to believe it may be the result of the device. It is eventually revealed to be of alien origin, and the sisters are abducted.

== Cast ==
- Angela DiMarco as Abby
- David S. Hogan as Calvin
- Kate Alden as Rebecca

== Production ==
Writer-director Berg pitched the concept of the film – a couple who find an object of possibly alien origin – to Ruthless Pictures after they distributed his previous film, The Invoking. Co-writer and producer John Portanova had wanted to write an alien abduction screenplay for a long time, but he experienced writer's block on the second act. Portanova used Berg's ideas to fill in the missing parts. Portanova's own film, Valley of the Sasquatch, was due to start pre-production soon afterward, so they worked to complete production on The Device early. Berg and Portanova credited their already existing interest in alien abduction stories as making it possible to complete film's pre-production so quickly. Shooting took place in Seattle over 12 days. The film's low budget necessitated a limited number of locations. They discussed using a single location but rejected that idea as too limiting. The alien special effects were practical. Berg said he kept the alien in the shadows both for practical reasons and to heighten tension.

== Release ==
The Device premiered on September 27, 2014, at the Local Sightings Film Festival. Image Entertainment released it on DVD in the US on December 16, 2014, and in the UK on March 23, 2015. The DVD features commentary from Tracy Tormé, who wrote Fire in the Sky and Intruders. The filmmakers asked him if he was interested in performing a commentary for their film, as he had never been able to do one for his.

== Reception ==
Ryan Pollard of Starburst rated it 4/10 stars and, while praising the focus on characters instead of aliens, said the film is slow, clichéd, and has a poor payoff. Howard Gorman of Scream magazine rated it 3.5/5 stars and wrote, "If a calculatingly creepy and consuming horror film is what you are in need of then I highly recommend The Device". Jess Hicks of Bloody Disgusting rated it 1.5/5 stars and wrote that the film should have been a short, as too much of the film was taken up with family bickering. Ari Drew of Dread Central rated it 3/5 stars and wrote, "The Device remains a passable, if not sufficiently entertaining film for sci-fi/horror fans who can appreciate a subdued approach to the abduction tale." Mark L. Miller of Ain't It Cool News called it a "a run of the mill movie" that is too clichéd and bland to be scary.
