= Statute of Enrolments =

Act of the Parliament of England

- Act of Parliament
- Parliament of England
- Long title: An Act concerning Inrollments of Bargains and Contracts of Lands and Tenements.
- Citation: 27 Hen. 8. c. 16
- Territorial extent: England and Wales

Dates
- Royal assent: 14 April 1536
- Commencement: 4 February 1536 (Note: Start of session.)
- Repealed: 1 January 1926
Other legislation
Repealed by	Law of Property (Amendment) Act 1924
Relates to	Statute of Uses

Status: Repealed

Text of statute as originally enacted

The Statute of Enrolments (27 Hen. 8. c. 16), also known as the Enrolment of Bargains of Lands, etc. Act 1535, was an act of the Parliament of England that regulated the sale and transfer of land. The statute is commonly considered an addition to the Statute of Uses 27 Hen. 8. c. 10, which was passed within the same Parliament, probably due to an omission in the Statute of Uses. It is thought to have been intended to prevent secret conveyancing, although modern academics instead assert that it was so Henry VIII could keep an accurate record of who his freeholders were. The statute, which only provided for estates "of inheritance and freehold", was easily evaded through the sale of an estate for a limited time period as leasehold, followed by subsequent "release", confirmed in 1621 by Lutwich v Mitton.

== Statute ==
The statute was intended as an addition to the Statute of Uses (27 Hen. 8. c. 10), and was passed in the same session of Parliament. Francis Bacon, for example, referred to it as "but a Proviso" to the Statute of Uses. It provided that after 31 July 1536, no estates of inheritance or freehold was to be transferred based on a bargain and sale unless the sealed and indented deed of the bargain and sale had been enrolled by the courts in Westminster or before the custos rotulorum, two Justices of the Peace and the clerk of the peace of the county, unless it was in those cities or boroughs where this was already required.

It is thought by Charles Isaac Elton that the statute was drafted "as some sort of emergency legislation", which Kaye supports, saying that it was most likely due to some omission in the statute of Uses. However, it is noted by Holdsworth that a draft Henrician bill on Enrolments already existed and was more elaborate that the Statute of Enrolments which was passed instead. He insists that it was "certainly not, as is sometimes stated, a statute passed in a hurry to supply an unforeseen defect in the Statute of Uses", referring to Bacon, who suggests that it was passed as a Proviso in order to prevent the foreseen consequence of the execution of uses leading to the passing of freeholds by parol contract. The common impression, however, is that the statute was intended to prevent secret conveyancing; Oxland instead interprets it as being a way for Henry VIII to keep an accurate record of who his freeholders were at any one time.

The statute was evaded through simply leasing the land for a period of years, rather than freehold. This worked because the statute only applied to estates "of inheritance and freehold", not of leasehold. By leasing the land by bargain and sale for a nominal period (creating a use which is executed in favour of the bargainour immediately by the Statute of Uses), and then granting a "release" relinquishing the lessor's reversionary rights to the lessee, no transfer of freehold land took place and no enrolment was therefore necessary. The so-called "lease and release" is said to have been invented by Sir Francis Moore and came into general use in the early 17th century, confirmed in the case of Lutwich v Mitton in 1621.

== Bibliography ==
- Bacon, F., 'Reading on the Statute of Uses', in The Works of Francis Bacon, J. Spedding (ed.) (1859) vol. VII.
- Holdsworth, W. S. (1923). A History of English Law. Vol. IV. Methuen, London.
- Holdsworth, William (2004). An historical introduction to the land law. The Lawbook Exchange, Ltd. ISBN 1-58477-262-X.
- Kaye, J. M. (1988). "A note on the Statute of Enrolments, 1536". Law Quarterly Review. 104 (1). Sweet & Maxwell. ISSN 0023-933X.
- Oxland, John (1985). Understanding land law. Taylor & Francis. ISBN 0-455-20303-2.
- Yale, D. E. C., "The Revival of Equitable Estates in the Seventeenth Century: An Explanation by Lord Nottingham" (April, 1957) 15(1) Cambridge Law Journal 72.
