= History of the English fiscal system =

The history of the English fiscal system affords the best known example of continuous financial development in terms of both institutions and methods. Although periods of great upheaval occurred from the time of the Norman Conquest to the beginning of the 20th century, the line of connection is almost entirely unbroken. Perhaps, the most revolutionary changes occurred in the 17th century as a result of the Civil War and, later, the Glorious Revolution of 1688; though even then there was no real breach of continuity.

The primitive financial institutions of early England centred on the king's household. In other words, the royal preceded the national economy in importance. Revenue dues collected by the king's agents, rents, or rather returns of produce from land, and special levies for emergencies formed the main elements of the royal income which gradually acquired greater regularity and consistency. There is, however, little or no evidence of what modern governments recognise as financial organisation until the 11th century. The influence exercised from Normandy, which so powerfully affected the English rulers at this time, tended towards the creation of records of revenue claims as well as a central treasury.

Following the Glorious Revolution, control of finance passed more and more to Parliament, which together with the decline of the importance of land rents as a source of income from about the time of the Wars of the Roses led to different forms of taxation.

== Systematising finance ==
With the union of England and Normandy under William the Conqueror, the idea of settled administrative methods became fixed and of special importance in the financial sphere. The systematising spirit, so characteristic of both the Norman and Angevin kings, produced the Exchequer with its judicial and administrative sections and its elaborate forms of account and control.

But even before this, the Domesday Book had carefully recorded all sources of revenue. William I of England initiated a policy which was followed by his successors despite the serious difficulties during the anarchy that subsisted during Stephen's reign. Despite a few vestiges of Old English practices, the Exchequer was primarily a Norman institution.

The picture presented by the Dialogue of the Exchequer (c. 1176) is that of a comprehensive system which secured the receipt of royal income by providing a thorough audit of accounts. Thus the Exchequer sought to increase the crown's revenue..

The history of the English fiscal system affords the best known example of continuous financial development in terms of both institutions and methods. Perhaps the most revolutionary changes occurred in the 17th century as a result of the Civil War and, later, the Glorious Revolution of 1688; though even then there was no real breach of continuity.

== Royal and feudal prerogative ==
Although feudalism was, in one aspect, a powerful instrument for the division of political authority, the particular form in which the Conqueror introduced it to England nevertheless enabled the fiscal rights of the crown to be established more strictly than was possible under previous conditions. First, the actual property of the crown was better administered as each royal manor became subject to the new system of accounting. Secondly, the king's various claims or dues took on a more feudal character, thus receiving stricter legal definition and, thirdly, the higher judicial organisations assisted the expansion of court fees while, above all, the increased authority of the state made the receipts from trade more profitable.

== Sources of revenue in the High Middle Ages ==
Broadly, the sources of revenue fall under the following heads:

1. The royal demesne (i.e. estates managed by the crown), which was distributed throughout England, derived in part from the possessions of the old English kings. These were increased by confiscations following the rebellions during the reigns of the early Norman kings and by the doctrine of escheat which stated that untenanted land reverted to the king (terra regis) under his allodial right. Over fourteen hundred manors appear as royal demesne in the Domesday Book. The royal forests, placed under special forest laws, yielded little revenue except in the form of offender penalties. Rural tenants who held by socage at first paid rent in the form of produce from the land, but this was gradually substituted by cash payments. As the royal demesne was favourable to the growth of towns, the rents derived from urban tenants became a valuable part of the demesne's yield. The revenues of the towns were frequently farmed-out which resulted in the crown receiving from the firma burgi ("farm of the burgh") a fixed and secure annual payment.
2. The "feudal incidents" were feudal rights of the king as the overlord of his tenants-in-chief, which included the claim to knight-service, the three regular feudal aids and payments of feudal relief on succession to a fief, as well as the profits from wardships and marriages, together with escheats forfeitures. The yields from these sources varied with the power of the king and were kept within bounds by the resistance of tenants as shown in the demands of Magna Carta (1215).
3. The administration of justice was a lucrative prerogative of the crown. Suitors had to pay not only for the hearing of their cases but also fees for obtaining writs. Additionally, amercements and compositions increased receipts from this source.
4. Vacant religious offices. As much of the kingdom's land (and therefore its wealth) was held by the church under tenure from the king, the opportunity afforded by keeping sees, abbacies and priories vacant (sede vacante) enabled the king to redirect their revenues to himself, under a doctrine akin to a temporary escheat.
5. Exchequer of the Jews. Until their expulsion in the 13th century, Jews were a highly profitable source of royal revenue. Being under the absolute control of the crown, due to their obligation to obtain royal licence in order to trade as money-lenders in the kingdom, they could be taxed at will either by taking percentages of their property (e.g. in one instance, one-fourth), or by exacting levies for offences, actual or alleged. The establishment of a dedicated Exchequer of the Jews is an indication of their fiscal value.
6. Direct taxation formed an extraordinary or occasional source of revenue. The Danegeld was succeeded by the carucage, and scutage developed from the commutation of the feudal tenure of knight-service from actual military service into cash payments.
7. Customs and dues claimed at the ports which were small in amount but which nevertheless contained the germ of the fully developed customs system of later years.

The history of the English financial system consists mainly of the different flows over time of the above exchequer receipts. For example, a sheriff was bound to account twice yearly at the Exchequer for the royal revenues of his county (the "county farm" or corpus comitatis). During the century and a half that lay between the Norman Conquest and the granting of Magna Carta, this system operated well. Nevertheless, the character of the ruler affected the vigour of administration, both fiscal and general. For instance, the relatively popular Henry I and Henry II secured far better fiscal results than the unpopular and divisive kings Stephen and John, even though the collection of rents and profits from the royal demesne together with feudal and other dues continued as the mainstay of the revenue. However, indications of change are to be found, and the substitution of the carucage (or plough tax) for the Danegeld marks an advance towards direct taxation of land through its produce. Moreover, the introduction of scutage is not only further evidence of the same tendency, but also a step toward the development of a money-based economy to replace the earlier system of payments-in-kind. The tallage (or special levies) imposed on towns in the king's demesne at times of need appear to have been a doubtful exercise of the royal prerogative, albeit belonging scientifically to the same class as the Danegeld and scutage. Perhaps the most important advance made in this period was the beginning of taxation on movable goods, first applied in the Saladin tithe of 1189 later expanding into a general system.

In the reign of King John (1199–1216), the loss of Normandy and his concessions to the demands of the feudal barons set out in Magna Carta rendered financial re-adjustment inevitable. During the long reign of King Henry III(1216–1272), the enforcement by the barons of their privileges granted by Magna Carta acted on the fiscal system by checking the king's arbitrary use of tallages and, as a consequence, encouraged regular assessments of a tax on movables, which became more prevalent over time. The developing concept of necessity to obtain consent of tax-payers before imposition operated to encourage the establishment of bodies representing the various social classes. Indeed, the action of constitutional on fiscal development led to the transition from feudal to parliamentary taxation in its earliest forms.

== Direct taxation ==
Almost at the beginning of the age of parliamentary taxation, one of the older sources of revenue ceased, popular opinion having forced King Edward I to issue in 1290 the Edict of Expulsion which required the Jews to leave the kingdom. It is probable however that owing to the exactions practised on them, Jewish usurers had become progressively less profitable to the Exchequer. Certainly, the kingdom's general resources had so increased that their contribution became less important.

The first effects of parliamentary influence on the fiscal system were the abandonment of tallages on towns and the decline of scutage. Taxes on movables were assessed more systematically so that instead of using varying charges, ranging from one-fourth to one-fortieth, on different classes of goods, the tax was imposed at fixed rates of one-fifteenth on counties and one-tenth on towns (the "fifteenth and tenth" tax). Commissioners were appointed for each county to ensure stricter assessment and were supplied with special instructions as to taxable and exempt goods. This tax remained in force from 1290 to 1334, albeit the proportions imposed varied over time (e.g. an eighth and a fifth were granted to the king by Parliament in 1297, and a tenth and a sixth in 1322).

A more general influence was the growing national economy which led to greater activity on the part of the king as administrator which, in turn, increased the state's need for revenue. Although constitutionally the king was expected to live off his revenues, the force of events made this increasingly impracticable. Therefore, from being uncertain and indirect, taxation, especially that on movables, became certain and direct, absorbing older forms over time. Under medieval conditions, the collection of a general property tax presented serious difficulties in that, unsurprisingly, each local and borough authority tried to keep assessments as low as possible.

England in the 14th century was not ripe for a system that was found hard to make effective even in more advanced societies. Hence, from 1334 onward, the following method of apportionment was employed, i.e. a fifteenth and tenth was taken as affording a definite sum measured by the yield on the ancient valuation. As this gave between £38,000 and £39,000 in the aggregate, the fifteenth and tenth became for the future practically a fiscal expression for a sum of about £39,000, the total to be divided or apportioned between the several counties, cities and boroughs according to their former payments. This settlement, which remained in force for centuries and affected all later direct taxes, had the great advantages of certainty and adaptability. The inhabitants of any particular town knew their total liability and could distribute it amongst themselves in the manner most convenient to themselves. From the royal standpoint, the arrangement was also satisfactory, for the fifteenth and tenth could be multiplied (e.g. in 1352 three-tenths and fifteenths were voted for three years), and supplied a stable revenue for the service of the kingdom. Moreover, the power of regulating the policy of the crown by the bestowal or refusal of grants was naturally agreeable to parliament. Thus, all sections of the nation united in support of the system established in 1334, just before the opening of the Hundred Years' War, in connection with which it was particularly serviceable.

=== Poll tax ===
Akin to the above—at any rate in its nature as a direct impost—was the poll or capitation tax. (Note: A poll tax is a tax of a portioned, fixed amount applied to an individual in accordance with the census (as opposed to a percentage of income). Head taxes were important sources of revenue for many governments from ancient times until the 19th century. The word poll is an English word that once meant "head"—and still does, in some specialised contexts—hence the name poll tax for a per-person tax.) Financial pressure at the close of Edward III's reign (1377) led to the adoption of a tax of fourpence per head on all persons in the kingdom, with mendicants and persons under fourteen years being exempt. This "tallage of groats", which seems to be derived by analogy from the hearth money for Peter's Pence, was followed by the graduated poll taxes of 1379 and 1380, the former ranging in scale from ten marks (£6 13s. 4d.) imposed on royal dukes and viscounts, to six marks on earls, bishops and abbots down to three on barons and to the groat or fourpence on all other persons over sixteen years of age.

It proved to be unproductive, only half the estimated yield of £50,000 being obtained. Indeed, the tax of 1380 varied within narrower limits—from twenty shillings to fourpence (or sixty groats to three), with the proviso that the strong should aid the weak. However, this particular tax is chiefly memorable as the occasion that may have been the real causes of the great Peasants' Revolt of 1381.

This unlucky association sealed the fate of the poll tax as a fiscal expedient. It was abandoned, with one exception, for nearly three hundred years, its occasional employment in the 17th century not resulting in its permanent revival. Apart from special circumstances, it is plain that the fifteenth and tenth was better suited than the poll tax for the purpose of English finance. The machinery for collection was ready for the former, while special agents had to gather the latter, even from the poorest classes. In fact, the episode of the poll taxes may be regarded as a fortunately unsuccessful attempt to relieve the propertied classes at the expense of the peasants and poorer burghers. Failure in this respect helped in the maintenance of the settlement of direct taxation devised in 1334.

== Indirect taxation ==
Parallel with the evolution of direct taxation, but decidedly lagging behind, is the progress of indirect taxation. As already mentioned, the right of levying dues on goods entering or leaving English ports belonged from very early times to the king. Whether this power was, in its origin, due to the protection afforded to traders and thus a kind of insurance, or the result of the royal prerogative of pre-emption is immaterial for finance. What is established is that the prisage of wine or levy of one cask in ten, and the taking of one-fifteenth or one-tenth of other commodities was in force. Attempts to impose additional dues were forbidden by Article 41 of Magna Carta which recognised the ancient and just customs.

One of the earliest effects of parliamentary influence is manifested in the establishment of duties on wool, woolfells and leather by the first parliament of Edward I. After efforts by the king to gather increased duties, the Confirmation of the Charter (1297) forbade any increases on the amounts fixed in 1275, which were henceforth known as the ancient customs.

Another attempt was made to obtain a higher scale of duties by arrangement with merchants. Foreign traders consented to the royal proposals, which comprised duties on wine, wool, hides and wax, plus a general tax of 1 1/4% on all imports and exports. Thus, in addition to the old custom of half a mark (6s. 8d.) per sack of wool and each three hundred woolfells, as well as one mark (13s. 4d.) per last or load of leather, foreign merchants paid an extra duty (or surtax) of 50% and also 2s. per tun of wine, the so-called butlerage.

The privileges laid down in the Carta Mercatoria (1303) were probably granted conditionally on the acceptance of these enhanced dues. English merchants, however, successfully resisted them so that the old prisage of wine remained unchanged, at least for them. Despite parliamentary opposition on the ground that they amounted to an infringement of the Great Charter, the new customs remained in force. After being suspended in 1311, they were revived in 1322, confirmed by royal authority in 1328, and finally sanctioned by parliament in the Statute of the Staple (1353). They therefore formed part of the permanent crown revenues from the ports and, together with other, older, customs, became the basis for further development.

Just as the old direct taxes were supplemented by, and then absorbed into, the general taxation on movables, so customs, in the strict sense, were followed by subsidies or parliamentary grants. One great source of English wealth in the 14th century was the export of a peculiarly fine wool. Thus, the political circumstances of Edward III's time suggested its manipulation for purposes of both policy and revenue. Sometimes in order to influence the towns of Flanders, the export of wool was absolutely prohibited; at others, varying export duties were imposed not only on wool, but also skins and leather. In the reign's early years, these were settled in agreement with merchant classes.

These subsidies were first imposed in 1340, being henceforward granted despite frequent complaints. Thus, in 1348, Parliament objected to an export duty of £2 per sack on wool on the ground that it was in fact a tax on landowners who, as a consequence, received lower prices for their wool. Bargains between the king and merchants were forbidden and were therefore brought under parliamentary control by statutes passed in 1362 and 1371. In 1347, besides special duties on wool, imposts on wine and general goods were increased by agreement at a charge of 2s. per tun on the former and 2 1/2% on the latter. Indeed, between 1371 and 1376, these were established as grants under the names Tunnage and Poundage, older dues being left intact.

== The clergy ==
The clergy occupied a peculiar position in that it still claimed the privilege of self-taxation so that convocation rather than Parliament voted the tenths imposed on its property. In some instances, far heavier charges (e.g. one third in 1296) were decreed by the king, despite which such taxation became less productive during the 14th century. However, by the close of the reign of Richard II, the results of the transition from feudalism to a parliamentary constitution were almost complete. As regards finance, the most important of these were:

1. The disappearance or reduction of unimportant feudal dues. The fact that this change occurred at a relatively early date is of special significance for English development.
2. The royal demesne, though it had not yet suffered the losses that later grants were to inflict, had also lost some of its value.
3. In compensation, direct taxation on property became a ready means of supplying the growing requirements of the administration, the mode of levy being reduced to a well-recognized form, unsatisfactory experiments such as the poll tax having been withdrawn.
4. The growth of import and export duties through the old and new customs plus subsidies furnished a large part of the requisite funds. In fact, in a little over three hundred years and without violence, the constituent parts of public income had been completely altered in relative value and organisation.

== Further forms of tax raising ==
The Lancastrian era, extending over two-thirds of the 15th century (1399–1471), is noticeable for introducing new forms of direct taxation. The standard tax, the fifteenth and tenth, was failing to meet changing conditions in that, as towns decayed, further allowances had to be given amounting to over 15% (£6,000), which, with other deductions, lowered the yield from fifteenths and tenths to £31,000. To supplement this, a 5% land tax affecting only large land owners was introduced in 1404, a lower rate of 1 2/3% being applied to the less wealthy in 1411. A house tax made its appearance in 1428 while taxes on knights' fees and other freeholds were also tried. In 1435 and 1450, a graduated income tax was employed. The minimum rate, 2 1/2%, applied to incomes under £100 (or under £20 in the tax of 1450) rising to 10% on higher incomes, thus evidencing the need for greater revenue. At this time, such methods showed a disposition to adopt foreign models, particularly those of France and Italy.

As to indirect taxation, receipts at first seemed to decline so that subsidies were granted for specified fixed terms, albeit that the victory of Agincourt gained a life grant for Henry V. After the enthronement of Edward IV, however, the tenth was literally taken up and voted (1472) by Parliament as a special military provision only. However, it failed to raise the necessary revenue, thus forcing the King to fall back on older forms of grant.

Extra taxes on aliens were levied under both Lancastrian and Yorkist rulers but with little profit. The most original contribution of Edward IV's reign to fiscal policy was that of benevolences or payments by wealthy subjects of sums requested by the king. Voluntary in form, these were, in fact, compulsory, and later became one of the great grievances against which Parliament had to struggle.

Broader financial issues marked the Tudor period as the era of national monarchies arrived, necessitating the maintenance of greater military and naval forces, as well as more costly machineries of administration. Both external and fiscal policy were affected by the set of ideas that developed into mercantilism while the state of finance reflected the monarch's personal character, particularly in the 16th century, so that decided contrasts could be found. For example, Henry VII carried his desire to replenish the royal treasury depleted by the Wars of the Roses to the point of establishing a "reign of fiscal terror", through the rigid enforcement of feudal incidents rather than appeals for parliamentary aids, and the establishment of a system of "Chamber Finance" run by the staff of his Privy Chamber mirroring the functioning of the slow and inefficient Exchequer. He was followed by the lavish prodigality of Henry VIII while Elizabeth's financial policy was very different from that of either. In addition, the desire for a vigorous foreign policy, the hope of encouraging native industry and the sentiment of retaliation against the trade regulations of other countries interfered with the strict aim of earlier times, namely the obtaining of the largest possible yields.

The whole public economy was regarded as existing only for the furtherance of national power. It is this more complex policy together with new influences such as the discovery of America, the Renaissance and the Reformation that gives special interest to the financial problems of the sixteenth century.

The first head of public income at the disposal of the sovereign was that of the crown lands. Although these were diminished over time by grants to the King's relatives and favourites, they were simultaneously built up via resumptions and forfeitures. On the whole, though, losses and gains were thought to be in balance by the close of the 14th century. Crown lands were, however, an inelastic form of revenue, and their great impoverishment—begun in the 15th century by the Lancastrian kings, (in particular, Henry VI)—was caused through expenditure pressures, profligacy and wholesale plunder by officials.

Edward IV failed to capitalise on the many forfeited estates reverting to the crown during the Wars of the Roses of the 15th century, so that the main opportunity for aggrandizement was afforded by the dissolution of the monasteries and guilds under Henry VIII. As a result, the great mass of property passing into royal possession was in part assigned to nobles and officials, the remainder being distributed during his children's reigns. Thus, the dwindling importance of land and rents to the public revenue continued. Similarly, feudal dues also became subordinate notwithstanding occasional attempts rigorously to enforce them. The degree of personal monarchy exercised by the Tudors, depending as it did on popular support, therefore tended to encourage the collection of dues other than taxation. Similarly restrained was the use of the old right of purveyance, finally abolished in 1660.

In the 16th century, the obtaining of additional revenue from crown lands and the royal prerogative was exploited to the full. These were now, however, far less profitable, the prevailing political and social conditions increasingly pointing to the need for direct taxation to become the principal source of revenue raising. Among the many calls for further revenue, the chief included the need to maintain the ever-expanding machinery of state and price rises caused by growing supplies of precious metals, the effects of which extended into the 17th century.

One form of direct taxation remained from Edward III's reign. Fifteenths and tenths continued to be voted in while attempts to introduce new methods failed. In 1488 a military grant framed on the model of the abortive tax of 1472 yielded only a little over one third of the estimate (£27,000 out of £75,000), the unsatisfactory result preventing further experiments during Henry VII's reign. The foreign policy of Henry VIII, particularly his French expedition with its enormous outlay, accounts for the graduated capitation tax of 1513, which, despite anticipation, yielded even less than the tax of 1488 (£50,000 instead of £160,000). But these failures cleared the way for a more effective form of direct impost, a general tax (1514) on land and goods which was at first modest: 2 1/2%. However, it was soon raised to 4s. in the pound on land and 2s. 8d. in the pound on goods, a scale evidently devised with reference to the older fifteenth and tenth, which henceforth became subordinate.

The subsidy became the established mode of grant under both Tudors and Stuarts, though by degrees it underwent a change similar to that of its predecessor. Under the taxing statutes, elaborate provisions were made for its assessment and collection in order to secure the greatest possible return. However, old habits proved too strong and the subsidy "slipped into the same groove as that of the fifteenth and tenth, in practice becoming a grant of about the same amount as the yield of the preceding subsidy" (Dowell).

As a result, each subsidy was approximately £100,000 in the middle of the 16th century, but had fallen to only £80,000 by its close. The parallel vote of the clergy in convocation (which, after 1533, was confirmed by Parliament) amounted to £20,000. Usually, Parliament voted a number of fifteenths and tenths plus subsidies, e.g. Elizabeth's first Parliament voted her two fifteenths and tenths plus a subsidy, or, taking the usual values, £160,000. At times of war, such as the attempted invasion by the Spanish Armada, however, votes were enlarged by granting further fifteenths, tenths and subsidies. The history of the subsidy is instructive as regards its tendency to become inelastic over time, approximating to a fixed sum only. Thus, it followed the path of later medieval taxation forming the—albeit undesigned—model for subsequent land and property taxes.

Under the Tudors, port duties—the subsidies on wool, hides and leather, plus tunnage at 3s., and poundage at 5%—were granted to each sovereign for life. These, together with the hereditary customs, supplied considerable revenue for crown's use and no better indication of the increased power and popularity of the monarchy can be found than during this era, the contrast with the suspicious, grudging attitudes of the Plantagenet and Lancastrian parliaments signifying a change in the national sentiment. However, increasing the duty on Malmsey wine (1490) had a retaliatory rather than a fiscal aim, being directed against the Venetians who had previously imposed restrictions on English trade. For the same reason, increases were later imposed on French wine in particular.

Although restrictions on imports and exports as well as hostile measures against foreign merchants were matters of economic rather than financial policy, they had the indirect effect of increasing the control exercised at the ports. However, the loss of Calais (1558) dislocated the system of the staple by cutting off a vital centre of customs revenue. It may also have contributed to the changed method of valuing duty. Thus, in 1558, fixed valuations were, for the first time, substituted and set down in a book of rates. More stringent reforms and regulations followed, in particular against smuggling and fraud by corrupt officials. Despite such reforms, however, the cost of collection remained unduly high throughout the Tudor period.

As in the 14th century, the subsidy had followed both old and new customs. Similarly in the 16th century, impositions levied by royal prerogative also supplemented the parliamentary subsidy, although their principal employment occurred during the following century. A further, significant indication of the future of indirect taxation was furnished by grants of monopolies to inventors, producers and traders. When these affected important commodities, they operated in the same way as taxes farmed out to collectors and, although crown profits therefrom were small, they effectively enhanced prices and excited discontent, promise of redress finally taking place after the hostile debate of 1601.

It may fairly be said that one of the greatest struggles between the Stuart kings and Parliament centred round financial policy. It is beyond dispute that taxation was one sphere of conflict and, from the accession of James I (1603) to the start of the Civil War (1642), the legal basis of indirect taxation was tested for port duties in the Case of Impositions (the John Bates case), whilst that of direct taxation was considered in the even more famous Ship Money case, forever associated with John Hampden. Similarly, Parliament also debated impositions, monopolies, votes of subsidies and the proper application of funds therefrom as well as other related matters. Despite this, however, the overall system showed signs of expanding and adapting to the growing needs of the state.

The direct grants of the parliaments of James I far exceeded those of earlier reigns—for example, in 1606 fifteenths and tenths, three lay and four clerical subsidies—although efforts to extend other sources of revenue by exercising the royal prerogative naturally reacted on this spirit of liberality. The last fifteenth and tenth was voted in 1624, from which date this old-established form disappeared leaving the subsidy only. In spite of Charles I's high-handed policy, five subsidies were voted after the Petition of Right had been accepted, and even the Long Parliament made similar grants. At or near the outbreak of the Civil War, it also granted the king a graduated capitation tax.

Other modes of direct taxation were used without parliamentary sanction. The collection of antiquated feudal dues was enforced through the special courts (particularly the Star Chamber) with a rigour long unknown. James had tried the French device of a tariff of honours and he and his son both employed the benevolence until the Petition of Right made such a levy illegal. But by far the most serious innovation was the collection of Ship Money, a course forced on Charles by his determination to rule without Parliament. These writs embodied the ultimate expression of the ingenuity of the King's advisers in the invention of means to enable him to do so. The first writs secured over £100,000, and were followed by five further issues (1634–1639) bringing in an average return of £200,000 or about three lay subsidies. Like the benevolence, Ship Money was declared to be illegal (1641).

The contest respecting monopolies settled by Elizabeth's withdrawal was revived under James, finally being stopped by the Statute of Monopolies (1624) which declared such grants to be utterly void. Certain exceptions (as in the case of the soapboiles) permitted the raising of revenue by what was, in fact, a rudimentary excise and plans for a general excise were also discussed, especially as a substitute for feudal dues, though these were not reduced in practice. In the early part of the 17th century, customs steadily increased from £127,000 in 1604 to nearly £500,000 in 1641 due to the growth of English trade, the adoption of new books of rates—1608 and 1635—the fixing of higher valuations and also the inclusion of new commodities, in particular, wine, currants (the subject of controversy in Bates' case) tobacco and sugar.

One development was the adoption of the farming system on a larger scale, an evident imitation from France. Distinctions were made between the great, the petty and the sugar farms, and opportunities for gain were afforded to the relevant officials. Constitutionally, the life grant of subsidies, voted in accordance with Tudor usage to James, was withheld from Charles by Parliament because of his overbearing policies. However, between 1628 and 1640, all customs revenue was raised by the use of the prerogative only, an avenue that was finally closed by The Tunnage and Poundage Act 1641 which made such extra-parliamentary customs illegal.

In short, financial progress from the Conquest to the crisis of the Great Rebellion was marked by an almost complete shift of revenue-raising methods. The King had ceased to maintain himself and the royal demesne and the prerogative rights included in feudalism had become totally subordinate, being replaced by direct and indirect taxation.

== The Civil War and the Commonwealth ==
A new departure in English financial history occurred during the Civil War and the Commonwealth when most feudal systems were abandoned. Thus, this period, together with the Interregnum (1649–1660) may be regarded as marking a new watershed. At the beginning of the struggle, both sides were forced to rely on voluntary contributions. Plate and ornaments were melted down whilst useful commodities were furnished by the adherents of both king and parliament respectively. However, despite the voting in of subsidies and a poll tax, imports were levied only with difficulty so that new methods of collection became necessary. Therefore, in marked contrast to the lax management of former subsidies, direct taxation was, from now on, assessed monthly at a rate fixed from time to time and gathered under strict regulations, thus becoming more systematic and equitable than previously.

Despite its origin, this assessment became the model for a later property tax. Its yield for the whole period exceeded £32,000,000 thus proving its importance. Minor contrivances, e.g. the weekly meal tax, indicate various parliamentary difficulties, but were otherwise unimportant. Owing to its control of the sea and the principal ports, Parliament was also able to command customs revenue where it again remodelled duties, abolishing the wool subsidy and readjusting general customs by a new book of rates. A more extensive tariff was adopted in 1656, and various restrictions in harmony with mercantilist ideas of the time were enforced, French wines, silk and wool being exempted from 1649 to 1656.

Far more revolutionary in its effects was the introduction of the excise or inland duties on goods, a step which Elizabeth, James I and Charles I had hesitated to take. Beginning (1643) with duties on ale, beer and spirits, it was soon extended to meat, salt and various textiles. Meat and domestic salt were relieved in 1647, and the taxation became definitely established under the administration of commissioners appointed for the purpose. Powers to allow collection by farmers were granted, a bid for both excise and customs amounting to £1,100,000 in 1657. Confiscations of church and royalist lands, feudal charges and special collections helped to make up the total of £83,000,000 raised during the nineteen years of the revolution.

Another change was the removal of the Exchequer to Oxford, which nevertheless left the real fiscal machinery at the disposal of those committees that directed the affairs of Parliament. Under Cromwell the Exchequer was re-established (1654) in a form suited for such financial change, the office of Treasurer being placed in the hands of commissioners.

== The Restoration and beyond ==
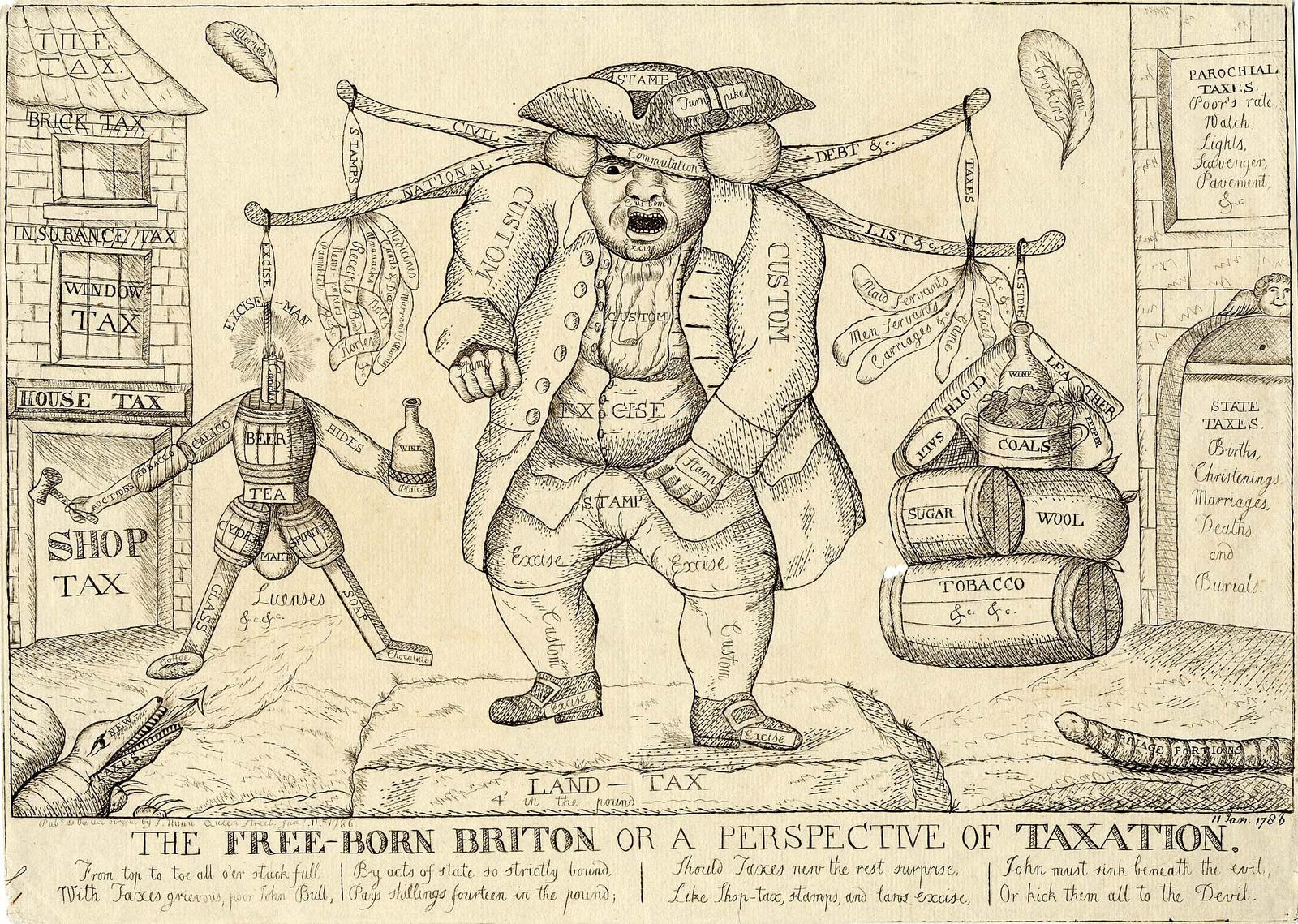
'The free-born Briton or a perspective of taxation', a satirical print of 1786: an angry John Bull carries a double yoke loaded up with items subject to taxes, customs, excise or stamp duties. The land he walks on is taxed, as is the nearby house, while the church proffers parochial taxes and state taxes.

A complete reconstruction of the revenue system became necessary during the Restoration. The feudal tenures and dues, with the prerogative rights of purveyance and pre-emption, could not be restored and careful inquiry showed that whilst, before the Civil War, the king's annual revenue amounted to just under £900,000, the needs of the restored monarchy would now be about £1,200,000 per annum. The commons therefore set about raising such a sum, an hereditary excise on beer and ale being voted in as compensation for the loss of old, feudal dues, whilst temporary excises on spirits, vinegar, coffee, chocolate and tea were put in place.

All differences between old and new customs and subsidies had disappeared under the Commonwealth. The General or Great Statute (1660) provided a scale of duties, 5% on imports and exports, with special duties on wines and woollen cloths accompanied by a new book of rates. A house tax levied after the French pattern on each hearth, was introduced and established in 1662. Poll taxes were used as an extraordinary resource, as were the last subsidies, voted in 1663, and then forever abandoned. Licences on retailers and fees on law proceedings were further aids to revenue, which, in the later years of Charles II, and in the short reign of his successor, was kept up to the level of increasing expenditure, but only with difficulty.

The Commonwealth assessments were revived on several occasions, indirect taxation being made more rigorous by the imposition of extra duties on brandy, tobacco and sugar as well as French linens and silks. One major development was the placing of customs (1670) and excise (1683) in the hands of special commissioners, as opposed to the former system of farming them out to private collectors. This more modern approach was further evidenced by the greater care taken with customs' administration. Amongst expert officials Dudley North, was the most distinguished commissioner of customs. In this period, too, the beginning of the public debt may be found in the Stop of the Exchequer of 1672, and its indefinite deferral of what had originally been short-term financed obligations due to bankers.

The Revolution of 1688 may be regarded in both constitutional and financial terms as the completion of the work of the Long Parliament. In the latter respect its chief effects were:

1. The transfer of the administration of finances from the king's nominees to officials under parliamentary control
2. The consequent application of revenue to the purposes designated by parliamentary appropriation
3. The rapid expansion of various forms of revenue, particularly indirect taxation
4. The rise and growth of the national debt, combined with the creation of an effective banking system. (The greater part of the 18th century was occupied with the working out of these results.)

The government of William III faced the expense of war whilst simultaneously needing to allay discontent at home. As a preliminary to settling the necessary revenue, a return was prepared, showing tax receipts of £1,100,000 and £1,800,000 during peace and wartime respectively. Parliament believed that £1,200,000 per annum would suffice for the kingdom's ordinary requirements but nevertheless introduced the Civil List, assigning £600,000 for certain fixed payments, leaving the remainder for other state needs. As "hearth money" had proved extremely unpopular, it was abolished, despite its yield of £170,000. Additionally, further excise duties were voted in for the duration of William and Mary's lifetimes, plus further customs duties, albeit that the latter were for a limited term only. However, these revenues were still totally insufficient to meet the pressures of war and new taxes were therefore created, older forms being revived.

A series of poll and capitation taxes was imposed between 1689 and 1698 which were thereafter abandoned, being as unpopular as 'hearth money'. In 1688, monthly assessment were introduced, followed by income tax, followed by twelve-monthly assessments in 1690 and 1691. The way was thus prepared for the property tax of 1692, imposing a rate of 4s. in the pound on real estate, offices and personal property. However, the old difficulties of collection turned it mainly into a land tax, by which name it became generally known. The 4s. rate brought in £1,922,712, a return which declined in later years. To meet the shortfall, therefore, a fixed quota of nearly half a million (a 1s. rate) was adopted in 1697, the amount being apportioned in specified sums to towns and counties, its framework remaining substantially the same until 1798, the year of Pitt's redemption scheme. In 1696, houses were taxed at 2s. each, higher rates being applied to extra windows. Thus, the beginning of the window tax, licences on pedlars and a temporary tax on company stocks completed these imposts.

Following Holland's example, stamp duties were adopted in 1694, being extended in 1698 and large amounts were added to the excise. Breweries and distilleries were placed under charge and important commodities such as salt, coal, malt, leather and glass were included as taxable articles, the two latter being later removed. Similarly, customs rates were also increased. In 1698 the general 5% duty was raised to 10%. French goods became liable to surtaxes, first at 25%, then 50%, whilst goods from other countries were charged at a lesser amount. Moreover, spirits, wines, tea and coffee were taxed at special rates.

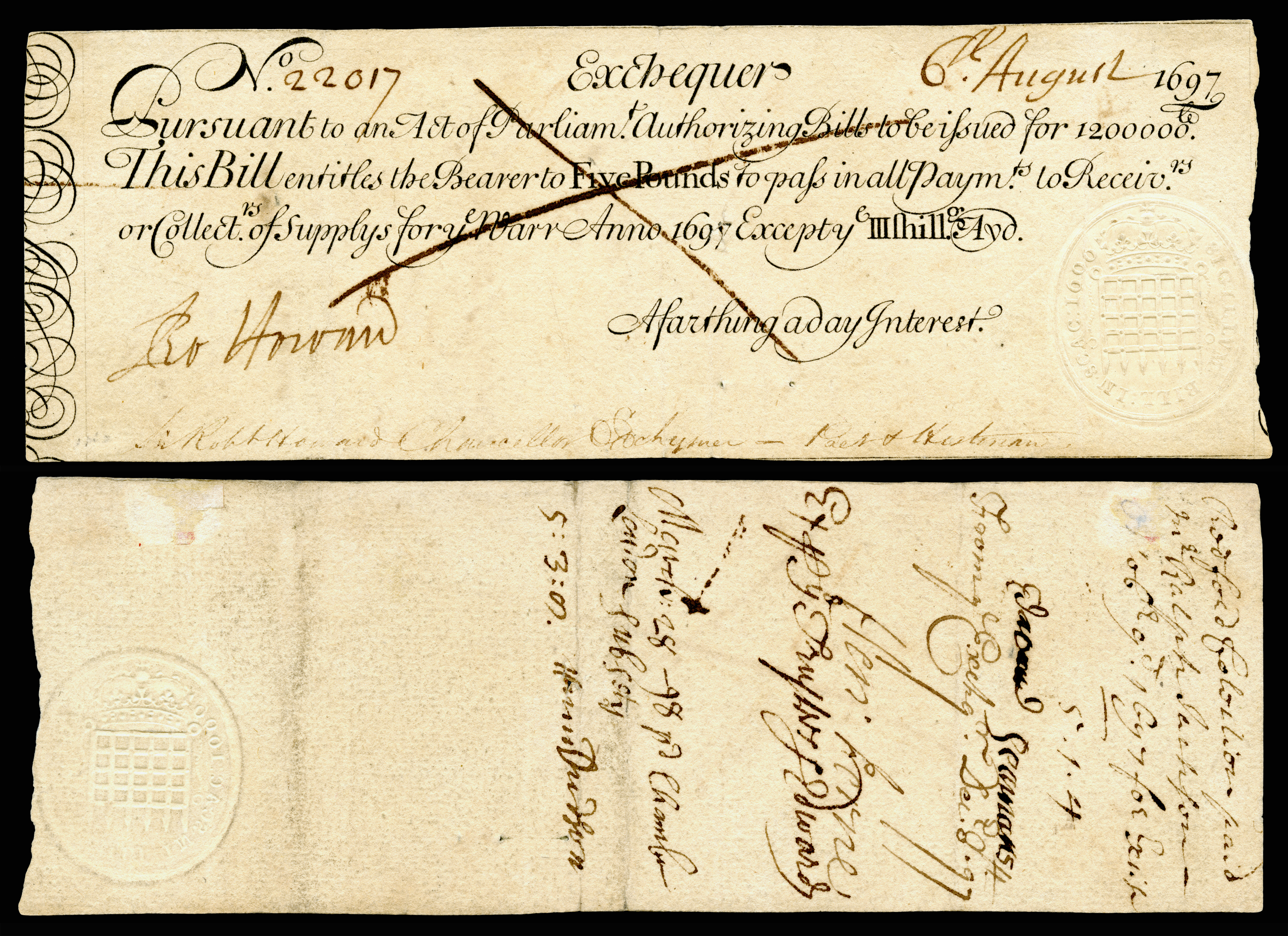
Kingdom of England Exchequer note-5 Pounds (1697), issued during the reign of William III

The expansion of the fiscal system may be best realised from the fact that, during the comparatively short reign of William III (1689–1702), the land tax produced £19,200,000, customs raising £13,296,000, and excise £13,650,000, or approximately £46 million when added together. In the last year of the reign, returns from these taxes were respectively—land tax (at 2s.), £990,000, customs £1,540,000, excise £986,000, or a total exceeding £3.5 million. The removal of regular export duty applied to domestic woollen manufactures and corn only, both cases additionally being due to special reasons of policy.

Quite as remarkable as the growth of revenue was the sudden appearance of public loans. In earlier periods, a ruler accumulated treasure (Henry VII left £1,800,000) or pledged jewels or customs revenue or, occasionally, his friends to repay his loans. Edward III's dealings with Florentine bankers are well known, but it was only after the Revolution that the two conditions essential for a permanent, public debt were realised:

1. The responsibility of the government to the people
2. An effective market for floating capital.

At the close of war in 1697, a debt of £21.5 million had been incurred, of which over £16 million was still owed at William III's death. Connected with the public debt at that time was the foundation of the Bank of England which increasingly became the agent for dealing with the state's revenue and expenditure, although the Exchequer continued to exist until 1834 as a real, albeit antiquated, institution. Thus it is clear that, by the end of the 17th century, new influences dating from the Civil War brought into being all elements of the modern financial system. Expenditure, revenue, borrowing and loans essentially developed into their present-day form. Increases in amounts plus procedural refinements combined with improved views on public policy were the only changes that occurred thereafter.

Broadly speaking, the 18th and 19th centuries exhibit several distinct financial periods. During the 90 years from the death of William III (1702) to the outbreak of the Revolutionary War with France (1793), there were four wars covering nearly 35 years. The long, peaceful administration of Walpole can be contrasted with the shorter intervals of peace following each contest. From the beginning of the war with the French Republic to the Battle of Waterloo there was an almost unbroken twenty years of war. The following forty years' peace ended with the Crimean War (1854–56), whilst a further forty years' peace ended with the Second Boer War (1899–1902). During this time, the older form of mercantilism gave way to protectionism which, in turn, led to the gradual adoption of free trade. During each period of war, taxation (particularly indirect taxation) and debt increased. Financial reform was synonymous with peace and, among the great financial ministers, Walpole, the younger Pitt, Peel and Gladstone were conspicuous, while Huskisson's services in the kindred field of economic policy deserve special notice.

By examining the sources of revenue in order, it is possible to identify the changes made in subsequent years.

1. The land tax, established on a definite basis in 1692, was the great 18th century form of direct taxation. Varying in rate from 1s. (in 1731) to 4s. (in most war years), Pitt, in 1798, converted it into a redeemable charge on the lands of each parish, thus reducing it from £1,911,000 in 1798 to £730,000 in 1907–1908. Moreover, major increases in other heads impaired its fiscal value.
2. Excise duty grew rapidly in the 18th century. Most articles of common consumption were permanently taxed, although Adam Smith unreservedly condemned those on soap, salt, candles and leather. In 1739, excise duties brought in £3 million, a sum that subsequently rose to £10 million, continued expansion being due both to the wider area covered and the country's increasing consumption.
3. Customs were equally serviceable, increased duties being even more considerable. The general 10% rate of 1698 became 15% in 1704, a fourth 5% was imposed in 1748 and, in 1759, general duties were raised to 25%. Coincidentally, customs duties on special articles such as tea were also increased. Indeed, the American War of Independence produced a further 10% increase plus special extra duties on tobacco and sugar. Indeed, by 1784 customs revenue had risen to over £3 million.

However, two further matters must be taken into account:

1. The extreme rigour of duties and prohibitions aimed chiefly against French trade; and
2. The absence of care in estimating the point of maximum productiveness for each duty.

Swift's famous saying that, in the arithmetic of customs, two and two sometimes made only one, is well exemplified in England at this time. Smugglers were responsible for the loss of much of the country's foreign trade revenue despite the fact that efforts at reform were not altogether wanting. Walpole made several useful adjustments by abolishing general duties on exports plus several on imported raw materials such as silk, beaver, indigo and colonial timber. His most ambitious scheme for the warehousing of wine and tobacco in order to relieve exporters failed, however, because of the popular belief that it was the forerunner of a general excise. Nevertheless, his reduction of land tax together with his earlier funding plan deserve notice, as does his determination to preserve peace, which was also assisted by his fiscal reforms.

Pitt's administration from 1783 to 1792 marks another period of improvement. The consolidation of the customs laws (1787), the reduction of tea duty to nearly one-tenth of its former amount, the conclusion of a liberal commercial treaty with France and the attempted trade arrangement with Ireland tend to show that Pitt would have anticipated many of the free trade measures of later years had it been his lot to enjoy ten more years of peaceful administration.

One financial problem which excited interest and even alarm, however, was the rapidly increasing public debt. Each war gave rise to greater additions whilst intervals of peace showed little diminution, its amount rising from £16 million in 1702 to £53 million at the time of the Treaty of Utrecht (1713). In 1748 it reached £78 million and, at the close of the Seven Years' War, it stood at £137 million, only to exceed £238 million by the time the American colonies became independent. Apprehension of national bankruptcy led to the adoption of the device of a sinking fund but, in this instance, Pitt's usual sagacity failed him. The influence of Richard Price's theory induced the policy of assigning special sums for debt reduction without regard to the fundamental need to maintain a real surplus.

== Income tax ==
The revolutionary and Napoleonic Wars mark an important stage in English finance. The national resources were strained to the utmost, and the whip and spur of taxation was used on all classes. In the earlier years of struggle, the expedient of borrowing enabled the government to avoid the more oppressive forms of charge but, as time passed, every possible expedient was brought into play. The class of taxes organised during peacetime had been those on houses, carriages, servants, horses, plate, etc., these being raised by successive steps of 10% each until, in 1798, their total charge was increased threefold—four or fivefold for the rich—under the plan of a "triple assessment".

The comparative failure of this scheme (which did not produce the estimated yield of £4.5 million) prepared the way for the most important development of all—the introduction of income tax in 1798. Though a development of the triple assessment, income tax was also connected with the permanent settlement of land tax as a redeemable charge. Indeed, it is possible to trace the progress of direct taxation from the scutage of Norman times through to the fifteenth and tenth, the Tudor subsidies, the Commonwealth monthly assessments and the 18th century land tax, to the income tax as applied by Pitt which, after an interval of disuse, was revived by Peel in 1842. However, its immediate yield was rather less than was expected—£6 million out of £7.5 million. Nevertheless, by altering the mode of assessment from that of a general declaration to returns under several schedules, the tax became, at first 5%, and afterwards at 10%, the most valuable part of the revenue. In 1815 it contributed 22% of total receipts—i.e. £14,600 million out of £67 million—and, had it been employed at the beginning of the war, it would almost certainly have obviated much of the government's financial difficulties.

The window tax, which continued throughout the 18th century, had been supplemented during the American War by a tax on inhabited houses (one of Adam Smith's suggestions). Again, probate duty had been gradually raised during the 18th century, the legacy duty being introduced in 1780, which was moderate and did not affect land. Though direct and quasi-direct taxes had been dramatically increased, their growth was eclipsed by that of excise and customs. With each succeeding year of war, further articles attracted duty whilst tax rates were raised.

The maxim, said to have guided financiers in other countries, to the effect that wherever you see an object, tax it, fairly expressed the guiding policy of the early 19th century. Eatables, liquors, the materials of industry, manufactures, and commercial transactions had in to pay toll in almost all their forms. For example, salt attracted 15s. per bushel, sugar 30s. per cwt., beer 10s. per barrel (with 4s. 5d. per bushel on malt plus a hop duty), tea 96% ad valorem. Timber, cotton, raw silk, hemp and bar iron were also taxed as were leather, soap, glass, candles, paper and starch.

Despite the need for revenue, many customs duties were framed on protection thereby producing relatively small returns. For example, import duty on salt in 1815 produced £547, as against £1,616,124 from excise; pill-boxes brought in 18s. 10d., saltpetre 2d., with 1d. for the war duties. The course of war taxation was marked by varied experiments. Duties were raised, lowered and raised again, or given some new form in an effort to raise more revenue. Some duties, i.e. that on gloves, were abandoned as unproductive but the conclusion is irresistible in that the financial system generally suffered from over-complication and absence of principle. In the period of his peace administration, Pitt was prepared to follow the teaching of The Wealth of Nations. However, the strain of war forced him and his successors to employ whatever heads of taxation were likely to bring in funds without violating popular prejudices. Along with taxation, debt increased. For the first ten years additions averaged £27,000,000 per annum, bringing the total to over £500,000,000.

By the close of the war in 1815, the total reached over £875 million, somewhat smaller annual increases resulting from the adoption of more effective taxes, particularly income tax. Increasing trade levels also helped and the import of articles such as tea advanced in proportion with the growing population. Thus, tea duty of 96% yielded no less than £3,591,000 in 1815. It is, however, true that by that time, the tax system had reached its limit. Further extension (except by direct property confiscation) was hardly possible so that the war closed victoriously at the moment when prolongation seemed unendurable.

A particular aspect of the English financial system is its relation to the organisation of the finance of territories connected with the English crown. The Exchequer may be plausibly held to have been derived from Normandy, and wherever territory came under English rule the methods familiar at home seem to have been adopted. With the loss of the French possessions the older cases of the kind disappeared. Ireland, however, had its own exchequer, and Scotland remained a distinct kingdom. The 18th century introduced a remarkable change. One of the aims of the union with Scotland was to secure freedom of commerce throughout Great Britain, and the two revenue systems were amalgamated. Scotland was assigned a very moderate share of the land tax (under one-fortieth), and was exempted from certain stamp duties. The attempt to apply selected forms of taxation custom duties (1764), stamp duties (1765), and finally the effort to collect the tea duty (1773) to the American colonies are indications of a movement towards what would now be called imperialist finance.

The complete plan of federation for the British empire, outlined by Adam Smith, is avowedly actuated by financial considerations. Notwithstanding the failure of this movement in the case of the colonies, the close of the century saw it successful in respect to Ireland, though separate financial departments were retained until after the close of the Napoleonic War and some fiscal differences still remain. By the consolidation of the English and Irish exchequers and the passage from war to peace, the years between 1815 and 1820 may be said to mark a distinct step in the financial development of the country. The connected change in the Bank of England by the resumption of special payments supports this view. Moreover, the political conditions in their influence on finance were undergoing a revolution. The landed interest, though powerful at the moment, had henceforth to face the rivalry of the wealthy manufacturing communities of the north of England, and it may be added that the influence of theoretic discussion was likely to be felt in the treatment of the financial policy of the nation. Canons as to the proper system of administration, taxation and borrowing come to be noticed by statesmen and officials.

These influences may be followed out in their working by observing the chief lines of adjustment and modification that followed the conclusion of peace. Relieved from the extraordinary outlay of the preceding years, the government felt bound to propose reductions. With commendable prudence it was resolved to retain the income-tax at 5% (one-half of the former rate), and to join with this reduction the removal of some war duties on malt and spirits. Popular feeling against direct taxation was so strong that the income-tax had to be surrendered in toto, a course which seriously embarrassed the finances of the following years. For over twenty five years the income-tax remained in abeyance, to the great detriment of the revenue system. Its revival by Peel (1842), intended as a temporary expedient, proved its services as a permanent tax; it has continued and expanded considerably since. Both the excise and customs at the close of the war were marked by some of the worst defects of a vicious kind of taxation. The former had the evil effect of restricting the progress of industry and hampering invention.

The raw materials and the auxiliary substances of industry were in many cases raised in price. The duties on salt and glass specially illustrated the bad results of the excise. New processes were hindered and routine made compulsory. The customs duties were still more restrictive of trade; as they practically excluded foreign manufactures, and were both costly and in many instances unproductive of revenue. As George Richardson Porter showed in Progress of the Nation (1851), the really profitable customs taxes were few in number. Less than a score of articles contributed more than 95% the revenue from import duties. The duties on transactions, levied chiefly by stamps, were ill-graded and lacking in comprehensiveness.

From the standpoint of equity the ground for criticism was equally plain. The great weight of taxation fell on the poorer classes. The owners of land escaped giving any return for the property that they held under the state, and other persons were not taxed in proportion to their abilities, which had been long recognised as the proper criterion.

The grievance as to distribution has been modified, if not removed, by the great development of:

1. The income-tax
2. The death or inheritance duties.

Beginning at the rate of 7d. per pound (1842–1854), the income-tax was raised to 1s. 4d. for the Crimean War, and then continued at varying rates reduced to 2d. in 1874, it rose to 5d., then in 1894 to 8d., and by 1909 appeared to be fixed as a minimum at 1s., or 5% on income from property. The yield per penny on has risen almost uninterruptedly. From £710,000 in 1842, it now exceeds £2,800,000, though the exemptions and abatements are much more extensive. In fact, all incomes of £3 per week are absolutely free (£160 per annum is the precise exemption limit), and an income of £400 derived from personal exertion pays less than 5 1/2d. per pound, or 2 1/4%. The great productiveness of the tax is equally remarkable. From £5,600,000 in 1843 (with a rate of 7d.) the return rose to £32,380,000 in 1907–1908, having been at the maximum of £38,800,000 in 1902–1903, with a tax rate of 6 1/4%. The income-tax thus supplies about one-fifth of the total revenue, or one-fourth of that obtained by taxation.

Several fundamental questions of finance are connected with the taxation of income and have been dealt with by English practice. Small incomes claim lenient treatment; and, as mentioned above, this leniency means in England complete freedom. Again, earned incomes appear to represent lower ability to pay than unearned ones. Long refused on practical grounds (as by Gladstone and Lowe), the concession of an abatement of 25% on earned incomes of £2,000 and under was granted in 1907. The question whether savings should be exempt from taxation as income has (with the exception of life insurance premiums) been decided in the negative. Allowances for depreciation and cost of repairs are partially recognised.

Far more important than these special problems is the general one of increased tax rates on large incomes. Up to 1908-1909 the tax above the abatement limit of £700 remained strictly proportional but opinion showed a decided tendency in favour of extra rates or a supertax on incomes above an assigned amount (e.g. £5,000), and this was included in the budget of 1909–1910.

== Estate duty ==
In close relation with the income-tax is the estate duty, with its adjuncts of legacy and succession duties. After Pitt's failure to carry the succession duty in 1796, no change was made until Gladstone's introduction in 1853 of a duty on land and settled property parallel to the legacy duty on free personality. Apart from certain minor alterations, the really vital change was the extension in 1894 of the old probate duty into a comprehensive impost applicable to all the possessions of a deceased person. This Inheritance Tax (to give it its scientific title) operates as a complementary property tax, and is thus an addition to the contribution from incomes derived from large properties.

By graduation the charges on large estates in 1908-1909 (before the proposal for further increase in 1909–1910) came to 10% on £1,000,000, and reached the maximum of 15% at £3,500,000. From the several forms of the inheritance taxes the national revenue gained £14,500,000, with £4 1/2 million as a supplementary yield for local finance.

The expansion of direct taxation is evident on comparing 1840 with 1908. In the former year the probate and legacy duties brought in about one million pounds; the other direct taxes; even including the house duty, did not raise the total to £3,000,000. In 1908 the direct taxation of property and income supplied £51,500,000, or one-third of the total receipts as against less than one-twentieth in 1840.

But though this wider employment of direct taxation a characteristic of European finance generally reduced the relative position of the taxation of commodities, there was a growth in the absolute amount obtained from this category of duties. There were also considerable alterations, the result of changes in the views respecting fiscal policy. At the close of World War I the excise duties were at first retained, and even in some cases increased. After some years, reforms began. The following articles amongst others were freed from charge: salt (1825); leather and candles (1830); glass (1845); soap (1853); and paper (1860). The guiding principles were:

1. The removal of raw materials from the list of goods liable to excise
2. The limitation of the excise to a small number of productive articles
3. The placing of the greater part (practically nearly the whole) of this form of taxation on alcoholic drinks

Apart from breweries and distilleries, the excise had little field for its work. The large revenue of £35,700,000 in 1907-1908 was derived one-half from spirits (£17,700,000), over one-third from beer, while most of the remainder was obtained from business taxation in the form of licences, the raising of which was one of the features of the budget in 1909. As a feeder of the revenue the excise might be regarded as, equal to the income-tax, but less to be relied on in times of depression.

Valuable as were the reforms of the excise after 1820, they were insignificant as compared with the changes in the customs. The particular circumstances of English political life have led to perhaps undue emphasis being placed on this particular branch of financial development. Between 1820 and 1860 the customs system was transformed from a highly complicated arrangement of duties, pressing with severity on nearly all foreign imports, into a simple and easily understood set of charges on certain specially selected commodities. All favours or preferences to home or colonial producers disappeared.

Expressed in financial terms, all duties were imposed for revenue only, and estimated in reference to their productiveness. An assimilation between the excise and customs rates necessarily followed. The stages of the development under the guidance of Huskisson, Peel, and Gladstone are commonly regarded as part of the movement for Free Trade but the financial working of the alteration is understood only by remembering that the duties removed by tens or by hundreds were quite trivial in yield, and did not involve any serious loss to the revenue.

Perhaps the most remarkable feature of the English customs of the 19th century was the steadiness of the receipts. In spite of trade depressions, discussion was likely to be felt in the treatment of the financial policy of the nation. Canons as to the proper system of administration, taxation and borrowing come to be noticed by statesmen and officials.

The exemption of raw materials and food; the absence of duties on imported, as on home manufactures; the selection of a small number of articles for duty; the rather rigorous treatment of spirits and tobacco, were the salient marks of the English fiscal system which grew up in the 19th century. The part of the system most criticised was the very narrow list of dutiable articles. Why, it was asked, should a choice be made of certain objects for the purpose of imposing heavy taxation on them?

The answer has been that they were taken as typical of consumption in general and were easily supervised for taxation. Moreover, the sumptuary element is introduced by the policy of putting exceptionally heavy duties on spirits and tobacco, with lighter charges on the less expensive wines and beers.

Facility of collection and distribution of taxation over a larger class appear to be the grounds for the inclusion of the tea and coffee duties, which are further supported by the need for obtaining a contribution of, roughly speaking, over half the tax revenue by duties on commodities. The last consideration led, at the beginning of the 20th century, to the sugar tax and the temporary duties on imported corn and exported coal.

As a support to the great divisions of income-tax, death duties, excise and customs, the stamps, fees and miscellaneous taxes are of decided service. A return of £9,000,000 was secured by stamp duties. So-called non-tax revenue largely increased, owing to the extension of the postal and telegraphic services. The real gain was not so great, as out of gross receipts of £22,000,000 over £17,500,000 is absorbed in expenses, while the carriage of ordinary letters seems to be the only profitable part of these services. Crown lands and rights (such as vintage charges) were of even less financial value.

== See also ==
- Economic history of Britain
- Finance

== Sources ==
- As of October 2019, the text here is substantially a copy of the 1911 article. The few sections of additional material are noted appropriately.
