= Book of Fees =

English medieval manuscript listing feudal landholdings

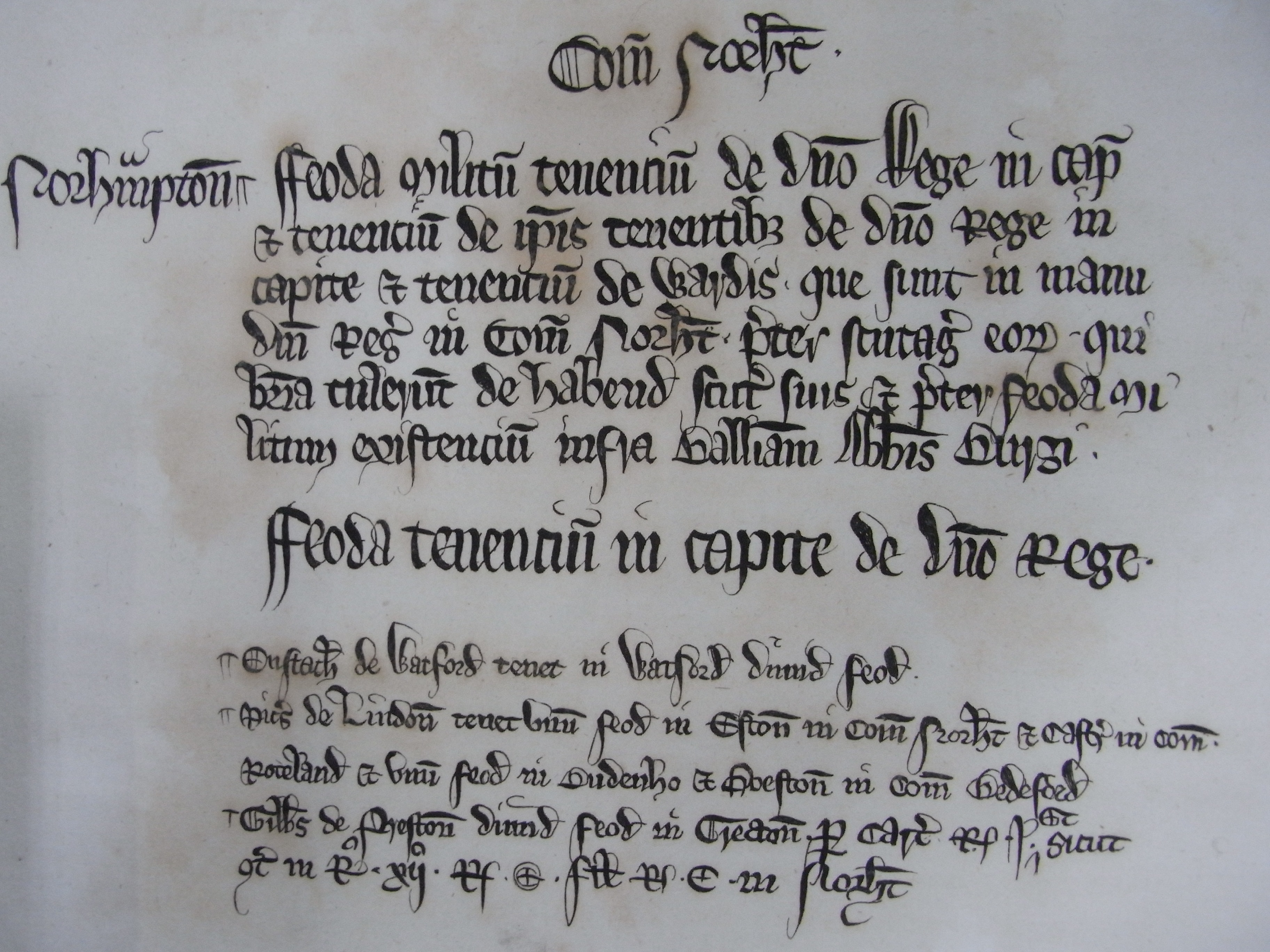
Facsimile of an entry in the Testa de Nevill, c. 1302. The entry is for fees in Northamptonshire.

The Book of Fees is the colloquial title of a modern edition, transcript, rearrangement and enhancement of the medieval Liber Feodorum (Latin: 'Book of Fiefs') which is a listing of feudal landholdings or fief (Middle English fees), compiled in about 1302, but from earlier records, for the use of the English Exchequer. Originally in two volumes of parchment, the Liber Feodorum is a collection of about 500 written brief notes made between 1198 and 1292 concerning fiefs held in capite or in-chief, that is to say directly from the Crown.

From an early date, the book comprising these volumes has been known informally as the Testa de Nevill (meaning 'Head of Nevill'), supposedly after an image on the cover of the volume of one of its two major source collections. The modern standard edition, known colloquially as "The Book of Fees" whose three volumes were published between 1920 and 1931, improves on two earlier 19th-century efforts at publishing a comprehensive and reliable modern edition of all these mediaeval records of fees. The nomenclature Book of Fees is that generally used in academic citations by modern scholars to refer to this 20th-century modern published edition of the ancient collected documents.

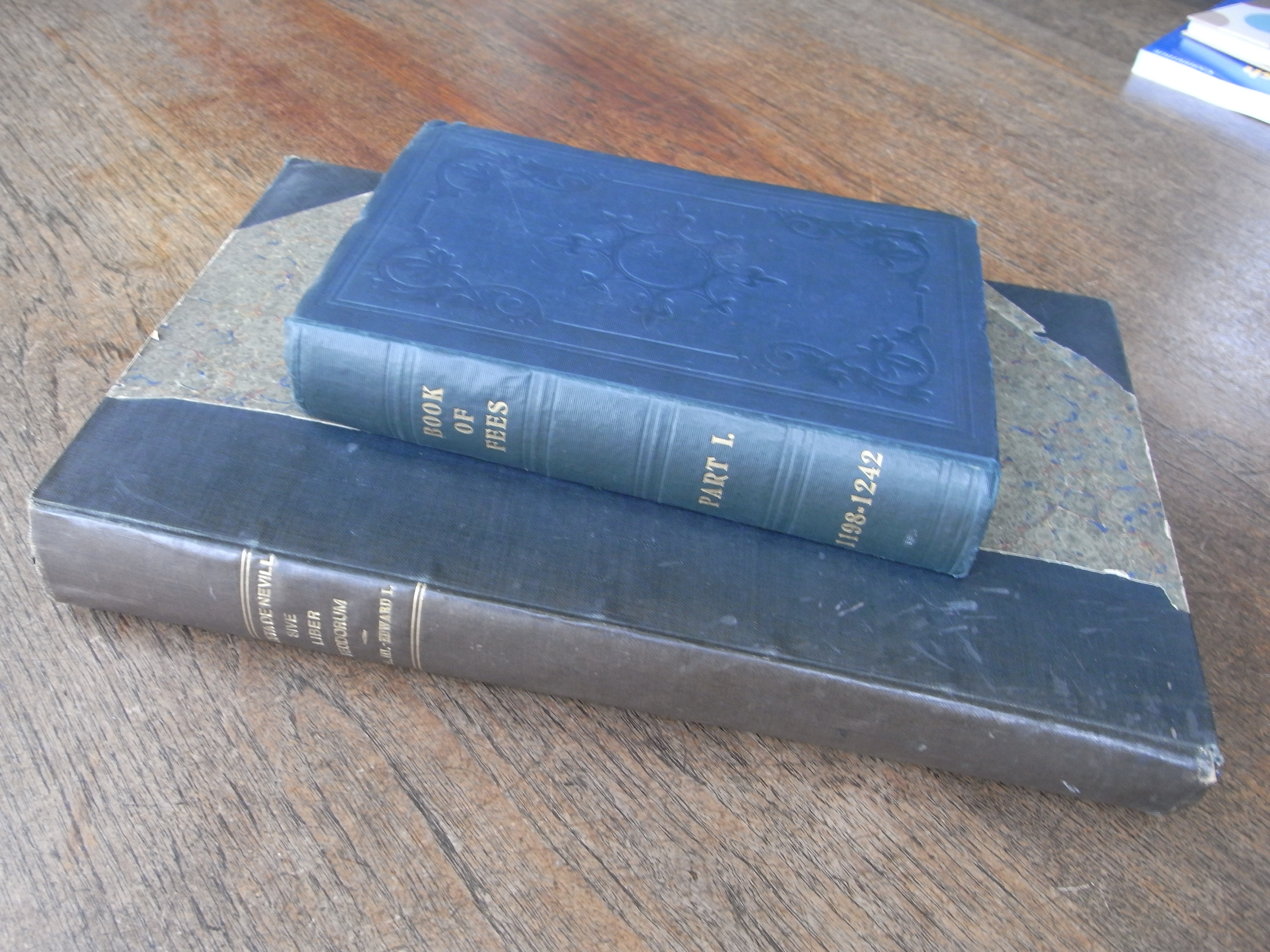
Two modern transcript editions of the Testa de Nevill/Liber Feodorum/Book of Fees, the 1920 edition (vol 1 of 3) atop the 1807 folio edition

== Origins ==
Sir Henry Maxwell-Lyte in his preface to the latest edition, suggests that the documents transcribed into the "Book of Fees" stem from two major collections of records:

- The first dates from the reign of King John (1199–1216) and was long known as the Testa de Nevill or Neville, 'Head of Nevill'. The Classical Latin word testa literally means 'burnt clay; earthen container, pot, urn', but was also used in a transferred sense to mean 'shell, covering'. In the Low Latin of the Middle Ages, the word had acquired the meaning 'skull' or 'head' (whence the French word for 'head', tête), for which the Classical Latin word is caput. Maxwell-Lyte suggested that Testa de Nevill originally referred to some receptacle for keeping a particular group of administrative documents, marked as it may have been by the head of a man named Nevill, as it had been the custom for officers of the Exchequer to mark certain documentary collections with drawn symbols, such as the heads of important departmental officials. There are too many namesakes from the period to permit his identification, but it is known that several officials surnamed Nevill[e] were associated with the Exchequer during the 13th century, most notably Ralph Neville, the chancellor himself. An Exchequer Roll of 1298 seems to bear witness to this collection of documents as it mentions a rotulus Teste de Nevill ('roll from (the) Testa de Nevill').
- The second collection consisted of two or more rolls of parchment, one of which is still extant, headed by the title Serjantie arentate per Robertum Passelewe tempore Regis H. filii Regis Johannis, meaning "Concerning the serjeanties let by Robert Passelewe in the time of King Henry III, son of King John". It reports on the inquiries and their subsequent proceedings when Passelewe, a royal clerk and Bishop of Chichester, let (i.e. rented out, the technical term is "arrented") a number of lands held by the feudal land tenure of serjeanty. The text is accompanied by passages quoted from several documents which are also contained within the Testa de Nevill. Added to this are the returns for several counties in answer to an inquiry made in 1255.

== The making of the Liber Feodorum ==
Towards the end of the reign of King Edward I (1272–1307), documents from these various collections were brought together into a massive book compiled for the use of the Exchequer. The Liber Feodorum, as it was officially entitled, is first referred to in the Issue Roll for 1302 which reports that John of Drokensford (Droxford), keeper of the royal wardrobe, paid the sum of £4 13s to William of Coshall for the service of transcribing the liber de feodis ("book concerning fees") into two volumes. The book was bound the same year and book measures 12 1/2 by 9 inches and would have been larger had not the binder cut down the margins, removing some textual notes in the process. It is held in the National Archives under catalogue number E164/5-6. The surviving documents from which it was compiled are also held by the National Archives, catalogued under E198 as follows, in date order:

- 1198, Inquiry into serjeanties recorded during the assessment of a carucage (E198/2/1)
- 1212 Inquiry into tenures and alienations (E198/2/4-8)
- 1219, Eyres (E198/2/9)
- 1220, Carucage (E198/2/10)
- 1227, Eyre (E198/2/11)
- 1235, Feudal aid for marrying the king's sister (E198/2/13-18)
- 1236, Inquiry into aliens
- 1242, Scutage of Gascony (E198/2/21-27)
- 1244, Inquiry into serjeanties and aliens
- 1250, Inquiry into serjeanties (E198/2/31)

=== Reason for production ===
Maxwell-Lyte suggests that the production of the book was prompted by the Aid which was to be collected from King Edward I's tenants-in-chief for the marriage of his eldest daughter. The Aid was assessed on fees held by feudal tenures of either knight service or serjeanty. As the Exchequer needed to initiate inquiries for the purpose of assessing and collecting the aid, it was desired that the various documents should be capable of consultation in a format facilitating quick reference. In 1303 many of the original rolls were lent to the officers in charge of making the assessment and collecting of the aid.

Opposing Maxwell-Lyte's suggested purpose, the historian F. M. Powicke objected that the evidence for such a historically concrete motive is weak and asserted that the expertise alone of the officers would have been sufficient for the job. He proposed instead that a rationale for its production may be found in the political attitudes of King Edward I, whose "insistence upon feudal rights and duties kept the officials of the exchequer very busy". It was therefore naturally to be expected that during the rule of such a king unique and often fragile records to which the Exchequer had to make frequent recourse should be produced in a new edition which assisted the clerks in making their work efficient.

=== A Register only ===
For whatever purpose, the new compilation was not intended to replace or supersede the original documents in the sense of definitive and authoritative records. This is made clear in a memorandum written on the flyleaf, which appears to be contemporary with the manuscript itself:

Memorandum quod iste liber compositus fuit et compilatus de diversis inquisitionibus ex officio captis...et sic contenta in eodem libro pro evidenciis habentur hic in Scaccario et non pro recordo. ("It must be remembered that this book was composed and compiled from several official inquests...and therefore the contents in this book are held for evidence here in the Exchequer and not for the record").

Michael Clanchy describes it as a "register" (after the medieval Latin term registrum), which he defines primarily as an administrative reference book which did not enjoy the authority of the originals as a record in legal proceedings. Earlier examples of such registers or "remembrance books" include the Red Book of the Exchequer and the Black Book of the Admiralty, an Old French compilation of maritime law.

=== Legal authority ===
The written cautionary instruction that the compilation could not replace the originals in the sense of a legal record which could be used as evidence is repeated in later times. For example, the statement on the flyleaf is cited in the vernacular by an Old French document recording a petition of monks from Croyland Abbey in 1383. Officers of the Exchequer repeated the memorandum themselves on several occasions.

The position changed however over time. Many of the original documents were already in poor condition at the time of their transcription and of those that were lent out to itinerant officers for the collection of the aid in 1303, many were never returned. Thus the book rather than originals eventually became of necessity a first reference for the Exchequer, a development which itself contributed to the neglect of the originals. Indeed, by 1383 the name Testa de Nevill had come to be used colloquially for the two volumes, while the archive formerly known by that name is no longer mentioned in the sources.

== Transcribed example ==
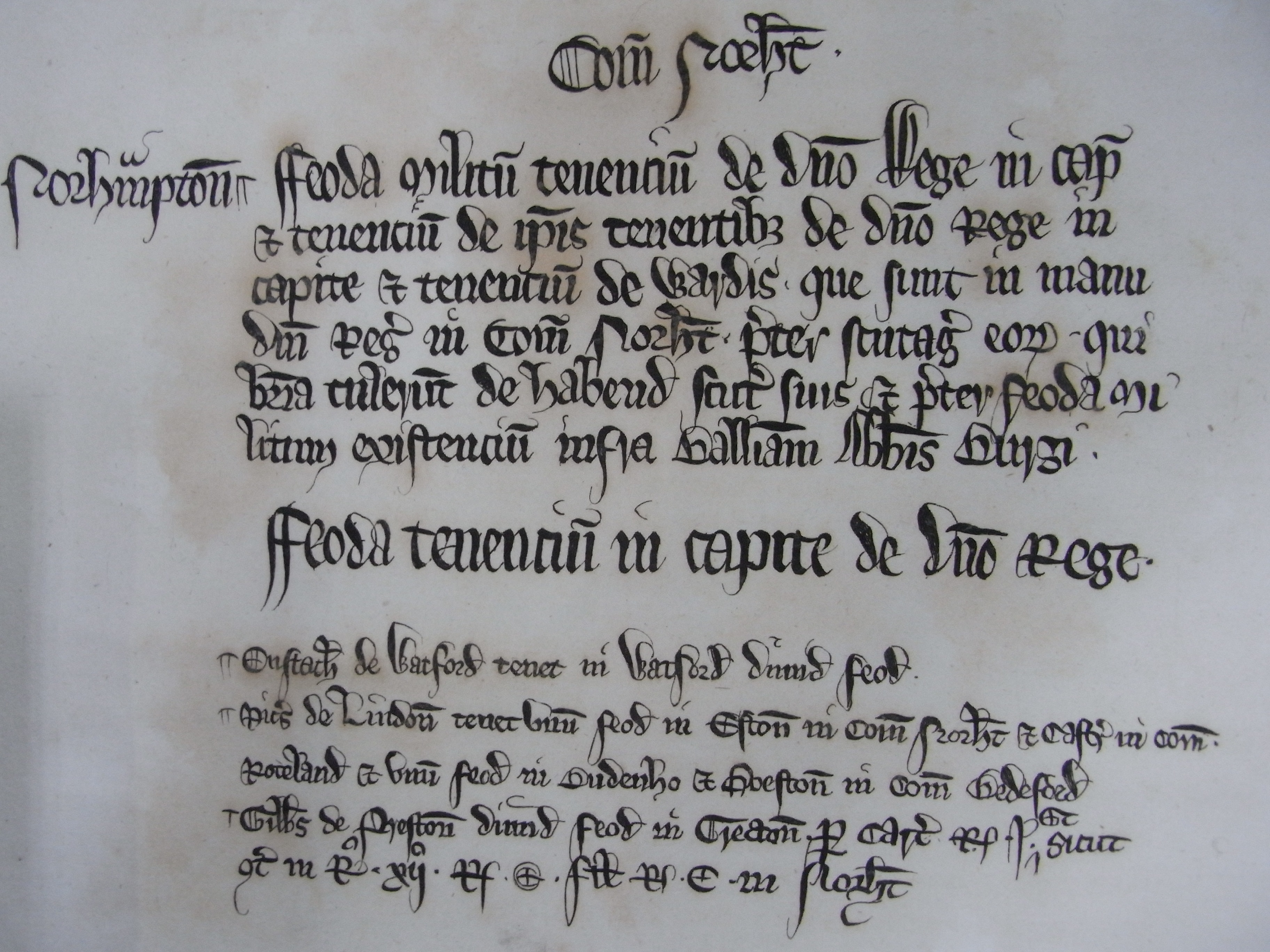
Facsimile of an entry in the Testa de Nevill, c.1302. The entry is for fees in Northamptonshire

Norh'mpton: Feoda militum tenencium de domino rege in capite et tenencium de ipsis tenentibus de domino rege in capite et tenencium de wardis quae sunt in manu domini regis in comitatu Norht' propter scutagium eos quorum vera(?) tulerunt de habendum scutagium suis et propter feoda militum existencium infra balliam abbis burgi.

Feoda tenencium in capite de domino rege:

- Eustach de Watford tenet in WATFORD dimidium feodum
- Ricardus de Lindon tenet unum feodum in ESTON in comitatu NOR'HT et CASTR in comitatu ROTELAND et unum feodum in BUDENHO et BOESTON in comitatu BEDEFORD
- Gilbertus de Preston dimidium feodum in GRETTON per cartam regis Johannis et sicut in regno XII regis Edwardii filii rex Edwardii in Nor'ht

Translation:

"Northampton: Fees of military tenants held in chief from the Lord King and holdings in chief by the same tenants from the Lord King and holdings of wardships which are in the hands of the Lord King in the county of Northampton on account of scutage those of whom in truth who bear... from having their scutage and on account of knight's fees in existence within the bailiwick of the Abbey of Northampton.

Knight's fees held in chief from the Lord King:

- Eustace de Watford holds half a fee in Watford
- Richard de Lindon holds one fee in Eston in the county of Northampton and Castr in the county of Rutland and one fee in Budenho and Boston in the county of Bedford
- Gilbert de Preston half a fee in Gretton as by the charter of King John just as in the 12th year of the reign of King Edward the son of King Edward in Northamptonshire".

== Modern editions ==
=== 1804 edition ===
A printed edition of the book was first produced by staff of the Exchequer in December 1804, at the special request of Royal Commissioners. The text was taken from a transcript made by an Exchequer clerk named Simpson, and was edited by John Caley and William Illingworth with a preface added by Illingworth.

- Caley, John and William Illingworth (ed. and pref.). Testa de Nevill sive Liber feodorum in Curia Scaccarii. Temp. Hen. III & Edw. I. London, Exchequer / Record Commission, 1804.

=== 1807 edition ===
Title page of 1807 edition

In 1807 a diplomatic edition was published in the format of one thick volume, in which a non-chronological arrangement of the contents was retained, and blank spaces between various entries sometimes omitted. It is said to "bristle with error and confusion throughout". Maxwell-Lyte complained that the resulting structure was potentially misleading and highly inconvenient to students and scholars seeking to establish dates for particular entries. In the opinion of the historian and genealogist J. Horace Round the edition was “at once the hunting-ground and the despair of the topographer and the student of genealogy".

- Diplomatic edition, with an index of places and persons prepared by Sir Henry Ellis and Thomas Hartwell Horne. OCLC: 1407059.

=== 1920–31: 3 volume edition ===
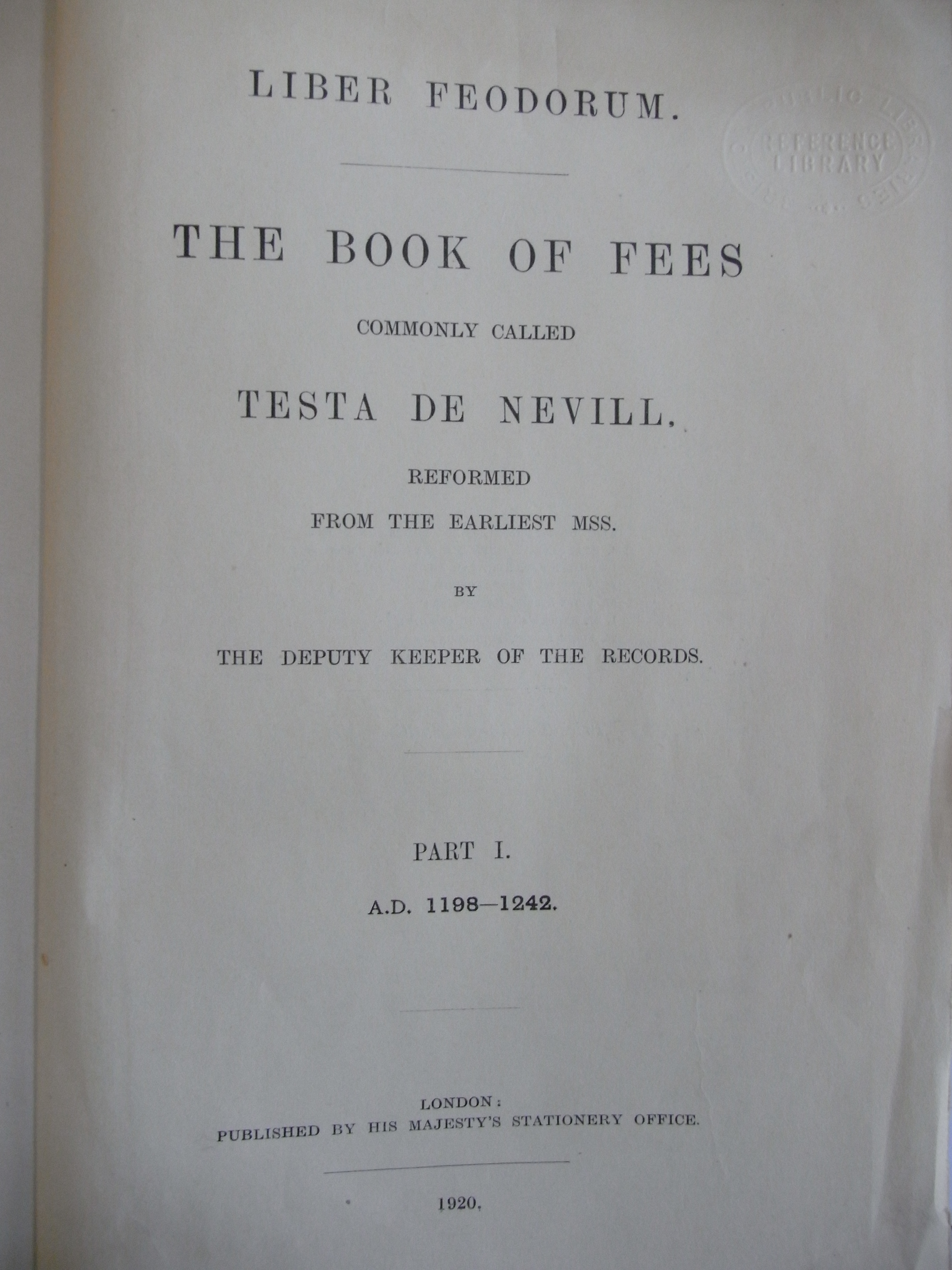
Title page of 1920 edition, vol. 1 ("part 1") (of 3) 1920-1931

Between 1920 and 1931 a new edition in three volumes was published by the Public Record Office, presenting a new and revised, critical edition of the Book of Fees. C. G. Crump was responsible for editing the Latin text and significant contributions were also made by other officers of the P.R.O., including A. S. Maskelyne, who prepared the 700-page index. The preface was written by the Deputy Keeper of the Public Record Office, Sir Henry Maxwell-Lyte, who explained that the new edition represented a radical departure from its precursor. Firstly, the clumsy semi-geographical order adopted by the mediaeval transcriber was abandoned and instead the material was for the most part arranged chronologically. Secondly, whenever possible it was based directly on the original materials used by William of Coshal. Moreover, certain omissions by the transcriber were supplied. In 1932 historian F.M. Powicke hailed the edition as an “indispensable guide...one of which the Public Record Office may well be proud”.

- "Liber Feodorum: The Book of Fees commonly known called Testa de Nevill, reformed from the earliest MS, by the Deputy Keeper of the Records", Preface by Sir Henry Maxwell-Lyte, 3 volumes, published by His Majesty's Stationery Office, 1920–31. (Available from Family History Archives in the digital collections of the Harold B. Lee Library.)
  - Vol. 1 (AD. 1198-1242), London, 1920
  - Vol. 2 (AD 1242-1293 and appendix), London, 1923
  - Vol.3 (Index). London, 1931

== Sources ==
- Clanchy, M.T. (1993). From memory to written record: England 1066-1307 (2nd ed.). Oxford: Blackwell.
- Powicke, F. M. (1922). "[Review of] The Book of Fees, commonly called Testa de Nevill […] Part I". English Historical Review. 37: 570–3. doi:10.1093/ehr/xxxvii.cxlviii.570.
- Powicke, F. M. (1932). "[Review of] The Book of Fees, commonly called Testa de Nevill […] Part II". English Historical Review. 47: 494–8. doi:10.1093/ehr/xlvii.clxxxvii.494.
