= Tonnage and poundage =

English import and export duties

Tonnage and poundage were English duties and taxes first levied in Edward II's reign on every tun (cask) of imported wine, which came mostly from Spain and Portugal, and on every pound weight of merchandise exported or imported. Traditionally tonnage and poundage was granted by Parliament to the king for life, but this practice did not continue into the reign of Charles I. Tonnage and poundage were swept away by the Customs and Excise Act 1787.

== History ==
Introduced in the 14th century, tonnage was a duty upon all wines imported in addition to prisage and butlerage, while poundage was a duty imposed ad valorem at the rate of twelve pence in the pound on all merchandise imported or exported. The duties were levied at first by agreement with merchants (poundage in 1302, tonnage in 1347), then granted by Parliament in 1373, at first for a limited period only. They were considered to be imposed for the defence of the realm. From the reign of Henry VI they were usually granted for life.

Charles I's first parliament, known as the Useless Parliament, broke with tradition and granted the king tonnage and poundage for a year rather than life out of concern over the manner in which the tonnage and poundage's life grant of 1604 had been used by James I to justify impositions, which were additional duties imposed on certain items. This restriction was seen as a provocative step by Parliament as it was one of the King's main sources of revenue, and Parliament intended the one-year limit to curb Charles' autonomy by forcing him to request money from Parliament every year thereafter. Although the House of Commons passed this bill, George Villiers, 1st Duke of Buckingham led a successful effort in the House of Lords to block it. As a result, Parliament granted Charles no tonnage and poundage rights at all, which, combined with Parliament's efforts to impeach the Duke of Buckingham, led to Charles' first parliament being dissolved.

Charles, however, continued to collect unauthorised tonnage and poundage duties, and this action became a chief complaint of Charles' failed parliament of 1629. When Charles moved to adjourn the parliament, members held the speaker, John Finch, in his seat until three resolutions could be read, one of which declared anyone who paid unauthorised tonnage and poundage to be a betrayer and enemy of England.

== Impact ==
Charles I's levying of tonnage and poundage without parliamentary sanction continued to be one of the complaints of his Long Parliament. The refusal of and subsequent disputes about tonnage and poundage rights is seen as one of the many events bearing responsibility for the English Civil War.

After the Restoration they were granted to Charles II and his two successors for life. By acts of Queen Anne and George I the duties were made perpetual, and mortgaged for the public debt. In 1787 they were finally abolished by the Customs Consolidation Act, and other modes of obtaining revenue substituted.

== See also ==
- Tonnage
- Ton
- Poundage
- Ship money
