= Taxation in medieval England =

Taxes and tax policy in medieval England

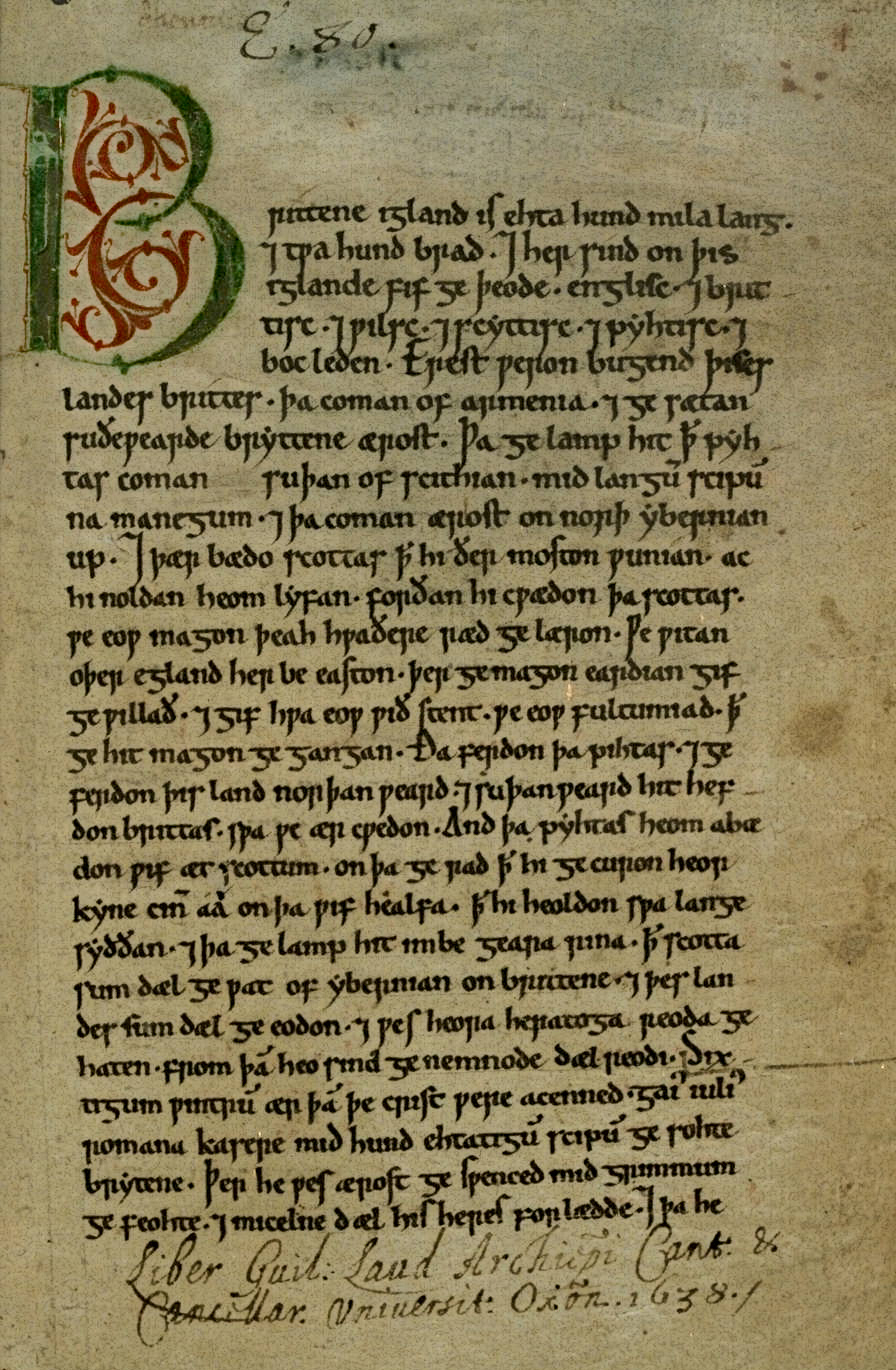
The initial page of Corpus Christi College Cambridge MS 173, the Peterborough Chronicle, which contains the oldest surviving copy of Ine's laws.

Taxation in medieval England was the system of raising money for royal and governmental expenses. During the Anglo-Saxon period, the main forms of taxation were land taxes, although custom duties and fees to mint coins were also imposed. The most important tax of the late Anglo-Saxon period was the geld, a land tax first regularly collected in 1012 to pay for mercenaries. After the Norman Conquest in 1066, the geld continued to be collected until 1162, but it was eventually replaced with taxes on personal property and income.

== Background ==
Britannia, the southern and central part of the island of Great Britain, was a province of the Roman Empire until the Roman departure from Britain in around 400 AD. The Emperor Honorius told the Britons in 410 that they were responsible for their own defence, and from then until the landing of Augustine of Canterbury in the Kingdom of Kent in 597 as part of the Gregorian mission, little is known about Britain's governmental structures or financial systems.

== Anglo-Saxon England (597–1066) ==
The first unequivocal mention of taxation in Anglo-Saxon England comes from the Law of Æthelberht, the law code of King Æthelberht of Kent, which specifies that fines from judicial cases were to be paid to the king. No other forms of taxes are mentioned in Æthelberht's law code, but other forms of taxation are implied by the grant of an exemption from taxation given by another king, Wihtred of Kent, to a church. Other mentions of taxes are contained in the law code of King Ine of Wessex. Although other early Anglo-Saxon kings are not mentioned as collecting taxes, the medieval writer Bede does mention that land in Anglesey and the Isle of Man were divided up in hides, defined in Ine's law as a unit of land that could be used for collecting food and other goods from the king's subjects. A document from the 7th or 8th century, the Tribal Hidage, shows that much of the Anglo-Saxon lands had been divided into hides by that time. Charters from the time of King Offa of Mercia show that tolls were collected on trade, and it was during Offa's reign that coinage in silver pennies was first introduced into Anglo-Saxon England. Coinage became a royal right and was probably introduced to make payment of taxes easier.

In early Anglo-Saxon England, the hide was used as the basis for assessing the amount of food rent (known as feorm) due from an area. Initially, the size of the hide varied according to the value and resources of the land itself. Over time the hide became the unit on what all public obligation was assessed. Tenants had a threefold obligation, based on their landholding, they had to provide manpower for the so-called "common burdens" of military service, fortress work, and bridge repair. With increasing problems from raiding Vikings, the Anglo-Saxon leaders raised taxes, also based on the landholding (or hidage) of their tenants. The tax was known as geld or gafol and was used to pay the raiders off rather than fight. After the Norman Conquest, it became known more commonly as Danegeld. In the 9th century Alfred the Great confronted the Viking problem. After his victory over them at the Battle of Edington (878), he set about building a system of fortified towns or forts, known as burhs. He also updated the traditional fyrd to provide a standing army and navy. To fund all of these changes Alfred required a new system of tax and conscription that is contained in a document, now known as the Burghal Hidage. The Burghal Hidage contains a list of over thirty fortified places and the taxes, recorded as numbers of hides, assigned for their maintenance. Long after Alfred's death, his great-grandson Edgar developed the tax system further by periodically recalling and reminting all the coinage, with the moneyers being forced to pay for new dies. All profits from these actions went to the king and were a royal right. Despite all these changes, the Anglo-Saxon Chronicle records payment of £132,000 in tribute to the Scandinavian attackers from 991 to 1012.

The year 1012 saw the introduction of the geld or heregeld (literally "army tax"), an annual tax first assessed by King Æthelred the Unready to pay for mercenaries in the army and navy. The reinforced military was needed, in the face of an invasion of England, by King Sweyn Forkbeard of Denmark. Later, after the conquest of England by Sweyn's son Cnut the Great, the geld was continued. This tax used similar machinery for collection as Danegeld and was again based on the number of hides a tenant had. The amount due from each hide was variable. In 1051 Edward the Confessor abolished heregeld and saved money by selling off his navy, giving the responsibility of naval defense to the Cinque ports in return for various privileges. However, heregeld was possibly reinstated in 1052.

== Norman and Angevin England (1066–1216) ==
There was no formal division between the household of the king and the government in the Norman period, although gradually the household itself began to separate from the government. Thus, income from taxation merged with other income to fund the king and the government without any distinctions such as in the modern world. Under the Norman and Angevin kings, the government had four main sources of income: (1) income from lands owned directly by the king, or his demesne lands, (2) income that derived from his rights as a feudal overlord, the feudal rights such as feudal aid or scutage (3) taxation, and (4) income from the fines and other profits of justice. By the time of King Henry I, most revenues were paid into the Exchequer, the English Treasury, and the first records of the Exchequer date from 1130, in the form of the first surviving Pipe Roll for that year. From the reign of King Henry II, Pipe Rolls form a mostly continuous record of royal revenues and taxation. However, not all revenue went into the Exchequer, and some occasional taxes and levies were never recorded in the Pipe Rolls.

Taxation itself took a number of forms in this period. The main tax was the geld, still based on the land, and unique in Europe at the time as being the only land tax that was universal on all the king's subjects, not just his immediate feudal tenants and peasants. It was still assessed on the hide, and the usual rate was 2 shillings per hide. In certain circumstances, however, taxation was assessed in terms of services rendered to the crown, such as Avera and Inward.

Because the geld was assessed on landowners, it only applied to free men who owned land, and thus serfs and slaves were exempt. Other exemptions were granted to favored subjects or were a right that went with certain governmental offices. The geld was unpopular, and because of the increasing number of exemptions, yielded smaller amounts. During the reign of King Stephen, it is unclear if the geld was collected at all, as no financial records survive. However, when King Henry II came to the throne, the geld was collected once more. After 1162, however, the geld was no longer collected.

Instead, a new type of tax was imposed starting in 1166, although it was not an annual tax. This was the tax on moveable property and income, and it could be imposed at varying rates. Likewise, the Saladin tithe, imposed in 1188 to raise funds for a proposed crusade by King Henry II, was levied at the rate of 10% of all goods and revenues, with some exceptions for a knight's horse and armor and clerical vestments. Also excluded were those who had pledged to go on crusade with the king.

In 1194, in part from the need to raise the huge sums required for the ransom of King Richard I who was captive in Germany, a new land tax was instituted. This was the carucage, and like the geld, it was based on the land. The carucage was imposed six times in all, but it produced smaller sums than other means of raising revenue and was last collected in 1224.In 1194, as part of the attempts to raise Richard's ransom, a 25% levy on all personal property and income was imposed. In other years, other rates were set, such as the thirteenth imposed in 1207.

Besides taxes on land and taxes on personal property, this period saw the introduction of taxes on trade. In 1202, King John imposed a custom duty of a fifteenth of the value of all goods imported or exported. It appears, however, that these duties were discontinued in 1206.

== Plantagenet England (1216–1360) ==
During the reign of King Henry III, the king and government sought consent from the nobles of England for taxes the government wished to impose. This led in 1254 to the start of the Parliament of England, when the nobles advised the king to summon knights from each shire to help advise and consent to a new tax. In the 1260s, men from the towns were included with the knights, forming the beginnings of the House of Commons of England.

By the middle of the 13th century, the tax on the moveable property had become fixed by convention at a fifteenth for those in the country, and a tenth for those living in towns. An innovation in 1334 was the replacement of the individual assessments by a lump sum assessment for each community.

In 1275, King Edward I reestablished a customs duty, by setting a rate of a mark on each sack of wool (weighing 364 pounds (165 kg)) or 300 wool-fells, and a mark on a last of hides. Edward then added another tax, the maltolt, in 1294, on sacks of wool, which was in addition to the previous customs duty. These taxes were removed in 1296, but in 1303 they were reimposed but only on non-English merchants. Over the next 40 years, the maltolt was the subject of dispute between the king and Parliament, with the final result being that the tax was kept at a lower rate but that Parliament's consent was required to impose it.

== Late medieval England (1360–1485) ==
The revenues from the traditional sources of taxation declined in later medieval England, and a series of experiments in poll taxes began: in 1377 a flat-rate tax, in 1379 a graduated tax. By 1381, the unpopularity of these taxes had contributed to the Peasants' Revolt. Later experiments in income taxes during the 15th century did not manage to raise the sums needed by the government, and other taxes, such as taxes on parishes, were attempted.

== See also ==
- Economy of England in the Middle Ages
