= Avera and inward =

Feudal obligations in medieval England

In medieval England, avera and inward (or inguard) were feudal obligations assessed against a royal demesne. The terms refer to various services rendered to the crown in lieu of payment in coin. Avera is connected with carrying items by horse, or possibly ploughing or both. Inward is probably the provision of a bodyguard during a royal visit: in Anglo-Saxon England it could be claimed by a sheriff. The services could usually be commuted to a monetary payment: in Hertfordshire avera could be commuted for fourpence. The services were usually found in the eastern counties, especially Cambridgeshire and Hertfordshire, due from sokemen. In Hertfordshire, inward is found only in the manor of Hitchin.

== See also ==
- Taxation in medieval England
