= Carucage =

1194–1224 medieval English land tax

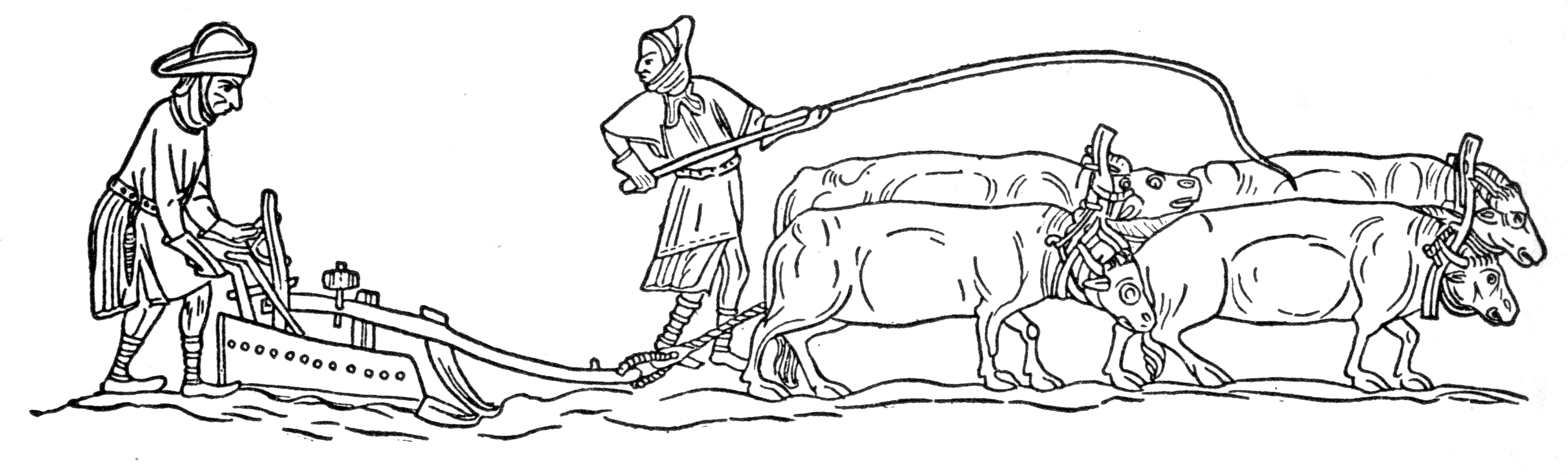
Some carucages were assessed on plough-teams, such as this four-ox-team plough, redrawn from the Luttrell Psalter, an illuminated manuscript of c. 1330.

Carucage (Note: /ˈkærəkɪdʒ/; Medieval Latin: carrūcāgium, from carrūca 'wheeled plough') was a medieval English land tax enacted by King Richard I in 1194, based on the size—variously calculated—of the taxpayer's estate. It was a replacement for the danegeld, last imposed in 1162, which had become difficult to collect because of an increasing number of exemptions. Carucage was levied just six times: by Richard in 1194 and 1198; by John, his brother and successor, in 1200; and by John's son, Henry III, in 1217, 1220, and 1224, after which it was replaced by taxes on income and personal property.

The taxable value of an estate was initially assessed from the Domesday Survey, but later methods included valuations based on the sworn testimony of neighbours or on the number of plough-teams the taxpayer used. Carucage never raised as much revenue as other taxes, but nevertheless helped to fund several projects. It paid the ransom for Richard's release in 1194 after he was taken prisoner by Leopold V, Duke of Austria; it covered the tax John had to pay King Philip II of France in 1200 on land he inherited in that country; and it helped to finance Henry III's military campaigns in England and on continental Europe.

Carucage was an attempt to secure new sources of revenue to supplement and increase royal income in a time when new demands were being made on royal finances. Although derived from the older danegeld, carucage was an experiment in revenue collection, levied only for specific purposes rather than as a regularly assessed tax. Also new was the fact that later collections were imposed with the consent of the barons. However, the main flow of royal income was from other sources, and carucage was not collected after 1224.

== Background ==
In medieval England, there was no clear separation between the king's household and the treasury. The main sources of royal income were the royal estates, feudal rights (such as feudal aids or feudal reliefs, which derived from the king's position as a feudal overlord), taxation, and fees and other profits from the judicial courts. In 1130, the records of revenues paid into the treasury show that about 40% came from royal estates, 16% from feudal rights, 14% from taxes, and 12% from the judicial courts. By 1194 revenue from the land came to about 37% of the total, (Note: This includes the revenues that the sheriffs collected from the shires, the farm of the shire, which included not only taxes but also rents and other payments from the king's lands.) about 25% came from feudal rights, taxation raised about 15%, and income from judicial sources about 11%. (Note: The numbers do not add up to 100% exactly because of rounding and because a few sources of income do not fit into the above categories. These include income from the royal forests and money gained from the Jews in England.)

English taxation after the Norman Conquest of 1066 was based on the geld or danegeld, a national tax paid by all free men, those who were not serfs or slaves. The geld was based on the number of hides of land owned by the taxpayer, (Note: A hide was a variable amount of land, often equated to the amount of land required to support a family for a year, or the amount of land an eight-ox plough-team would plough in one year. The total amount varied widely depending on the land's fertility. The size could be as small as 40 acres (16 ha) in Berkshire, up to 120 acres (49 ha) elsewhere.) and could be demanded by the king and assessed at varying levels without the need for consultation with the barons or other subjects. During King Henry I's reign, an increasing number of exemptions and the difficulties encountered in collecting the geld lowered its importance to the Exchequer—the treasury of England. It is unclear whether the geld was collected at all during the reign of Henry's successor, King Stephen. Stephen's successor, King Henry II, collected the geld only twice, once in 1155 and again in 1161–1162. The geld was unpopular, and after 1162, Henry may have felt it politically expedient to stop collecting it.

Most information about the carucage comes from the financial records associated with its collection, but there is no detailed description of the way it was collected or assessed, unlike the account of the workings of the Exchequer given in the Dialogue Concerning the Exchequer, written in about 1180. Government records such as the Pipe Rolls, the Memoranda Rolls, and other financial records, some of which are specific to the carucage, have survived, and include records of assessments and receipts for the sums collected. There are also occasional references to the tax in medieval chronicles, supplementing the information found in the financial records.

== Under Richard I ==
Under Henry's son, King Richard I, a new land tax was collected, the first since 1162. It was organised by Hubert Walter, the justiciar of England, who was in charge of governing England while the king was gone. Like the geld, the carucage was based on the amount of land owned, thus targeting free men rather than serfs, who owned no land and were therefore exempt. First collected in 1194, and the first land tax collected in England since the geld, carucage was based on the size of the estate as measured in either hides or carucates (a unit of land that could be ploughed by an eight-ox plough-team in a year, which was normally considered equivalent to a hide). (Note: Because the first collection of the carucage was levied to pay Richard's ransom when he was imprisoned during his return from the Third Crusade, this incident of the tax can also be considered a feudal aid—a payment from a feudal vassal to their overlord required when the latter had to be ransomed.) The original property assessment of the carucage was based on the Domesday Survey, a survey of land holdings in England that was completed by 1087.

Collected again in 1198, and usually called the "great carucage", it was initially assessed at a rate of 2 shillings per carucate (estimated at 100 acres (40 ha) or 120 acres (49 ha)), but later an additional 3 shillings per carucate was imposed. This 1198 collection was to provide the king with money for his military campaigns in France, and raised about £1,000. Some fines were subsequently imposed on taxpayers for evading payment, (Note: These are recorded in the 1199 Pipe Roll.) suggesting that the 1198 tax was not very successful.

According to the late 12th-century chronicler Roger of Howden, the main source for information on the 1198 carucage, assessments were carried out in the county by a commission of two royal officials working in each hundred (a subdivision of a county). Each of these commissions included two local knights who would take sworn testimonies in each village from four villagers and the bailiffs or estate officials of those barons holding land in the village. The resulting assessments were recorded, and the sheriff, or chief royal official of the county, would receive the money and forward it to the treasury. Estate holders in the area were responsible for the payments from their estates, and when they were handed to the Exchequer, a special procedure was followed to record the payments, which were then deposited into a dedicated set of accounts. These elaborate procedures were probably meant to avoid misappropriation of funds, but may not have been successful, as justices were later sent out to inquire into the commissioners' activities. As a result of their investigations, 23 counties paid fines to secure an end to royal inquiries and any arrears in payments.

The lower clergy and bishops resisted Richard's attempt to impose the 1198 carucage on their estates. In response, Richard withdrew their access to his royal courts, which forced them to repurchase access to the courts for a sum greater than the carucage would have collected. (Note: The royal courts were the best way for non-serfs to litigate when they were dispossessed of land by other freemen, as well as being the main way of obtaining justice in criminal matters.)

== Under John ==
King John, Richard's brother and successor, collected the carucage only once, in 1200. John set the amount to be collected from each carucate at three shillings. Revenues from this taxation do not appear in the 1200 Pipe Roll, although the designation in official records of William of Wrotham and his assistants as receptores carucagii—"receivers of the carucage"—suggest that the money raised was paid into a special commission in the Exchequer. Whether lands were assessed by the system used in 1198 is unknown. The contemporary chronicler Ralph of Coggeshall noted that an "order went throughout England by the justices or the king" to collect the tax, (Note: Or possibly "from the justices" in place of "by the justices".) which may imply that the King appointed justices to collect the tax instead of using the earlier system. The carucage was raised to pay John's feudal relief— the payment to an overlord on inheriting lands—for his 1199 inheritance of lands in France. The relief had been set by King Philip II of France, John's overlord, at 20,000 marks. Estimates of the amount raised by this carucage—about £3,000—are based on later revenues raised during the following reign.

The Cistercian monasteries in the north of England resisted the tax, claiming that they were immune to taxation. John put pressure on them, as he was in the north when the tax was announced, but the various abbeys appealed to Hubert Walter, by then Chancellor. Walter secured from the abbeys the promise of a group payment of £1,000, but in June 1200, the King rejected the offer. In October, the King returned from Normandy and resumed pressure on the monasteries, ordering the confiscation of all Cistercian livestock on royal lands after two weeks if a settlement was not reached. At the end of November, through Walter's intercession, the King capitulated and agreed to a Cistercian immunity from this tax.

== Under Henry III ==
John's son, King Henry III, assessed the carucage on three occasions, in 1217, 1220, and 1224. A new approach in 1217 and 1220 was to secure the consent of leading noblemen for the tax to be levied. The 1217 tax was once again assessed at 3 shillings per carucate. The assessment of the amount of lands held by each taxpayer involved having each landowner provide the information and swear an oath that it was correct. Like the 1200 tax, the 1217 tax was not recorded in that year's Pipe Roll, lending support to the possibility that the revenue from the tax was sent to a separate branch of the Exchequer. The 1217 carucage was only paid by laymen; the clergy made a donation in lieu of being taxed. The money raised was intended to defray the expense of the war being fought against Prince Louis of France, who had invaded England before the death of King John and was claiming the English throne.

The 1220 carucage, which was imposed on both laymen and clergy, was collected by a special commission and was paid not into the Exchequer, but to the Templar Order church in London, the New Temple. The Templars through their international organization functioned as bankers in and between countries. The three men appointed to the commission—William de Halliwell, a friar, William FitzBenedict, a London resident, and Alexander de Sawbridgeworth, an Exchequer clerk—were responsible for accounting for the money received, which amounted to £3,000. The time frame of the 1220 carucage collection was quite short; the orders for the assessments to be made were issued in August, but required the tax to be collected by Michaelmas in late September. The 1220 tax attempted to allow for variation in land values, exempting barren land from taxation. The system for the 1220 assessments was simpler than the 1217 levy, as plough-teams were counted to determine the land size rather than requiring oaths from taxpayers. This tax raised around £5,500. There was some difficulty in its collection, however, as some counties did not pay, and a number of barons refused to pay, at least at first. The 1220 carucage was levied to pay for the defence of Henry's lands in Poitou, southern France.

The 1224 carucage was a tax levied only on the clergy, and the revenues from it did not appear in that year's Pipe Roll. It is likely that the clergy who owed the carucage also collected the tax. Records indicate that the bulk of the money raised was paid into the Wardrobe, the king's personal treasury, rather than the Exchequer. The 1224 assessment was based on plough-teams, and was imposed to pay for the restitution of the lost lands in France.

== Legacy ==
The last carucage was imposed in 1224, after which most of the medieval government's revenue was raised by levying taxes on moveable or personal property, instead of on land; taxes on moveable property were first assessed in 1207. A probable reason for the abandonment of land taxes was the greater revenues raised by taxes on property and income.

Carucage was an attempt to secure new sources of revenue to supplement existing sources of income. It was also intended to increase royal revenues in the face of new demands placed upon them. Although derived from the older geld, carucage was an experiment in revenue collection, levied only for specific purposes rather than as a general tax regularly assessed. A novel feature was the consultation with the barons and other leading members of the ruling classes. Despite its intermittent use during the reigns of Richard I, John, and the early years of Henry III, the main source of royal income at that time remained scutage, feudal dues such as feudal reliefs or feudal aids, and royal rights such as the profits from the justice system.
