= Feudal relief =

Form of taxation under feudalism

Feudal relief was a one-off "fine" or form of taxation payable to an overlord by the heir of a feudal tenant to license him to take possession of his fief, i.e. an estate-in-land, by inheritance. It is comparable to a death duty or inheritance tax.

The equivalent duty at the lower levels of the feudal hierarchy was heriot (in England) or le droit du meilleur catel (in France).

== Etymology ==
The word relief comes from the Latin verb levo, to raise, lift up, elevate, with the addition of the Latin inseparable adverbial particle re-, which has three distinct meanings: back, against and again. The Latin composite verb relevo results. The term used in mediaeval Latin charters is Relevius. The payment thus obtains an heir's "relief" by his being "re-elevated" or "lifted-up again" into the place of honour and privilege formerly occupied by his predecessor.

== Rationale ==
Throughout the medieval Kingdom of England the monarch was the sole owner of land by allodial title. Land 'owning' subjects therefore in some way possessed land as tenant in the form of a fief rather than owned the land which belonged to the crown, with title absolute. Expansive fiefs were granted by William the Conqueror in reward for past service, but its continuance to heir(s) rested on the present monarch recognising the new person as owner's valuable past service. Fiefs therefore to religious institutions had perpetually recognised service, only subject to any rents or taxes imposed on grant, whereas all other legal persons, seeking tenants as heirs or assignees (assigns) would have to plead their cause and demonstrate loyalty. The payment of a fine for their "relief" is in the logic of feudalism payment in-lieu (instead) of giving directly past service to the kingdom. Thus the right to inherit a fief was akin to a pre-emption right: the king would re-grant the fief to the heir so long as the heir paid his fine, else would lease the land or grant it in fee simple, tail or pur vie (for life) to any third party currently in favour of the king. This was a valuable right as the heir was quite expert in the exploitation of the fief in question, for example he was aware through experience of its optimal cropping rotation based on its differing soil-types and drainage, and he had available a local work-force somewhat fearful of eviction and increases in sub-rents.

== Example from Pipe Rolls ==
The Pipe Roll was a class of parchment roll used by the Treasury to record financial receipts. The Pipe Roll of 6 Henry III (1222) contains the following entry:

Ricardus filius Willelmi de Scalariis II pro relevio suo de dimidia baronia...£... (received from Richard son of William de Scalarius II for his relief concerning half a barony.....the sum of £...prob. £50)

== Varieties of relief ==
In the case of a feudal baron, that is to say one who held per baroniam, it is termed "baronial relief", set at £100. Following Magna Carta of 1215, the standard rates became one quarter of a year's profit of the estate payable by an under-tenant, and a full year's profit payable by a non-baronial tenant-in-chief.

== Rates payable ==
It is clear from the pre-eminent positioning in Magna Carta (1215), of the clauses concerning the regulation of relief, that the question of the exaction of extortionate reliefs was one of the major complaints made by the barons to King John. These clauses, in order numbers 2 and 3 follow no other but a clause which promises the free election of bishops to the English church, an issue of paramount significance in the mediaeval world. There can be no better exposition of the charging structure than that given in the Charter itself, which is quoted as follows:

(2) "If any earl, baron or other person who holds lands directly from the Crown for military service shall die, and at his death his heir shall be of full age and owe a Relief, the heir shall have his inheritance on payment of the ancient scale of Relief. That is to say, the heir or heirs of an earl shall pay £100 for the entire earl's barony, the heir or heirs of a knight 100 shillings at most for the entire knight's fee and any man that owes less shall pay less in accordance with the ancient usage of fees".

(3) "But if the heir of such a person is under age (i.e. 21) and a ward, when he comes of age he shall have his inheritance without Relief or fine".

In summary, therefore, Magna Carta set feudal relief for earls (who all held per baroniam and were therefore themselves barons) at £100 and for knights at 100 shillings (i.e. £5) per knight's fee, in both cases restoring the rates to their traditional levels. Although no mention appears to be made of the rates payable by barons for their baronies, it is known that the level set was as for earls, £100. The relative proportion of relief for barony and knight's fee of 20:1 seems to imply that originally a barony consisted of, or was equivalent in some way, to twenty knight's fees.

== See also ==
- History of the English fiscal system, section: Sources of revenue
- Primer seisin

== Sources ==
- Sanders, I.J. English Baronies, A Study of their Origin & Descent 1086-1327, Oxford, 1960
