= Tenant-in-chief =

Person holding land directly of the king

In medieval and early modern Europe, a tenant-in-chief (or vassal-in-chief) was a person who held his lands under various forms of feudal land tenure directly from the lord paramount to whom he did homage, as opposed to holding them from another nobleman or senior member of the clergy. The tenure was one that denoted great honour, but also carried heavy responsibilities. The tenants-in-chief were originally responsible for providing knights and soldiers for the king's feudal army. (Note: Bracton, who indiscriminately called tenants-in-chief "barons" stated: "sunt et alii potentes sub rege qui barones dicuntur, hoc est robur belli" ["there are other magnates under the king, who are called barons, that is the hardwood of war"], quoted by Ivor John Sanders: "Bracton's definition of the baro" (plur barones) "proves that tenants of this class were considered to be the military backbone of the realm.")

== Terminology ==
The Latin term was tenens in capite. (Note: tenens (singular), tenentes (plural))

Other names for tenant-in-chief were "captal" or baron, although the latter term evolved in meaning. For example, the term "baron" was used in the Cartae Baronum of 1166, a return of all tenants-in-chief in England. At that time the term was understood to mean the "king's barons", or "king's men", because baron could still have a broader meaning. Originally, for example in Domesday Book (1086), there was a small number of powerful English tenants-in-chief under the Norman king who were all magnates directly associated with the king.

Later, as laid-out by I. J. Sanders, the old tenancies-in-chief of England from the time of the Norman king, King Henry I of England, came to have a legally distinct form of feudal land holding, the so-called tenure per baroniam. The term "baron" thus came to be used mainly for these "feudal barons", which comprised a group that over-lapped with the tenancies-in-chief, but was not identical.

== History ==
In most countries allodial property could be held by laypeople or the Christian Church. However, in the Kingdom of England after the Norman Conquest, the king became in law the sole lord paramount and only holder of land by allodial title. Thus all the lands in England became the property of the Crown. A tenure by frankalmoin, which in other countries was regarded as a form of privileged allodial holding, was in England regarded as a feudal tenement. Every land-holding was deemed by feudal custom to be no more than an estate in land, whether directly or indirectly held of the king. Absolute title in land could only be held by the king himself: the most anyone else could hold was a right over land, not a title in land per se. In England, a tenant-in-chief could enfeoff, or grant fiefs carved out of his own holding, to his own followers. The creation of subfiefs under a tenant-in-chief or other fief-holder was known as subinfeudation. The kings of the House of Normandy, however, eventually imposed on all free men who occupied a tenement (i.e. those whose tenures were "freehold", that is to say for life or heritable by their heirs), a duty of fealty to the crown rather than to their immediate lord who had enfeoffed them. This was to diminish the possibility of sub-vassals being employed by tenants-in-chief against the crown.

In the great feudal survey Domesday Book (1086), tenants-in-chief were listed first in each English county's entry. The lands held by a tenant-in-chief in England, if comprising a large feudal barony, were called an honour.

== Duties of tenants-in-chief ==
As feudal lord, the king had the right to collect scutage from the barons who held these honours. Scutage (literally shield money, from escutcheon) was a tax collected from vassals in lieu of military service. The payment of scutage rendered the crown more independent of the feudal levy and enabled it to pay for troops on its own. Once a tenant-in-chief received a demand for scutage, the cost was passed on to the sub-tenants and thus came to be regarded as a universal land tax. This tax was a development from the taxation system created under the Anglo-Saxon kings to raise money to pay off the invading Danes, the so-called Danegeld.

=== Heirs ===
When an English tenant-in-chief died, an inquisition post mortem was held in each county in which he held land and his or her land temporarily escheated (i.e. reverted) to the demesne of the crown until the heir paid a sum of money (a relief), and was then able to take possession (livery of seisin) of the lands. However, if the heir was underage (under 21 for a male heir, under 14 for an heiress) they would be subject to a feudal wardship where the custody of their lands and the right to arrange their marriage passed to the monarch, until they came of age. The wardship and marriage was not usually kept in Crown hands, but was sold, often simply to the highest bidder, unless outbid by the next of kin.

When an heir came of age, he or she passed out of wardship but could not enter upon their inheritance until, like all heirs of full age on inheritance, they had sued out their livery. In either case, the process was complicated. Eventually a warrant was issued for the livery to pass under the Great Seal. From its inception in 1540, The Court of Wards and Liveries administered the funds received from the wardships, marriages and the granting of livery; both courts and practice were abolished in 1646 and the whole system of feudal tenure – except for fee simple – was abolished by the Tenures Abolition Act 1660.

== See also ==
- English Feudal Baronies – Medieval English noble title and type of land tenure
- Fee simple – Form of freehold land ownership
- History of the English fiscal system
- Imperial immediacy – Constitutional status in the Holy Roman Empire
- Lord paramount – Feudal overlord: a lord with no obligations to a higher lord
- Mesne lord – Type of lord in the feudal system
- Overlord – Lord of a tenant

== Citations ==
=== Sources ===
- Bartlett, Robert (2000). England under the Norman and Angevin kings, 1075-1225. Oxford [England], New York: Clarendon Press; Oxford University Press. ISBN 978-0-19-154364-7. OCLC 607468805 – via Internet Archive.
- Bloch, Marc (1961). Feudal Society. Vol. 2: Social Classes and Political Organization. Chicago: University of Chicago Press. ISBN 978-0-226-05979-2. OCLC 1073722475 – via Internet Archive.
- Corèdon, Christopher; Williams, Ann (2007). A Dictionary of Medieval Terms & Phrases. Cambridge: D.S. Brewer. ISBN 978-1-322-43651-7. OCLC 898060247.
- Cosman, Madeleine Pelner (2007). Medieval Wordbook: More the 4,000 Terms and Expressions from Medieval Culture. New York: Barnes & Noble. ISBN 978-0-7607-8725-0. OCLC 1285660652 – via Internet Archive.
- "Court of Wards and Liveries: land inheritance 1540–1645". National Archives. Archived from the original on 9 August 2016.
- Friar, Stephen (2004). The Sutton Companion to Local History. Stroud: Sutton. ISBN 978-0-7524-8853-0. OCLC 824359922 – via Internet Archive.
- Ganshof, François Louis (1996) [1944]. Feudalism. Translated by Grierson, Philip. Toronto, Buffalo: University of Toronto Press : Medieval Academy of America. ISBN 978-0-8020-7158-3. OCLC 1285569511 – via Internet Archive.
- Sanders, Ivor John (1956). Feudal Military Service in England: A Study of the Constitutional and Military Powers of the Barones in Medieval England. London: Oxford Univ. Press. OCLC 246249824.
