= Scutage =

Medieval English feudal tax

Scutage was a medieval English tax levied on holders of a knight's fee under the feudal land tenure of knight-service. Under feudalism the king, through his vassals, provided land to knights for their support. The knights owed the king military service in return. The knights were allowed to "buy out" of the military service by paying scutage (a term derived from Latin scutum, "shield").

As time passed the kings began to impose a scutage on holders of knight's fees, whether or not the holder was actually a knight.

== General information ==
The institution existed under Henry I (reigned 1100–1135) and Stephen (reigned 1135–1154), when it occurs as scutagium, scuagium or escuagium. The creation of fractions of knights' fee probably hastened its introduction: the holders of such fractions could only discharge their obligation via scutage. The increasing use of mercenaries in the 12th century would also make a money payment of greater use to the crown.

Separate levies of scutage received the names of the campaigns for which they were raised, as "the scutage of Toulouse" (or "great scutage"), "the scutage of Ireland", and so forth. The levy demanded from each fee one mark (13s. 4d., two thirds of a pound), one pound or two marks, but anything above a pound seemed abnormal until John (reigned 1199–1216) imposed levies of two marks in most years without even the excuse of a war. The irritation caused by these exactions reached a climax in 1214, when John demanded three marks. Taxation through scutage became a prominent cause among the many that led to the rebellion of 1215, which culminated in the proclamation of Magna Carta of 1215. Its provisions prohibited the crown from levying any scutage save by "the common counsel of our realm".

The reissued Charter of 1217 provided, instead of this, that scutage levies should remain at the rate as of the reign of Henry II. In practice, however, under Henry III (reigned 1216–1272), scutage rates usually amounted to three marks, but required the assent of the barons, and levies occurred only on adequate occasions.

Meanwhile, a practice had arisen, possibly as early as Richard I's reign (1189–1199), of accepting from great barons special "fines" for permission not to serve in a campaign. This practice appears to have rested on the crown's right to decide whether to exact personal service or to accept scutage in lieu of service. A system of special composition thus arose which largely replaced the old one of scutage. As between the tenants-in-chief, however, and their under-tenants, the payment of scutage continued. The terms of charters of subinfeudation, which specified the quota of scutage due rather than the proportion of a knight's fee granted, often stereotyped scutage. For the purpose of recouping themselves by levying from their under-tenants, the tenants-in-chief received from the crown writs de scutagio habendo. Under Edward I (reigned 1272–1307) the new system developed so completely that the six levies of the reign, each as high as two pounds on the fee, applied in practice only to the under-tenants, their lords compounding with the crown by the payment of large sums, though their nominal assessment, somewhat mysteriously, became much lower (see Knight service).

Scutage rapidly became obsolescent as a source of revenue, Edward II (reigned 1307–1327) and Edward III (reigned 1327–1377) imposing only one levy each and relying on other more uniform and direct modes of taxation. The lengths to which subinfeudation had gone also hastened its rapid decay; increasing subinfeudation led to constant dispute and litigation as to which of the holders in the descending chain of tenure remained liable for the payment. Apart from its financial aspect it had possessed a legal importance as the test, according to Bracton, of tenure by knight-service, its payment, on however small a scale, proving the tenure to be "military" with all the consequences involved.

== Scholarship ==
J. F. Baldwin's The Scutage and Knight Service in England (1897), a dissertation printed at the University of Chicago Press, offers a major monograph on the subject (though not wholly free from error). Madox's History of the Exchequer formerly formed the standard authority. J. H. Round in Feudal England (1895) first set forth a more modern view. In 1896 appeared the Red Book of the Exchequer (Rolls series), which, with the Book of Fees (Public Record Office) and the Pipe Rolls (published by the Record Commission and the Pipe Roll Society), provides the chief record authority on the subject; but the editor misdated many of the scutages, and JH Round in his Studies on the Red Book of the Exchequer (privately issued) and his Commune of London and other Studies (1899) severely criticized his conclusions. See also Pollock and Maitland's History of English Law (1895) and McKechnie's Magna Carta (1905). Scargill Bird's "Scutage and Marshal’s Rolls" in Genealogist (1884), vol. i., has important coverage of later records.

== See also ==
- History of the English fiscal system
