= Prisage =

Prisage was a medieval duty on wine imported into England by English merchants. The duty was levied from 1150 and was intended to act as a form of purveyance for the King's household, whereby the Crown could take a certain quantity of wine from any ship importing wine, paying compensation to the owner.

During the second half of the 12th century, prisage, also known as the prise of wine, or recta prisa, evolved into a defined right for the Crown to take 1 ton of wine from any ship importing more than 10 tons and 2 tons from any ship carrying in more than 10 tons of wine. Compensation was initially paid at a little below market rate, but was then fixed at 20s. per ton. Following the inflation of the thirteenth century, the value of the wine taken to prise greatly exceed the compensation paid for it. In effect, this turned prisage into an accidental tax on foreign trade, which predated the creation of a national customs system on English overseas trade in 1275.

In 1303, foreign merchants secured exemption from prisage, in return for paying a flat duty of 2s. per ton on every ton of wine imported. This was called butlerage. English merchants refused the offer to do the same, since some of them had secured special exemptions from prisage.

The most detailed study of prisage is that provided by Margaret Condon. She also published a detailed annotated transcription of a 16th-century account for Butlerage and Prisage in Bristol. The introduction to the transcript explains how both duties were collected by the 'deputy butler' in the port and how the accounting process worked.

By the early 16th century, the market value of wine imported to Bristol ranged from c. £5 for Bordeaux wine to c. £6 for wine from Andalusia. Since the compensation in Bristol was set at 15s. (£0.75), the effective duty was high enough to encourage various forms of tax evasion by merchants. For instance, if a ship was carrying 10 tons of English-owned wine, the merchants might claim that 1 ton belonged to a foreign merchant, who would then pay butlerage of 2s. on that single ton. Since the amount of English-owned wine was now below the 10 ton threshold for prisage, the duty would not be levied on any of the consignment. Alternatively, since customs duties were not collected in Wales, some merchants landed their cargoes in Wales, broke the consignment up into lots of 9 tons and then sent each lot separately across the Severn Estuary to Bristol. Since each boat carried less than 10 tons, the owners could claim that none was subject to prisage. Such evasions were well recognised, leading to frequent complaints and litigation.

Apart from encouraging various forms of evasion and fraud, prisage also provided a financial incentive for English merchants to import wine in large ships, since the maximum amount of wine that could be taken to prise was limited to 2 tons per ship. The effective duty on a ship carrying 100 tons of wine was thus much less than one carrying 20 tons.

The earliest tracts on prisage, its history and collection, were written in the 17th century by the English jurist Matthew Hale. These were republished in the late 18th century when the duty was still applied. However, by 1728 an encyclopaedia noted of 'prisage' that 'The Term is now, almost grown into disuse; and in lieu of Prisage, the Custom is popularly call'd Buterage; bcause 'tis the King's chief Butler that receives it.' Prisage and butlerage were abolished in 1809.
