= Butlerage =

Wine tax

Butlerage was a duty of two shillings on every ton of wine imported into England by foreign merchants. It was so called because it was paid to the king's butler for the king. The tax was levied from 1302 to 1809, representing a commutation of the crown's right of prisage (also called the prise of wine, or recta prisa). Butlerage was initially only applied to merchants from Aquitaine, which included the key wine exporting port of Bordeaux, but was then extended to all foreign merchants in 1303. A similar commutation was offered to English merchants, but they refused, since many were exempt from prisage.

The most detailed study of prisage and butlerage is that provided by Margaret Condon. She has also published a detailed annotated transcription of a sixteenth-century account for prisage and butlerage from Bristol, which explains how both were collected.

The earliest tracts on prisage and butlerage, their history and collection, were written in the 17th century by the English jurist Matthew Hale. These were republished in the late 18th century when the duties still applied. Prisage and butlerage were both abolished in 1809.
