= Feudal aid =

Medieval right to a monetary gift from a vassal to a lord

Feudal aid is the legal term for one of the financial duties required of a feudal tenant or vassal to his lord. Variations on the feudal aid were collected in England, France, Germany and Italy during the Middle Ages, although the exact circumstances varied.

== Origin ==
The term originated in the late 11th century, and it first appears in northern France, in the County of Anjou. It was a payment made by the tenant or vassal to the lord on certain occasions, usually the knighting of the lord's eldest son and the marriage of his eldest daughter. Occasionally it was collected when the lord needed to pay a ransom after being captured. Sometimes a fourth occasion was added to the customary list: when the lord went on Crusade. Other times when aids might be demanded were when the lord himself was being taxed by his own superiors. At those times, the lord might try to pass the demand on to his own vassals.

The growth of the custom sprang from the traditional obligation of the vassal to render aid and counsel to his lord. At first, this was physical aid in the form of military service and attendance at the lord's court, but gradually it came to include financial aid to the lord as well. As it became obligatory to give monetary gifts to the lord, it also became limited by custom to set occasions.

== In France ==
The first recorded royal feudal aid levied in France was that of 1137. This was assessed by King Louis VI in order to pay for the marriage of his heir, the future Louis VII, to Eleanor of Aquitaine. Another aid was levied in 1147 by Louis VII to pay for his crusade. The kings of France continued to collect aids for crusading under Philip II and Louis IX. Under Philip IV, the payment of aids was extended to under vassals as well as towns.

== In England ==
The custom of collecting aids arose in northern France, and was brought to England following the Norman Conquest of England in 1066. There, the three customary occasions for the collection of aid came to be the knighting of the eldest son, the marriage of the eldest daughter and when the lord needed to be ransomed. Custom also limited the amount that could be collected at each occasion. The English kings after the Conquest exploited their rights to aids extensively, although Henry I promised in his coronation charter to respect custom in the amounts and times he collected them. Records from the Pipe Rolls, however, show that Henry continued to exact more than custom allowed. Under Henry II, the royal government needed ever greater sums of money to operate, so it continued the practice of extorting the aids whenever possible for as much as possible. The 1168 aid for the marriage of Henry II's daughter was not only assessed on the nobles, but collected from the towns and from the royal lands also.

In England, Magna Carta limited the occasions on which a lord might impose an aid. Chapter XII of Magna Carta dealt with aids, limiting the ones that the king could collect to the three customary ones unless the barons agreed to the imposition of non-customary ones. Chapter XV then regulated the aids that the barons themselves could impose on their vassals, and stipulated that the king could not grant a license allowing a baron to impose a non-customary aid on his vassals.

Many examples of English feudal aids were published in Inquisitions and Assessments Relating to Feudal Aids, with Other Analogous Documents Preserved in the Public Record Office, A.D. 1284-1431. These volumes are arranged by traditional counties and includes some examples that were not strictly aids

== In Germany and Italy ==
Although gifts from vassals to lords happened in the German empire, they do not appear to have become compulsory nor have been institutionalized into formalized occasions when they were required. However, aids for the customary occasions were sometimes collected from German towns in the 12th and 13th centuries, as they are mentioned in town charters.

In Italy, the custom of feudal aids appears to have been introduced by the Normans when they conquered Sicily and southern Italy. Evidence for feudal aids in the northern part of Italy is late, and the custom may have been introduced from France or Sicily.

== Similar payments ==
Aids were distinct from the feudal incidents, which were collected when the vassal died. It was also distinct from the tallage, which was a tax imposed on the towns and the royal lands. Under Henry III, some voluntary taxes came to be called aids, but should not be confused with the feudal aids owed by vassals, which continued to be collected. Bishops sometimes imposed aids, for similar occasions such as making a pilgrimage to Rome or aid the construction of cathedrals and churches.

== Problems ==
The historian Susan Reynolds notes that the evidence for feudal aids only dates from the 11th century, rendering the view that it arose earlier in a requirement of a vassal to give aid to his lord somewhat suspect. She also notes that although the classic view of the aid was that it was raised from holders of fiefs, in reality it was collected from peasants more often than from nobles. The earliest notations of feudal aids being collected do not imply a lord-vassal relationship, which makes some traditional aspects of their early history suspect.

== See also ==
History of the English fiscal system
