= Government in Norman and Angevin England =

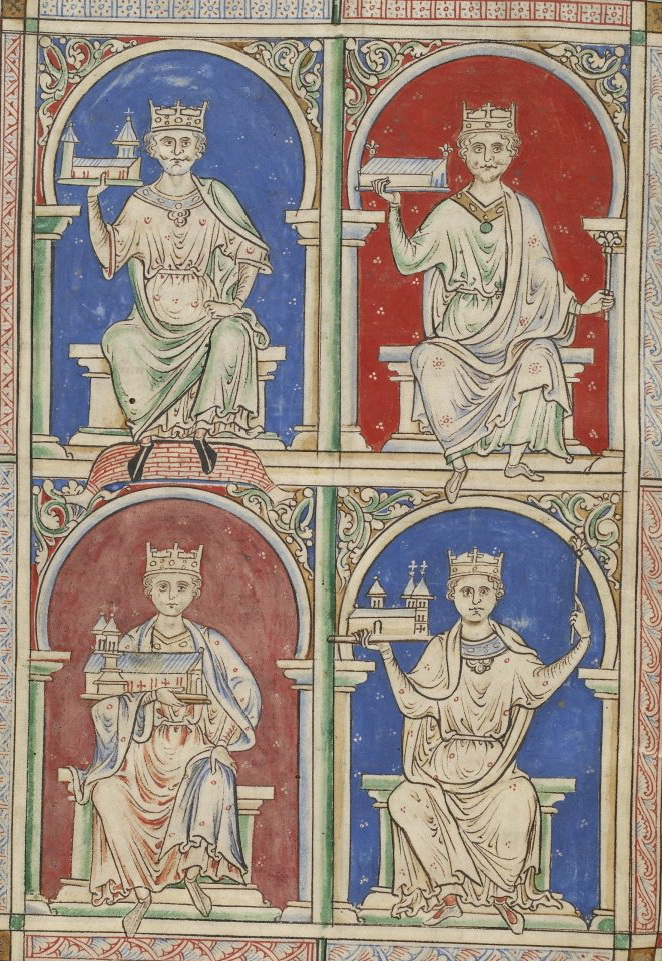
England's four Norman kings depicted in Matthew Paris' 13th century Historia Anglorum. Row 1: William I and William II. Row 2: Henry I and Stephen.

From the Norman Conquest of 1066 to the death of King John in 1216, England was governed by the Norman and Plantagenet dynasties. The Norman kings preserved and built upon the institutions of Anglo-Saxon government. They also introduced new institutions, in particular, formalized feudalism. Government in late medieval England continued to develop from these trends after 1215.

== Historical context ==
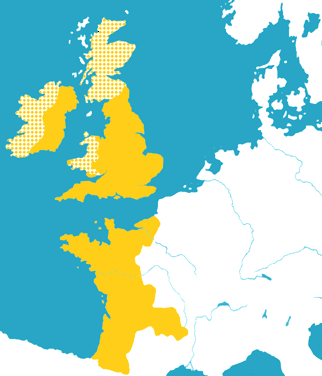
The Angevin Empire during the reign of Henry II

William the Conqueror (r. 1066–1087) inherited a sophisticated Anglo-Saxon government. He gradually replaced the Anglo-Saxon aristocracy with Anglo-Normans and introduced feudalism to England. Nevertheless, government institutions remained essentially unchanged. The Conqueror's sons, William II (r. 1087–1100) and Henry I (r. 1100–1135), succeeded him. Henry died without a legitimate male heir.

Henry designated his daughter, Empress Matilda, as his successor, but his nephew Stephen (r. 1135–1154) claimed the throne. The resulting civil war, known as the Anarchy, weakened royal authority and ended in a negotiated settlement whereby Matilda's son succeeded Stephen as Henry II. Henry was the first Angevin king of England, followed by his sons Richard I and John. The Angevin kings ruled over extensive possessions in the British Isles and France, known as the Angevin Empire.

As a result of their cross-Channel empires, the Norman and Angevin kings spent little time in England. This situation did not change until the reign of King John, who lost most of his French lands. John was the first English king since the Conquest to spend large amounts of time in England; however, his tyrannical behavior turned the barons against him. They forced John to agree to Magna Carta, which would have critical constitutional implications for England's late medieval government.

== Feudalism ==
Anglo-Saxon land law recognised several types of land tenure. Bookland was property granted by charter to a person with outright ownership, while loanland was leased temporarily. For a benefice, the recipient (such as a parish priest) was granted the income from the property without having ownership. These forms of land tenure created weak bonds between lords and vassals that were constantly being dissolved and reformed.

The Normans introduced feudalism, which created stronger and multi-generational ties between lords and vassals and became the basis of English land law. William the Conqueror claimed ownership of all land in England, (Note: In the 21st century, all land in England and Wales continues to be legally owned by the Crown. Individuals can only possess an estate in land or an interest in land.) making all Englishmen directly or indirectly tenants of the Crown. He confiscated estates wholly owned by Anglo-Saxon lords and granted them to his Norman followers as fiefs. The king granted the use of a fief to his vassal and the vassal's heirs in return for homage, fealty, and specified service (such as knight-service). The fief-holder was a tenant, not the owner of the fief. He could not sell the land or give it away; however, he could sub-let land to his tenants in return for their service in a process called subinfeudation.

Vassals who held land directly from the Crown were called tenants-in-chief. According to Domesday Book, the king had around 500 tenants-in-chief. Of these, 170 were wealthy enough to be considered feudal barons. Tenants-in-chief were obligated to fight personally for the king, but they also had to contribute knights to the king's service. A knight's estate was called a knight's fee, and It was large enough to support one knight in return for 40 days of military service a year. Besides knight-service, land could also be held in return for non-military service (called serjeanty). Some church land was held by knight-service, while other property was held by frankalmoign (the obligation to pray and say masses for the lord's soul).

If a lord failed to uphold his responsibilities to his vassals (to protect his vassals and fairly exercise his feudal rights), a vassal could renounce his fealty through the ritual act of defiance known as diffidation (Latin: diffidatio). Armed rebellion against the king, therefore, was not treason as long as the baron had made diffidation. Loss of land held from the king was the only consequence, but most rebellious barons were restored to royal favour.

== Crown ==
=== Becoming king ===
In this period, a king had greater latitude to determine his own successor. Primogeniture (the rule that the eldest son inherits) was not yet definitive. William the Conqueror became king by right of conquest, and he could dispose of England as he saw fit. For this reason, his eldest son, Robert Curthose, inherited the Duchy of Normandy as was customary, while his second oldest son, William Rufus, was given England.

A king's nominated heir was not always accepted, especially when the heir was female. In 1116, Henry I required the barons to swear fealty to his son, William Adelin. After William's death on the White Ship, Henry designated his daughter, Empress Matilda, as his heir and made the barons swear fealty to her on three occasions. In 1133, Henry designated Matilda's infant son, Henry FitzEmpress, as his heir and required the barons to swear fealty. Matilda was unpopular both for being a woman and because she was married to Geoffrey Plantagenet, Count of Anjou—Normandy's enemy. After Henry I died, Matilda's cousin, Stephen of Blois, won support for his accession by making concessions to various barons. The civil war between Stephen and Matilda ended after Stephen adopted Henry FitzEmpress, later Henry II, as his son and heir. In the process, Stephen's own sons were disinherited.

Richard I initially nominated as heir Arthur of Brittany, his nephew. After Arthur fell into the French king's custody, Richard decided that his brother John would inherit the throne.

At times, Norman kings claimed election as a "useful fiction" to bolster their legitimacy. Henry I had himself elected by a small group of barons at Winchester after his older brother, William Rufus, died in a hunting accident. This hurried election was part of Henry's attempt to bypass his elder brother Robert's claims to the throne.

==== Interregnum and coronation ====
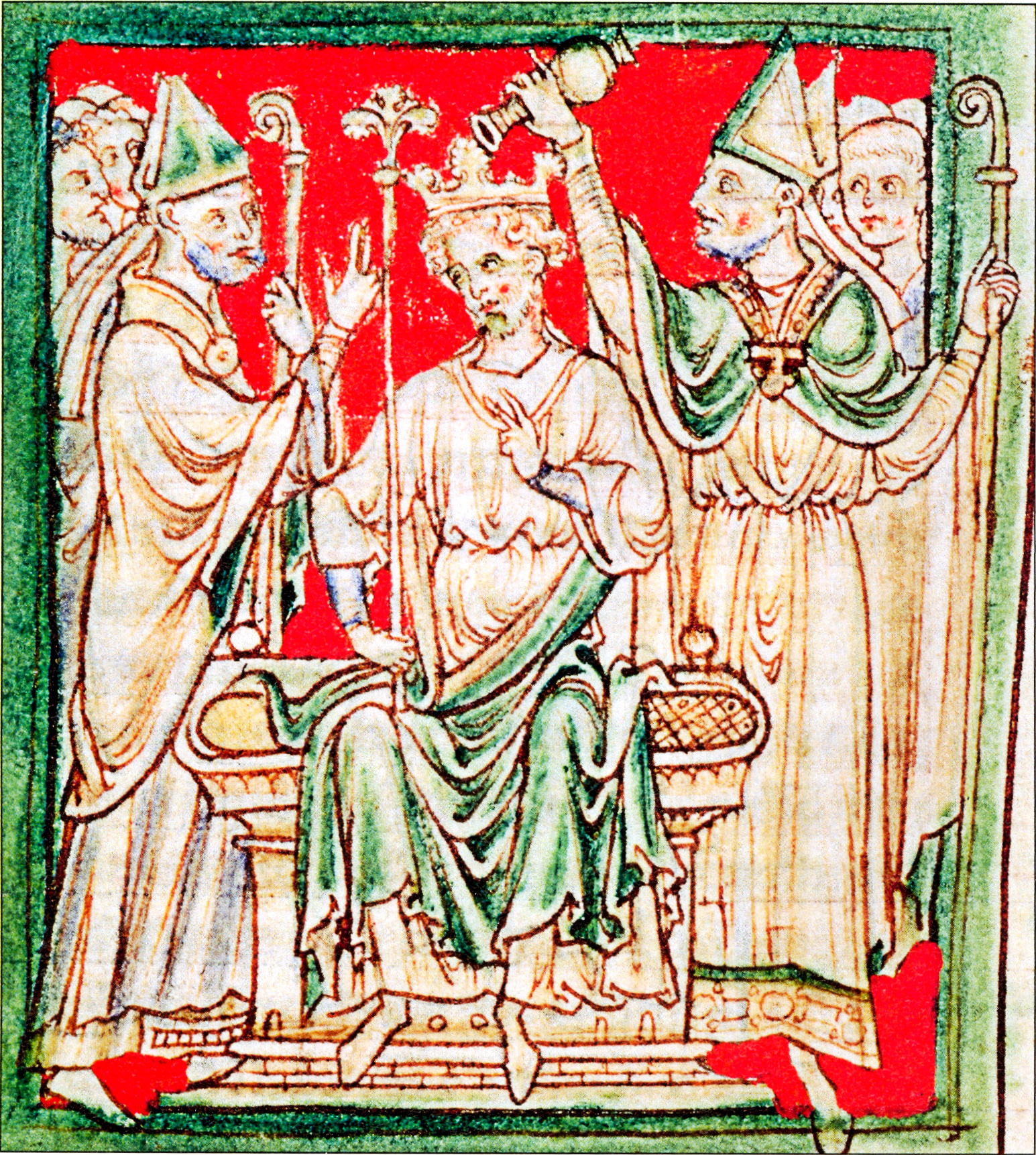
Richard I being anointed during his coronation in Westminster Abbey as depicted in a 13th-century chronicle

Henry II added "dei gratia" (Latin for "by the grace of God") to the royal style, but the idea that kings rule by divine sanction was much older. For this reason, no one could be called a king until he received coronation. Before coronation, he was a feudal prince styled "Lord of the English". King John illustrated this practice by using the title "Lord of Ireland" rather than "King of Ireland", as he was never crowned in Ireland.

The time between the death of the previous monarch and a coronation was called an interregnum. These lasted a month on average but could be shorter or longer based on political circumstances. It lasted only three days between the death of William Rufus and the crowning of Henry I, who wanted to secure the throne for himself while his elder brother Robert Curthose was in Normandy. The political uncertainty during an interregnum meant it could be dangerous for the country. The kings of medieval France avoided interregnums by practicing coregency, where kings had their heirs crowned as co-kings. Coregency occurred in medieval England only once when Henry II had his eldest son, Henry the Young King, crowned co-king.

Traditionally, the Archbishop of Canterbury crowned English kings at Westminster Abbey. As part of the ceremony, the king swore a three-fold oath to protect the church and Christian people, to prohibit crime, and to rule with justice and mercy. The clergy and people present were then asked by a bishop if they wanted him as king, to which they replied, "we wish it and grant it". The king was then anointed with chrism, symbolizing the sacramental character of kingship. After the anointing, he was crowned. The physical crown worn by kings symbolized all of the king's rights.

The tradition of the coronation oath acknowledged that monarchs owed certain obligations to their subjects in return for obedience. Henry I further developed this concept, promising to reform William Rufus's abuses and restore the good laws of Edward the Confessor and William the Conqueror. He also promised to demand only those feudal duties established by custom. These promises were confirmed in the Coronation Charter (also known as the Charter of Liberties). Stephen issued similar charters, and Henry II reconfirmed his grandfather's charter. While Norman and Angevin kings tended to break the promises in the charters, they provided the barons with political precedents in their struggle with King John, ultimately producing Magna Carta.

=== Rights and authority ===
Historian Bryce Lyon described the Norman kings as autocrats and "masters almost without limitation". The Glanvill legal treatise, written during the reign of Henry II, states "quod principi placuit legis habet vigorem" (in English "what pleases the prince has the force of law"). While the coronation oath and charters provided theoretical limits to the king's powers, these promises were often broken.

The king enjoyed an extensive royal prerogative. He could arbitrarily levy taxes and enact new legislation with or without the advice and approval of the curia regis. The Anglo-Saxon kings had issued formal law codes, but Anglo-Norman legislation took the form of royal edicts. The king had authority over the coinage and the "king's highway" (major roads). He could not be sued and had exclusive jurisdiction over certain crimes.

As a feudal lord, the king had certain rights and powers over his vassals. His tenants-in-chief owed him military service or scutage payments. In addition to non-feudal taxation, the barons paid the king customary feudal payments called reliefs and aids. Preventing the king from abusing these feudal rights was one of the goals of Magna Carta.

== Central administration ==
=== Chief Justiciar ===
Since Norman kings spent most of their time in Normandy, appointing agents to govern England in their absence became necessary. In 1109, Henry I appointed Roger of Salisbury the first chief justiciar. It remained the most powerful office under the king throughout the Norman and Angevin periods until it was abolished in 1234.

The chief justiciar functioned as the king's chief minister and viceroy with particular responsibility over financial and legal matters. He supervised the royal household and the exchequer. As chief royal justice, he directed the procedures of the curia regis and the itinerant justices. The justiciar's authority continued even during an interregnum. Historians H. G. Richardson and G. O. Sayles theorise "that in some way royal authority resided in the justiciar" during an interregnum.

=== Royal household ===
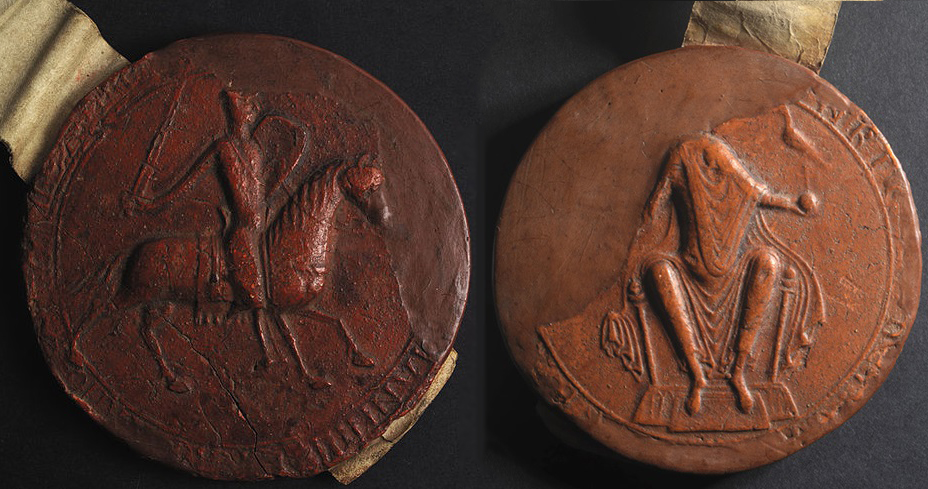
The Great Seal of Henry II. On one side, the king is seated as lawgiver and judge. On the reverse, he is mounted and armed as a warrior-king.

The king and his court were itinerant during this period. Not only did kings divide their time between England and Normandy, but within England, kings constantly traveled throughout the kingdom with the small council and the royal household staff. King John's household, for example, moved an average of 13 times a month.

The most important household department was the chancery (writing office). The chancellor led the chancery and had custody of the great seal. The master of the writing office assisted him. Once the chancery produced a royal document, the chancellor affixed the great seal to it in the presence of royal witnesses. The Normans continued to issue charters and writs like the Anglo-Saxons, but they also combined elements of both into the writ-charter. Under the Angevins, the writ-charter developed into letters close and letters patent.

Under the Anglo-Saxon kings, all revenue was received and disbursed by the king's chamber and wardrobe. The chamber, like the rest of the household, was itinerant. Under the Normans, the chamber continued to serve as the household's financial department, but a master chamberlain now led it.

=== Exchequer ===
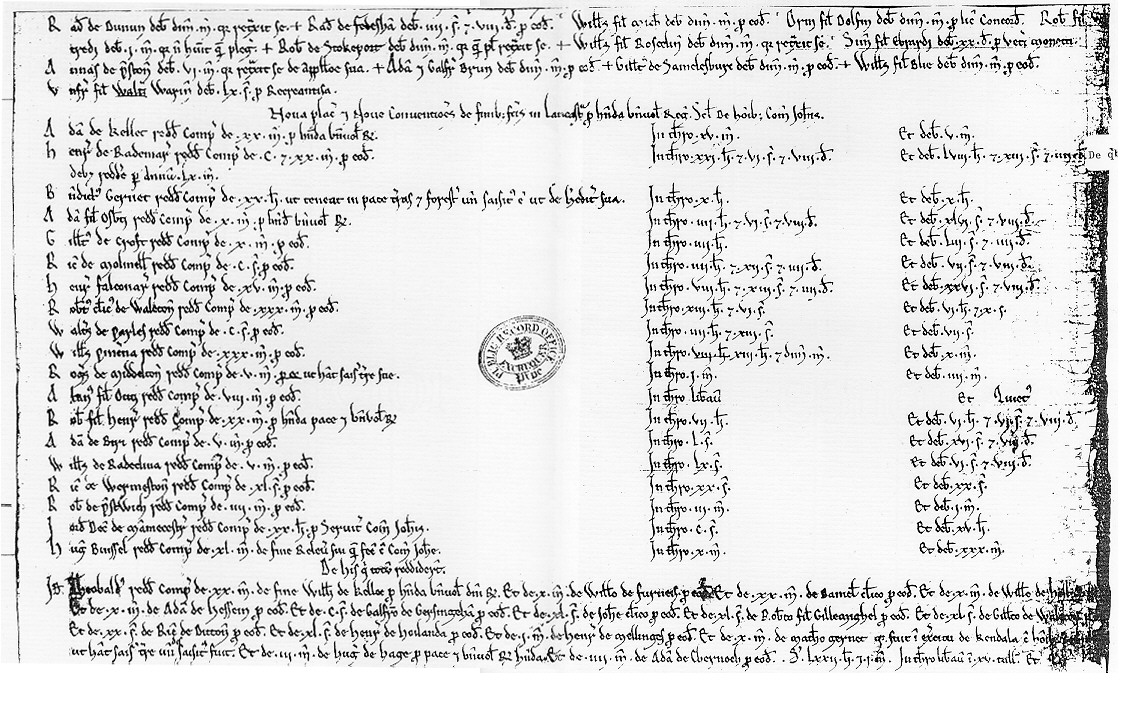
A pipe roll, part of the increasingly sophisticated system of royal governance at the turn of the 13th century

Edward the Confessor (r. 1042–1066) established a stationary treasury at Winchester to store surplus wealth. During the reign of Henry I, the treasury became independent of the chamber and controlled royal finances. It received and disbursed most royal income and provided the chamber with funds. A treasurer and assistant clerks staffed the treasury.

Sometime in Henry's reign, the treasury was moved to London and absorbed into the Exchequer, named for the checkered cloth used as an abacus. The Exchequer became the government's primary financial department. It gave the chamber the money to pay for the government's operations and the privy purse. The lower exchequer or "exchequer of receipt" was the London treasury. It was staffed by the treasurer, two chamberlains, and other minor officials. Sheriffs paid county revenues to the lower exchequer. Financial records were kept on pipe rolls.

The upper exchequer or Court of Exchequer was an auditing board that examined the sheriffs' accounts each Easter and Michaelmas. The chief justiciar presided over the exchequer court. The chancellor and several barons of the exchequer also sat on the court. The barons were selected from among royal court and household officials.

==== Royal income ====
The king's primary sources of revenue were Crown lands (40 per cent), income from feudal rights (16 per cent), taxation (14 per cent), and profits of justice (12 per cent). (Note: Percentages are for the year 1130.)

While the king technically owned all land in England, the land kept directly under royal control (rather than granted to others as fiefs) was called Crown land or the royal demesne. According to Domesday Book, over 10 per cent of each county was royal demesne. In four counties, over 30 per cent of the land belonged to the king. This land generated income from peasant rents and the sale of crops and livestock. The king delegated supervision of royal manors in each county to the sheriff. The sheriff collected the income and paid the Crown a yearly fixed sum known as the county "farm".

The size of the Crown lands changed as land was alienated or newly acquired. Kings gave away land as a form of patronage. They received land through confiscations, escheat, and temporarily through wardship of under-aged heirs (the king received the estate's income until the heir reached adulthood). Like any other feudal lord, the king had the right to levy a tallage on the serfs and townsmen of his demesne. The king could also demand tallage from English Jews.

The king's barons were obligated to pay him a feudal aid when he knighted his son, married off his daughter, or had to be ransomed. When a baron died, his heir had to pay the king a feudal relief before he could inherit. As a feudal lord, the king was entitled to the military service of his vassals. But this could be replaced with a money payment called scutage. Levies became more frequent in the Angevin period. By the reign of King John, scutage was being levied every 18 months.

Kings could also levy a universal land tax called the geld. Under the Normans, it was usually levied annually at two shillings per hide. In 1130, it brought in £2,400. Collection of the geld was discontinued after 1162. In 1194, the government needed a large sum of money to ransom Richard I. It revived the land tax in the form of the carucage. This tax was levied five more times until 1224. In 1220, two shillings per hide produced £3,400.

In 1166, a new, more complex method of taxation was introduced to fund the Crusade. It taxed a percentage of movable property ("movables") and income. Similar taxes were collected in 1185 and 1188. The 1188 tax was known as the Saladin tithe because people were ordered to pay a tenth of all income and movables. Later, a 25 percent tax on movables and income was levied for Richard's ransom. John used this tax on several occasions. In 1207, he levied a "thirteenth" (8 percent) tax and collected £60,000. This was an extraordinary amount especially considering that John's ordinary revenue was only about £35,000.

Kings also made money from their judicial role. Writs could only be had for a fee. The Crown also made money from fines and forfeitures in criminal cases. Fines for violations of the Forest Law were also profitable.

== Curia Regis ==
Since the unification of England in the 10th century, kings had convened national councils of lay magnates and leading churchmen. The Anglo-Saxons called such councils witans. These councils were an important way for kings to maintain ties with powerful men in distant regions of the country. The witan had a role in making and promulgating legislation as well as making decisions concerning war and peace. They were also the venues for state trials, such as the trial of Earl Godwin in 1051.

After the Norman Conquest in 1066, the king received counsel from his curia regis (Latin for "king's court"). Some chroniclers continued to refer to the curia as a witan, and there were similarities between the two institutions. A small curia regis assisted the king on a permanent basis. Kings periodically enlarged the curia regis by summoning large numbers of barons and bishops to discuss important national business and promulgate legislation. The enlarged curia regis was called a magnum concilium (Latin for "great council").

=== Small council ===
The small curia regis was a permanent council that assisted the king with routine government business. Members included the justiciar and household officers (chancellor, chamberlain, seneschal, butler, and clerics). In addition, there were always a few bishops and barons who were valued advisers to the king. It witnessed the granting of royal charters, oversaw royal finances, and supervised local officers. The small council decided litigation, and local cases frequently came before it as it traveled with the king. The king could enact laws through the small council but was not required to.

=== Great council ===
The curia regis was a feudal court. As tenants-in-chief, earls, barons, bishops, and abbots owed their lord the king their attendance and advice when summoned to his court. Royal household officers such as the chancellor, chamberlain, marshal, and constable attended as well. In the Norman era, the largest attendance at these great councils was 75. The average attendance was 50. While some barons always attended, the composition varied each time the curia met, depending on who received a writ of summons from the king. The great council met regularly at Easter, Whitsuntide, and Christmas. It was assembled at other times when necessary.

Great councils allowed kings to consult with their leading subjects, but such consultation rarely resulted in a change in royal policy. According to historian Judith Green, "these assemblies were more concerned with ratification and publicity than with debate". Historian Bryce Lyon argued that great councils were used as royal propaganda. Kings did not need the curia's permission to enact legislation, but they occasionally sought its assent. The Constitutions of Clarendon, for example, were produced at the Clarendon council of 1164.

The curia regis could authorise the collection of customary feudal aids. For example, it granted an aid for the marriage of Henry I's daughter Matilda to Emperor Henry V of Germany. Nevertheless, it had no power over nonfeudal taxation, and kings levied geld whenever they wished. The magnum concilium continued to be the setting of state trials, such as the trial of Thomas Becket. It also tried civil disputes between the great men of the realm.

The years between 1189 and 1215 were a time of transition for the great council. The cause of this transition were new financial burdens imposed by the Crown to finance the Third Crusade, ransom Richard I, and pay for the series of Anglo-French wars fought between the Plantagenet and Capetian dynasties. In 1188, a precedent was established when the great council granted Henry II the Saladin tithe. In granting this tax, the great council was acting as representatives for all taxpayers.

The likelihood of resistance to national taxes made consent politically necessary. It was convenient for kings to present the great council as a representative body capable of consenting on behalf of all within the kingdom. Increasingly, the kingdom was described as the communitas regni (Latin for "community of the realm") and the barons as their natural representatives. But this development also created more conflict between kings and the baronage as the latter attempted to defend what they considered the rights belonging to the king's subjects.

John's reign saw the first issuance of Magna Carta. Clause 12 was the origin of the principle of "no taxation without representation". Clause 12 stated that certain taxes could only be levied "through the common counsel of our kingdom", and clause 14 specified that this common counsel was to come from bishops, earls, and barons.

== Local government ==
=== Counties ===
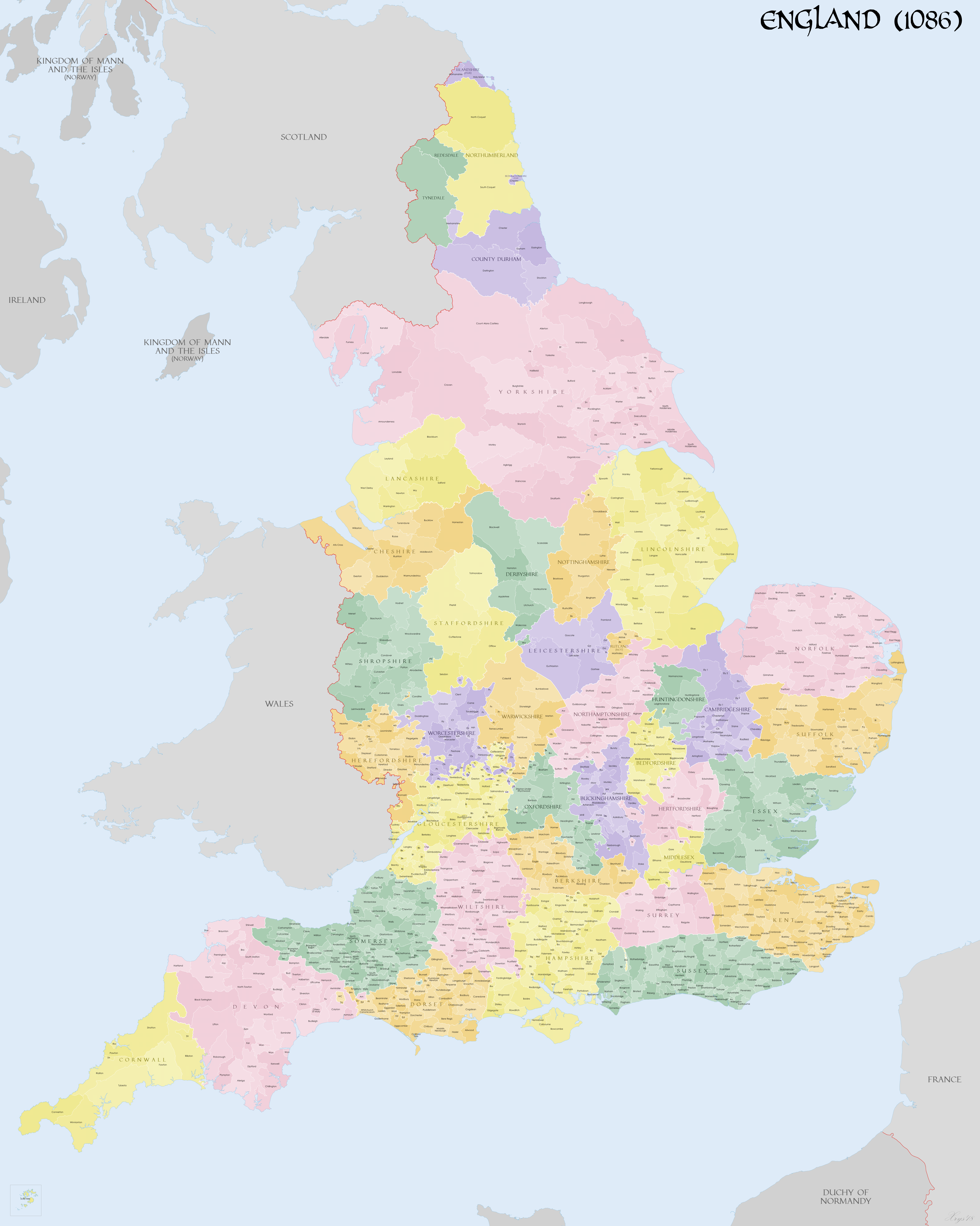
England in 1086 showing hundreds, wapentakes and wards

Before the Conquest, the largest and most important unit of local government was the shire. The shire system covered all of England except the far north. A shire was governed by the sheriff and the shire court. The Normans left this system largely unchanged, but they called the shire a county. The Normans extended the shire system into the north. The counties of Rutland, Lancashire, Westmorland, Cumberland, Durham, and Northumberland were created after the Conquest. England was ultimately divided into 39 counties, which existed with only minor boundary changes until 1974 when the Local Government Act 1972 went into effect.

The sheriff was appointed by the king and served at his pleasure. His jobs included:

- Presiding over the county court
- Presiding over the hundred courts (often represented by a subordinate)
- Empaneling juries to supply information for the king or to determine judicial facts
- Law enforcement (enforce court decisions, maintain order, assist the hue and cry, and make arrests)
- Chief military officer of the county
- Arranged transportation and provided guards to protect the king when he visited the county
- Sometimes acted as custodian of the royal castle
- Executed royal writs
- Collected taxes and fines
- Supervised royal lands and collected the county farm

Once a sheriff paid the county farm to the exchequer, he kept any excess revenue derived from royal lands. This made being sheriff financially rewarding and motivated men to pay for the office. Sheriffs were chosen from the ranks of barons, royal administrators, or local gentry. The first two Norman kings typically chose sheriffs from among the local barons, and shrievalties were in danger of becoming inherited offices. This trend was reversed under Henry I, who preferred his sheriffs to be clerks or knights drawn either from the royal household or the local civil service. These men were more loyal since they owed their success solely to royal patronage.

The palatine counties (such as Cheshire and Durham) enjoyed autonomy from royal control because they were located along the Welsh or Scottish borders. Among other things, the earl of Chester and the bishop of Durham appointed their own sheriffs. Kings sometimes granted counties to relatives for short periods. For example, Henry I gave his wife Adeliza the county of Shropshire. Henry's illegitimate son, Reginald de Dunstanville, was given Cornwall with the title of earl of Cornwall. Richard I gave his brother John six counties, but these were forfeited due to John's rebellion in 1194.

=== Boroughs ===
At the time of the Conquest, England was highly urbanised compared to other parts of Europe, even though only ten per cent of people lived in towns. The only legally recognised towns were the boroughs. Each county had at least one, which became the county town. It served as the sheriff's headquarters and was often the bishop's seat. Half a dozen towns could be called cities, the largest being London, York, and Winchester. London enjoyed self-government and was treated more like a shire than a town. In the reign of Richard I, London was recognized as a commune and the office of Lord Mayor was created.

Royal boroughs were part of the royal demesne, paid dues to the Crown, and received many privileges from the king. There were also seignorial boroughs and monastic boroughs. These were part of the demesne of lords or religious houses, and they received fewer privileges as a result.

=== Hundreds ===
Counties were divided into 628 smaller units called hundreds. The hundred court met every two to four weeks and was attended by local landholders. Twice a year the hundred court met with the sheriff presiding to ensure that every free adult male was part of a tithing. Members of a tithing were collectively responsible for one another's conduct in a system known as frankpledge. A tithing could be fined if it failed to detain criminals.

In late Anglo-Saxon and Norman times, hundreds were not yet established in Northern England and the Welsh border areas. Law enforcement was the responsibility of paramilitary "sergeants of the peace" under the control of local lords.

By the end of the 13th century, over half of all hundreds had been granted to barons, bishops, or abbeys. In these hundreds, the lord's representative presided over the hundred court, and the lord received the profits of justice. They had authority to punish petty theft and affray. They also could hang thieves caught red-handed.

=== Vills and manors ===
The smallest unit of English administration was the vill (or township). A vill could take the form of a collection of hamlets, a single village, or a small town. A delegation from each vill (including the priest, reeve, and four "of the better men of the township") might be required to attend the county court.

Those in bondage to a manor were called villeins. According to the law, villeins were subject to the authority of the lord of the manor. The lord even had his own manor court to enforce his rights. Nevertheless, unhappy villeins could collectively make life difficult for their lord through strikes, sabotage, and other forms of resistance. Lords tended to provide villeins with some self-government and adhered to the "custom of the manor" (recorded in custumals), which defined the rights and duties of the lord and his tenants. As suitors to the manor court, the villeins had the power to impose these customs on the working of the manor.

== Legal system ==
=== Central courts ===
The king was the fount of justice. Initially, important cases were heard coram rege (Latin for "in the presence of the king himself") with the advice of his curia regis. But the growth of the legal system required specialization, and the judicial functions of the curia regis were delegated to two courts sitting at Westminster Hall.

The Court of Common Pleas split from the Exchequer of Pleas in the 1190s. It had jurisdiction over civil cases (such as debts, property rights, and trespass). It was staffed by a chief justice of the Common Pleas and several other justices of the Common Pleas.

=== Local courts ===
The hundred court had jurisdiction over minor offenses and property disputes. Before the reign of Henry II, the shire or county court had a wide-ranging jurisdiction. Most land disputes and serious criminal cases were heard there. Henry I mandated that land disputes between vassals of two different lords were also to be heard in county court.

County courts met twice a year in Anglo-Saxon times, but some were meeting every three weeks by the 13th century. Local custom and tradition played a large role in the functioning of the county courts, and these customs varied from county to county. The court was presided over by the sheriff. Those required to attend court were called "suitors". The suitors were divided between large landowners ("barons of the shire" or barones comitatus in Latin) and small landowners (lesser freemen). The large landowners passed judgment, and the lesser freemen deferred to them.

Henry II instituted the general eyres in which a group of between two and nine itinerant justices were assigned a circuit of counties to visit. These circuits covered the whole country with the exception of Chester and Durham, which were exempt due to their special status. The eyre justices would stay in one county for several weeks to hear cases under their jurisdiction before moving on. Their jurisdiction included among other things the pleas of the Crown, cases initiated by royal writ, criminal cases, and issues touching the rights of the Crown (wardships, etc.). By 1189, there were around 35 itinerant judges, seven to nine judges per circuit.

The lord of a manor automatically enjoyed the right to hold a manorial court over his vassals and tenants. Manorial courts had jurisdiction over "debt under forty shillings, contracts and conventions made within the power of the lord, cattle wounding [and other sorts of things], damage to crops by animals, assault not leading to bloodshed, trespass or damaging of timber where the king's peace was not involved ..." Tenants-in-chief possessed fiefs called "honours" made up of many different manors scattered over several shires. The honour court had jurisdiction over all the honour's manors.

Cases could be transferred from a manorial court to the county court through a process called tolt. A case could be transferred from county court to the royal justices by a writ of pone. Royal justices often presided over special sessions of the county court.

=== Trials ===
In Norman times, court procedure involved the pleadings of the parties, information supplied by juries, documentary evidence, and witness testimony. In many cases, a compromise settlement was reached. When this was not possible, conclusive proof was sought through methods invoking divine intervention: trial by oath (compurgation) and trial by ordeal.

In criminal cases, three forms of ordeal were used: trial by hot iron, trial by cold water, and trial by combat. Trial by combat was introduced by the Normans and was frequently used when one person accused another of theft or murder. Civil cases involving property over 10 shillings were determined by battle as well.

==== Trial reform ====
Henry II introduced a number of legal reforms that mark the origins of the common law. In particular, the role of juries in both criminal and civil cases was expanded. A jury was a group of men who swore to give a truthful answer (a verdict) to a question asked of them. The Assize of Clarendon of 1166 required that juries of presentment identify those "accused or notoriously suspect of being a robber, murderer or thief" and provide this information to the itinerant judges when they visited the county. The jury did not yet decide innocence or guilt, which was still proven by ordeal.

In civil cases, such as land disputes, the Grand Assize of 1179 gave defendants the option of having the matter settled by a jury of twelve knights instead of trial by battle. Henry also introduced the petty assizes—procedures to allow speedy resolution of land disputes. These include novel disseisin, mort d'ancestor, and darrein presentment. Under the petty assizes, a plaintiff initiated proceedings by purchasing a writ from the chancery. The writ instructed the sheriff to choose a jury of 12 free men. The next time a royal justice was in the county, the parties and the jury would appear before him. For novel disseisin, the jury was to answer, "Was the plaintiff evicted unjustly and without judgment from an estate of which he was in peaceful possession?"

In 1215, the Fourth Lateran Council forbade clergy participation in trial by ordeal. In 1219, the Crown ordered justices to find an alternative and the jury trial was chosen. The first recorded criminal jury trial occurred at Westminster in 1220. The first juries differed from modern juries in that early jurors were local men with knowledge of the case. Their job was not to weigh evidence but to decide the facts of a case using their own knowledge.

=== Punishment ===
Punishments for serious crimes included execution by hanging and mutilation (such as blinding and castration). Lesser offenses were punished by amercements or financial penalties. The royal Fleet Prison in London was opened as early as the 1130s. The Assize of Clarendon required each county to have a jail in a borough or royal castle.

== Military ==
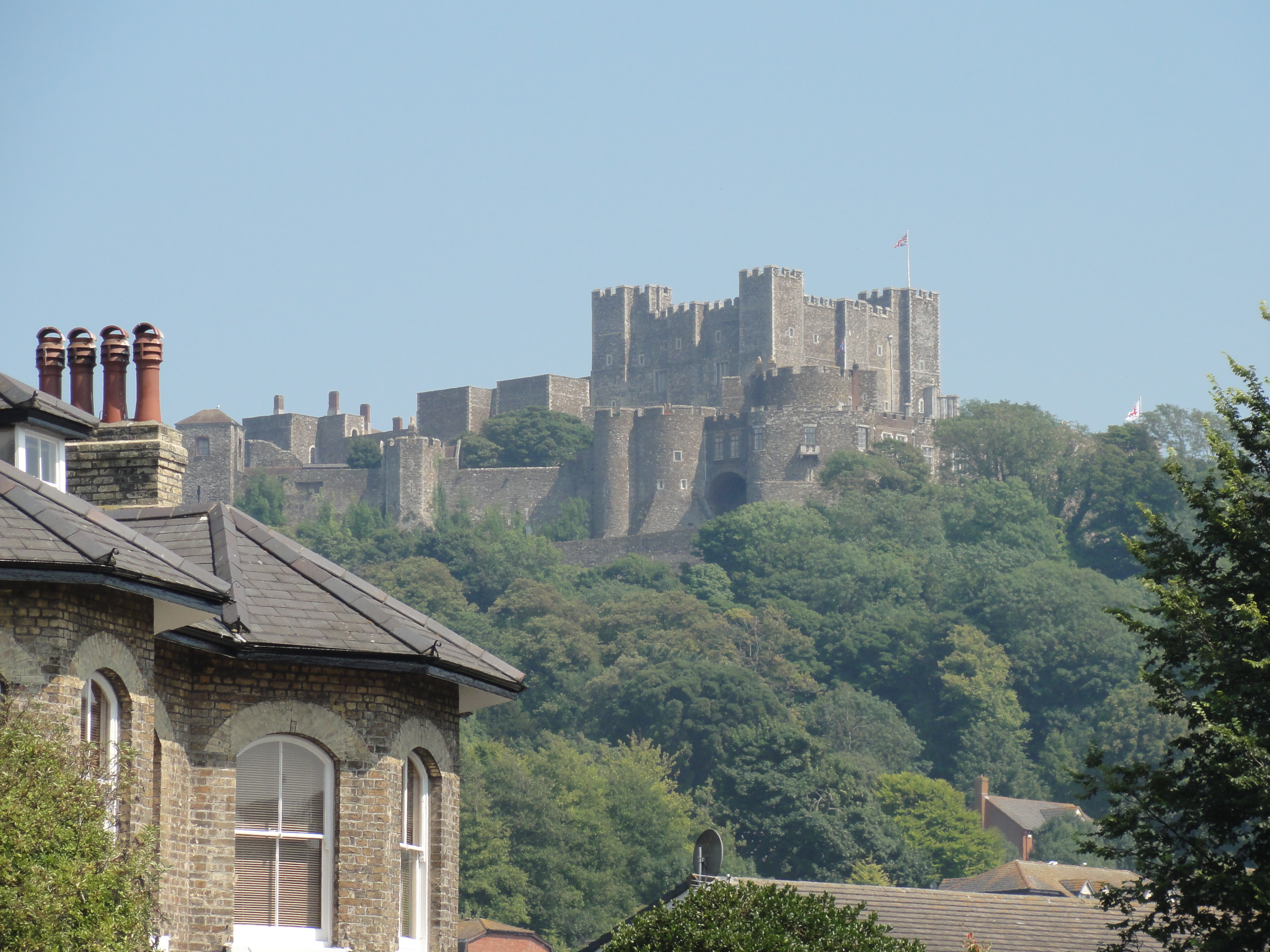
Dover Castle in Kent, overlooking the English Channel

In the Anglo-Saxon period, England had no standing army. The king and magnates retained professional household troops, and all free men were obligated to perform military service in the fyrd. In addition, holders of bookland were obligated to provide a certain number of men based on the number of hides they owned.

After the Norman Conquest, the king's household troops remained central to any royal army. But the Normans also introduced a new feudal element to the English military. The king's tenants-in-chief (his feudal barons) were obligated to provide mounted knights for service in the royal army or to garrison royal castles. The Normans brought castle building to England, and most shires had a royal castle in the charge of a royally appointed castellan. These were centers of royal administration and the location of royal mints.

The total number of knights owed was called the servitium debitum (Latin: "service owed"), and historian Richard Huscroft estimates this number was around 5,000. In reality, the servitium debitum was greater than any king would actually need in wartime. Its main purpose was for assessing how much scutage the king was owed. Scutage was used to pay for mercenaries, which were an important part of any Norman army.

The Anglo-Saxon fyrd or Norman arrière-ban remained an important element of military service and applied to all able-bodied freemen. Similar to the old Anglo-Saxon trinoda necessitas, royal vassals were obligated to contribute to the fortification of royal castles, to repair bridges, and to maintain roads.

== Bibliography ==
- Bartlett, Robert (2000). England Under the Norman and Angevin Kings, 1075-1225. New Oxford History of England. Clarendon Press. ISBN 9780199251018.
- Burt, Caroline (2013). Edward I and the Governance of England, 1272–1307. Cambridge Studies in Medieval Life and Thought. Cambridge University Press. ISBN 9781139851299.
- Downer, L. J., ed. (1972). Leges Henrici Primi. Oxford, UK: Clarendon Press. OCLC 389304.
- Fitzroy, Almeric (1928). The History of the Privy Council. London: John Murray.
- Green, Judith A. (1986). The Government of England under Henry I. Cambridge Studies in Medieval Life and Thought: Fourth Series. Cambridge: Cambridge University Press. doi:10.1017/CBO9780511560248. ISBN 9780511560248.
- Huscroft, Richard (2016). Ruling England, 1042–1217 (2nd ed.). Routledge. ISBN 978-1138786554.
- Jolliffe, J. E. A. (1961). The Constitutional History of Medieval England from the English Settlement to 1485 (4th ed.). Adams and Charles Black.
- Lyon, Ann (2016). Constitutional History of the UK (2nd ed.). Routledge. ISBN 978-1-317-20398-8.
- Lyon, Bryce (1980). A Constitutional and Legal History of Medieval England (2nd ed.). W. W. Norton & Company. ISBN 0-393-95132-4. 1st edition available to read online here.
- Maddicott, John (2009). "Origins and Beginnings to 1215". In Jones, Clyve (ed.). A Short History of Parliament: England, Great Britain, the United Kingdom, Ireland and Scotland. The Boydell Press. pp. 3–9. ISBN 978-1-843-83717-6.
- Maddicott, J. R. (2010). The Origins of the English Parliament, 924-1327. Oxford University Press. ISBN 978-0-199-58550-2.
- Potter, Harry (2015). Law, Liberty and the Constitution: A Brief History of the Common Law. Boydell Press. ISBN 9781783270118.
- Ranulf de Glanville (1932). Woodbine, George Edward (ed.). De legibus et consuetudinibus regni Anglia. Yale University Press.
- Richardson, H. G.; Sayles, G. O. (1963). The Governance of Mediaeval England from the Conquest to Magna Carta. Edinburgh: Edinburgh University Press. ISBN 978-0-85224-102-8.
- Starkey, David (2010). Crown and Country: A History of England through the Monarchy. HarperCollins Publishers. ISBN 978-0007307715.
- Warren, W. L. (1987). The Governance of Norman and Angevin England, 1086–1272. The Governance of England. Vol. 2. Stanford, CA, US: Stanford University Press. ISBN 0-8047-1307-3.
