= Infangthief and outfangthief =

Concepts in Anglo-Saxon law

Infangthief and outfangthief (Note: Variously spelled infangenthef and outfangenthef, infangtheof and outfangtheof, &c.) were privileges granted to feudal lords (and various corporate bodies such as abbeys and cities) under Anglo-Saxon law by the kings of England. They permitted their bearers to execute summary justice (including capital punishment) on thieves within the borders of their own manors or fiefs.

The terms are frequently attested in royal writs and charters using formulas such as "sake and soke, toll and team, and infangthief", which specified the usual rights accompanying grants of land.

== Scope ==
Infangthief (Old English: infangene-þēof, lit. "thief seized within") applied to thieves captured within a landowner's estate, although it sometimes permitted them to be chased in other jurisdictions and brought back for trial. Under the 13th-century Leges Edwardi Confessoris, the privilege was restricted to the lord's "own thief"—that is, the lord's serfs and staff. According to Henry de Bracton, the privilege was further restricted to those caught in flagrante delicto or in possession of the stolen object.

Outfangthief (Old English: ūtfangene-þēof, lit. "thief seized without") is a more problematic term, as it is unattested prior to a forged charter included in the 3rd edition of William of Malmesbury's Deeds of the English Kings (c. 1135). (Note: A manuscript of the same era contains a copy of a possibly genuine charter of Egbert's, including the equivalent Latin phrase cum furis comprehensione intus et foris.) It seems to have initially been understood as the right to try a thief among the lord's own men wheresoever he might be apprehended, but this understanding is explicitly rejected by Bracton's c. 1235 Laws and Customs of England and the c. 1290 Fleta, which instead give it the meaning of permitting thieves captured on the lord's land to be tried by his court regardless of the thief's own origin. The Fleta further states that the lord had the right to hang thieves from among his own men on his own gallows, once they had been condemned by the jurisdiction where they had been captured.

The thief's captor was given a choice between summarily executing him—the usual fate for the poor—or "amercing" him, ransoming him for a fine set according to his rank.

Such privileges had several advantages: they were profitable, helped to maintain discipline on the estate, and identified the privilege-holder as a figure of authority. They remained in use after the Norman Conquest as a standard right given to local lords and did not finally fall into disuse until the time of Edward III. Even then, they continued to be asserted for a considerable time afterwards in Halifax, West Yorkshire.

== Examples ==
According to the Anglo-Saxon Chronicle, in 963 AD King Edgar granted a charter to Bishop Æthelwold for the minster of Medeshamstede (afterwards Peterborough) and attached villages. The charter included the grant of "sack and sock, toll and team, and infangthief".

== See also ==
- Halifax Gibbet
