= Manorial court =

Lowest court of law in England and Germanic countries during the feudal period

The manorial courts were the lowest courts of law in England during the feudal period. They had a civil jurisdiction limited both in subject matter and territory. They dealt with matters over which the lord of the manor had jurisdiction, primarily torts, local contracts and land tenure, and their powers only extended to those who lived within the lands of the manor: the demesne and such lands as the lord had enfeoffed to others, and to those who held land therein. Historians have divided manorial courts into those that were primarily seignorial – based on feudal responsibilities – and those based on separate delegation of authority from the monarch. There were three types of manorial courts: the court of the honour; the court baron; and the court customary, also known as the halmote court.

Each manor had its own laws promulgated in a document called the custumal, and anyone in breach of those laws could be tried in a manorial court. The earlier Anglo-Saxon method of trial by ordeal or of compurgation was modified by the Normans into trial by a jury made up of 12 local freemen. The lord or his steward would be the chairman, whilst the parish clerk would write the record on the manorial rolls.

== Manorial courts ==
The three types of manorial court were distinguished by the importance of those who made use of them. The court of honour was for the manor's chief tenants, the court baron for other free tenants, and the court customary was for unfree tenants.

=== Court of the honour ===
The honour court, also known as the curia ducis ("duke's court") or curia militum ("soldiers' court"), was made up of the most important of a lord's tenants, particularly those who owed him knight service. Unlike the other two types of manorial court its jurisdiction could extend over a number of manors. Dealing as it did with the most important of the lord's tenants it was initially the principal manorial court, and may have acted as a superior court of appeal for the lower manorial courts, at least until 1267.

=== Court baron ===
The main business of the court baron (i.e., a “baron’s court”) was the resolution of disputes involving a lord's free tenants within a single manor, to enforce the feudal services owed to the lord of the manor by his tenants, and to admit new tenants who had acquired copyholds by inheritance or purchase, for which they were obliged to pay a fine to the lord of the manor. The English jurist Edward Coke described the court in his The Compleate Copyholder (1644) as "the chief prope and pillar of a manor which no sooner faileth than the manor falleth to the ground". The court baron was constituted by the lord of the manor or his steward and a representative group of tenants known as the manorial homage, whose job was to make presentations to the court and act as a jury.

The court baron was originally held every three weeks, although its sittings became increasingly infrequent during the 14th century, and by the 15th century it was often convened only twice a year. Those required to attend were summoned to appear, often by an announcement in church on Sunday or by a notice pinned to the church door. "Reasonable notice" had to be given, usually three days. Attendance at the court was a feudal duty, and those who failed to appear could be amerced, (Note: "Amerced" was a medieval legal term derived from the Anglo-Norman ammercier, which means to assess or to fine. The word ultimately derives from the French ester en la merci, "to be at the mercy [of]".) i.e. arbitrarily fined. After 1267 however, generally only a manor's unfree tenants could be compelled to attend.

By the 13th century compilations of precedents such as Le Court de Baron had begun to appear, partly to standardise and formalise the proceedings of the courts baron, but also in response to increasing competition from the common law courts, which were administered nationwide under the authority of the monarch. As it became increasingly acknowledged by the legal establishment during the 15th and 16th centuries that custom had "a secure place in law", plaintiffs were able to resort to the common law courts to resolve their differences over tenure rather than the court baron.

=== Court customary ===
The court customary, or halmote court, was the equivalent of the court baron for the lord's unfree tenants. As the use of the court baron declined, the court customary became the predominant type of manorial court, and gradually the court's distinction between free and unfree tenants disappeared.

== Royal courts ==
In some cases the manorial court functioned as a de facto court leet.

The lord of the manor could be given a post by the central government, such as sheriff or officer in charge of the county, in return for a small payment. In these cases the manorial court's jurisdiction could in effect become county-wide.

Alternatively, the lord could acquire a franchise of the Crown to hold court for criminal matters. This jurisdiction was that of court leet and view of frankpledge (the two terms define the same assembly), the manor freemen being the jury of a "crown" court within the manor's area.

== See also ==
- Manor house
- Manorialism
