= History of English law =

History of English law is the history of the legal system and laws of England.

Coverage of the history of English law is provided by:

- Fundamental Laws of England
- History of English land law
- History of English contract law
- History of English criminal law
- History of trial by jury in England
- History of the courts of England and Wales

== See also ==
- Anglo-Saxon law
- Commentaries on the Laws of England (book) 1765, by Sir William Blackstone
- Common law
- English parliamentary history
- Institutes of the Lawes of England (book) 1628, by Sir Edward Coke
- Law and order in Norman England
