= Toll and team =

Concept in Anglo-Saxon and Anglo-Norman law

Toll and team (also spelled thol and theam) were related privileges granted by the Crown to landowners under Anglo-Saxon and Anglo-Norman law. First known from a charter of around 1023, the privileges usually appeared as part of a standard formula in charters granting privileges to estate-holders, along the lines of "with sac and soc, toll and team, infangthief and outfangthief" and so on.

Toll was the right granted to a landowner to impose a payment on the sale or passage of goods or cattle on his lands, or alternatively to be exempt from the tolls of others.

Team was originally a grant of jurisdiction, allowing the holding of a court to judge people accused of wrongful possession of goods or cattle, or granting the right to obtain the profits from such a court. The term has the literal meaning in Old English of "line", referring to the tracing of a line of ownership. By the 12th century, however, the original meaning had largely been forgotten as the institution of team had fallen into obsolescence. It continued to be used as part of the standard formula of rights in charters but was given various alternative meanings by legal writers.

== See also ==
- Legal doublet and Irreversible binomials: this phrase is an example of each
