= Tenement (law) =

Holder of a legal interest in real estate

A tenement (from the Latin tenere to hold), in law, is anything that is held, rather than owned. This usage is a holdover from feudalism, which still forms the basis of property law in many common law jurisdictions, in which the monarch alone owned the allodial title to all the land within his kingdom.

Under feudalism, land itself was never privately "owned" but rather was "held" by a tenant (from Latin teneo "to hold") as a fee, being merely a legal right over land known in modern law as an estate in land. This was held from a superior overlord, (a mesne lord), or from the crown itself in which case the holder was termed a tenant-in-chief, upon some manner of service under one of a variety of feudal land tenures. The thing held is called a tenement, the holder is called a tenant, the manner of his holding is called a tenure, and the superior is called the landlord, or lord of the fee. These forms are still preserved in law, even though feudalism itself is extinct, because all real estate law has developed from them over centuries.

Feudal land tenure existed in many varieties. The sole surviving form in the United States is that species of freehold known as free socage. Here the service to be performed is known and fixed, and not of a base or servile nature; the "lord of the fee" is the State itself, and the service due to this "lord" is payment of the taxes upon the real estate. The major consequences, in the modern world, of this feudal approach, as distinguished from ownership, are, first, the forfeiture of the tenement upon failure to perform the service (that is, non-payment of taxes), and second, the doctrine of eminent domain, whereby the "lord of the fee" might take back the estate, provided he make just compensation. Also existing in a vestigial form is the concept of escheat, under which an estate of a holder without heirs returns to the ownership of the state.

A side effect of this is that government entities do not pay real estate taxes to other government entities since government entities own the land rather than hold the land. Localities that depend on real estate taxes to provide services are often put at a disadvantage when the state or federal government acquires a piece of land. Sometimes, to mollify local public opinion, the state or federal government may volunteer to make payments in lieu of taxes to local governments.

== See also ==
- Contenement
- Appurtenance
