= Appurtenance =

Something accompanying or subordinate to another larger entity

An appurtenance is something subordinate to or belonging to another larger, principal entity, that is, an adjunct, satellite, or accessory that generally accompanies something else. The word derives from Latin appertinere 'to appertain'.

== Usage ==
In a legal context, an appurtenance refers to a right, privilege, or improvement belonging to or that accompanies a principal property. For example, the Supreme Court of Minnesota has defined appurtenance as "That which belongs to something else. Something annexed to another thing more worthy." Applying this definition, an empty portion of land behind an adjoining house that is regarded as that house's backyard may be an appurtenance to the house. The idea being expressed is that the backyard "belongs" to the house, which is the more significant of the two properties.

In Gestalt theory, appurtenance (or "belongingness") is the relation between two things seen which exert influence on each other. For example, fields of color exert influence on each other. "A field part x is determined in its appearance by its 'appurtenance' to other field parts. The more x belongs to the field part y, the more will its whiteness be determined by the gradient xy, and the less it belongs to the part z, the less will its whiteness depend on the gradient xz."

In lexicology, an appurtenance is a modifier that is appended or prepended to another word to coin a new word that expresses "belongingness". In the English language, appurtenances are most commonly found in toponyms and demonyms, for example, 'Israeli', 'Bengali' etc. have an -i suffix of appurtenance.

== See also ==
- Fixture (property law)
- Tenement (law)
- Contenement
