= Law and order in Norman England =

Law and Punishment in England between 1066 and 1154

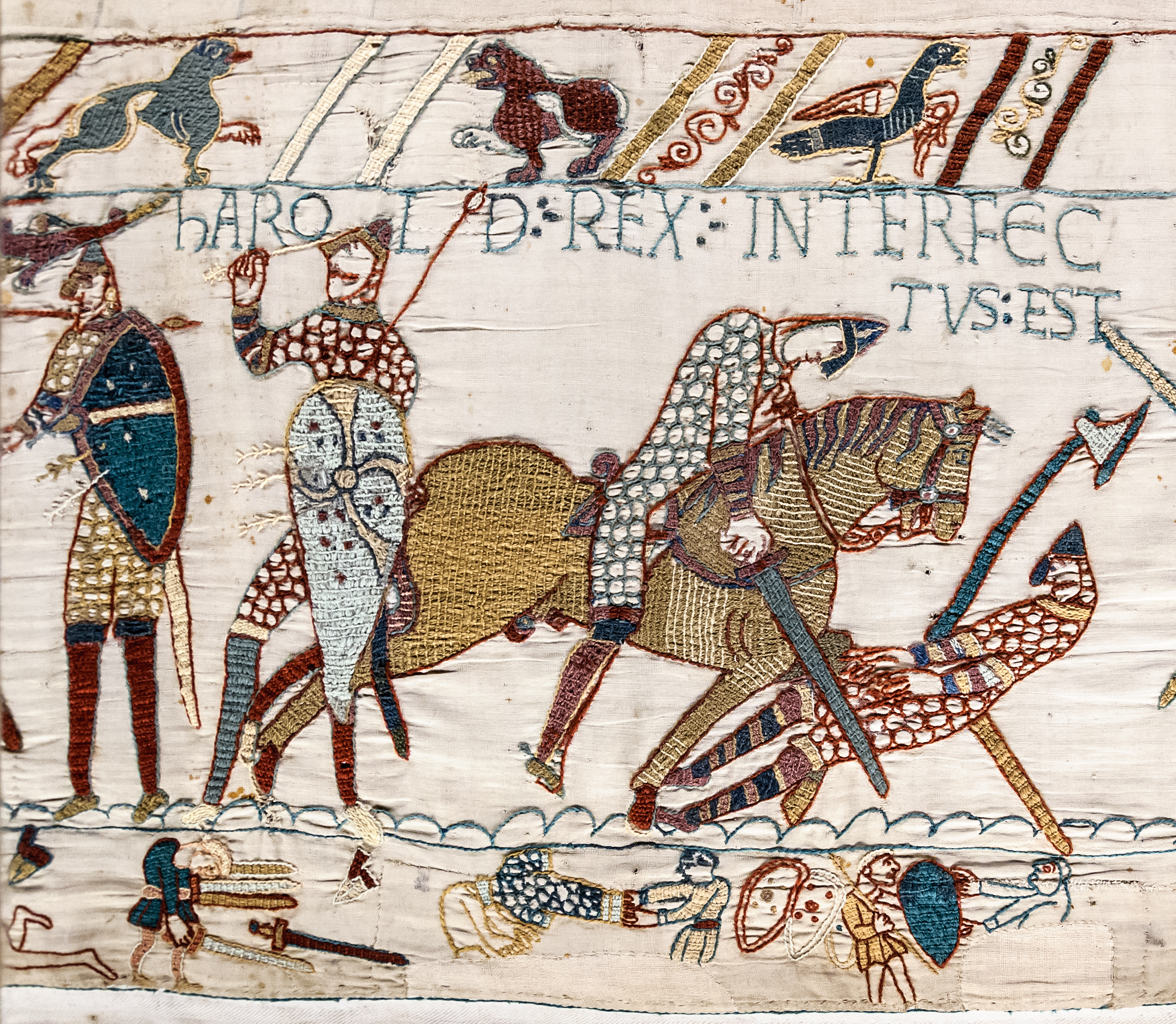
- Date: 1066–1154
- Location: Kingdom of England
- Cause: Norman Conquest

== Background ==
Norman law in England came following the Conquest of 1066, where William the Conqueror kept most of the Anglo-Saxon legal system, whilst introducing some changes. Rather than completely replacing the existing system, William adapted many Anglo-Saxon institutions to strengthen Norman control over the country. William also introduced new laws and harsher punishments designed to discourage rebellion and protect the Norman ruling class from resistance by the Anglo-Saxon population.

== Crimes ==
=== Murdrum Law ===
The Murdrum Law was enacted to protect Norman settlers from being targeted by the Anglo-Saxon population following the Norman Conquest. Under this law, if a Norman was murdered, the local community could be held collectively responsible unless they could prove the victim was English or identify the killer. Failure to do so often resulted in a heavy fine being imposed on the entire village. The law reinforced Norman authority through collective punishment and encouraged communities to police themselves, while also discouraging resistance against Norman rule.

=== Forest Laws ===
William I declared large areas of land as royal forests, where hunting and access were strictly regulated under Forest Law. These forests were reserved primarily (if not exclusively) for the king’s use, particularly for hunting deer and other game. Violating these laws, such as hunting without permission or damaging resources, was considered a serious offence and could result in severe punishments, including heavy fines, imprisonment, mutilation, or confiscation of property.

=== Capital Crimes ===
Crimes such as murder, treason, robbery, and rebellion were classified as capital offences under Norman law. Execution became a common form of punishment for serious crimes, with hanging widely used throughout Norman England. Harsh penalties were intended to deter criminal activity and reinforce Norman authority over the population. In some cases, punishments also included mutilation, imprisonment, or the confiscation of land and property, particularly for those accused of resisting royal rule.

== Punishments ==
=== Capital Punishment ===
The use of the death penalty increased significantly during Norman rule. Offenders found guilty of serious crimes such as murder, treason, robbery, and rebellion often faced execution, with hanging becoming one of the most common methods of punishment. These harsh penalties were intended to deter crime, maintain public order, and reinforce Norman authority across England. In some cases, punishments also included mutilation, imprisonment, or the confiscation of land and property, particularly for those accused of resisting royal rule.

=== Corporal Punishment ===
Physical punishments were common in Norman England, with mutilation frequently used as a penalty for certain offences. Those found guilty of violating forest laws, particularly illegal hunting or poaching, could face severe punishments such as the removal of fingers or hands, rendering them unable to use a bow in the future. Other forms of mutilation, including blinding or branding, were also used for serious crimes and acts of rebellion.

=== Fines and Compensation ===
While fines were still imposed for lesser offences, the focus gradually shifted from compensating victims and their families to paying fines directly to the king or his officials. Under the Norman system, many crimes came to be viewed as offences against royal authority rather than solely against individuals.

=== Trial by Combat ===
Trial by Combat allowed an accused person to fight in a duel to prove their innocence. Known as trial by combat, it was often reserved for serious crimes and legal disputes, particularly among nobles and knights. The outcome of the fight was believed to reflect divine judgement, with victory seen as proof that God had favoured the innocent party.

== Sheriffs and Administration ==
The Normans retained many Anglo-Saxon administrative systems, particularly the use of shires and sheriffs. Sheriffs acted as the king’s chief local officials and were responsible for maintaining order, collecting taxes, holding courts, and enforcing royal authority. William I relied heavily on sheriffs to strengthen Norman control over England. Many Anglo-Saxon sheriffs were replaced with Norman nobles who were considered more loyal to the king. The king also used written records, such as the Domesday Book, to monitor land ownership and taxation more effectively. Castles also supported administration by allowing Norman officials and soldiers to maintain authority in regions vulnerable to rebellion. Sheriffs could become extremely powerful and were sometimes accused of corruption or abusing their authority.

== See also ==
- Anglo-Norman England
- Government in Norman and Angevin England
