= Backberend and handhabend =

Class of thief in English Anglo-Saxon law

In Anglo-Saxon law, backberend (also spelled backberende or back-berande) and handhabend (also spelled hand-habend or hand-habende) were terms applied to a thief who was found having the stolen goods in his possession. The terms are respectively derived from "bearing [a thing] upon the back" and "having [a thing] in the hand".

The thief himself was a hontfongenethef, meaning "a thief taken with handhabend"; i.e., captured while holding the stolen item in his hand, later described as "red-handed".

By extension, handhabend and backberend also means the jurisdiction to try a thief caught with the property in question. A thief so caught could be given a trial of a more summary nature. Almost any theft could be a felony, and the death penalty might be applied.

== See also ==
- Halifax Gibbet
