= Fonthill Letter =

Early English letter

The Fonthill Letter is a letter sent by Ordlaf, ealdorman of Wiltshire, to King Edward the Elder (r. 899-924) detailing a property dispute between Ordlaf and Æthelhelm Higa, a rival claimant. While Ordlaf is never explicitly identified as the author, it is apparent due to tenses and position of the speaker throughout the letter. The property in question was five hides of the Fonthill Estate in Ordlaf's county, which Ordlaf had given to the Bishop of Winchester.

It traces the intricate history of the estate's ownership, telling of its former owner Helmstan, Ordlaf's godson, and how the land subsequently passed into Ordlaf's sole ownership after Helmstan's second conviction for stealing a neighbour's oxen.

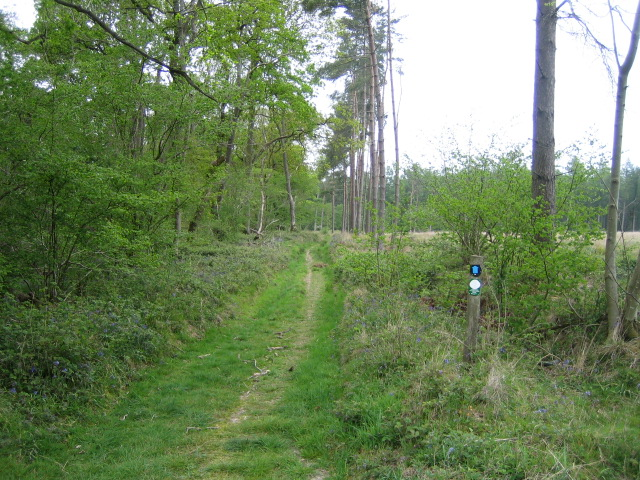
View of Great Ridge wood, part of the Fonthill Estate

The letter was intended to be used as evidence in the ongoing lawsuit between Ordlaf and Higa over ownership of the land. Eventually, the letter served its purpose when Higa withdrew from the suit.

While the letter is not dated, it is suggested that the dispute took place from approximately 897-899/901. This indicates that it started during the closing years of King Alfred's rule and the early years of King Edward the Elder. Suggestions that the manuscript that now survives is a later copy has been criticised by Keynes, on the grounds that the text contains two separate scribal hands.

Despite Whitelock's protestations, the text is complex to understand for most modern readers. In an attempt to improve comprehension, Simon Keynes divides the document in 16 separate sections.

== Figures ==
Ordlaf, a grandson of a West Saxon ealdorman, was probably appointed ealdorman in the latter years of King Alfred's reign. He is regularly relied upon by Helmstan to support him and pardon him from the crimes he commits.

Helmstan's crimes began with his stealing a belt from Aethelred which initially leads to the dispute as Aethelhelm Higa can then claim the land should be forfeited to him. King Alfred intervenes and grants Helmstan the right to maintain ownership. This did, however, damage Helmstan's standing and his consequent conviction for cattle-stealing was therefore magnified. His criminal history was raised during the second stage of the dispute.

Æthelhelm Higa is seen as the rival claimant. Very little is known about him although it is possible he was a descendant of either Aethelwulf and Aethelthryth or heir of Oswulf. In either case, it seems he believed he should inherit the land by right and thus, following Helmstan's conviction, attempted to claim the estate.

== Chronology ==
The letter follows the conventional introduction for addressing the king and outlines the main purpose of the document, mainly the outlining of how the land at Fonthill was passed around.

According to Keynes the story began in the last year or so of King Alfred’s reign, when Helmstan stole a belt belonging to a certain Aethelred. Although not detailed, it shows Helmstan to have larcenous tendencies. This becomes important further into the letter. (He would then be treated in law as a man of ill-repute.) The importance of remaining 'oath-worthy' was therefore lost for Helmstan, and his later conviction for cattle stealing brought up his previous crime and required Ordlaf to become involved.

Following the initial accusations, Helmstan called on his godfather Ordlaf to support him. It was Ordlaf's involvement that brought in Alfred, as an inconsequential piece of land would never largely require his personal attention.

Alfred granted Helmstan entitlement to proceed with establishing his ownership, but this still did not ensure a secure sense. Higa and Helmstan were ordered to reach an agreement. In the arbitration of the dispute, Helmstan once again may be accused of stealing as he never appears on a charter for his ownership of land. He may have stolen the relevant charters from the rightful owner. However, these proved enough to ensure Helmstan maintained right to the land. This links to a treatise from the reign of King Edgar, the importance of proof of possession is greater than the one who attempts to claim the land.

On a specific date, Helmstan began to worry about the requisite oath; this resulted in him again calling on Ordlaf and offering him the land in exchange for assistance – effectively a bribe – even though Ordlaf attempts to describe it as otherwise in the letter. After again succeeding in holding on to the land, the deed was given to Ordlaf (showing how Anglo-Saxon transfer of land would be related to the relevant title-deed).

Helmstan was later caught stealing cattle, leading them from Fonthill (now Ordlafs estate) to his own neighbouring land. He was caught, however, after being scratched by a bramble attempting to run away from his pursuer.

Due to his previous convictions and the substantial evidence against him, Helmstan could no longer avoid conviction and Ordlaf could no longer assist him. All his goods were taken and land forfeited. This section of the letter raises the question about Helmstan's status; it is possible that he held a large area of land nearby. If this is so he would have had a more prominent presence in the locality and would have been much more than a petty thief.

This meant that Ordlaf resumed possession of the five hides. A general principle of Anglo-Saxon law therefore emerges; that any bookland would pass to the king on forfeiture, while any land held on loan would revert to its rightful owner (although this may not have been universal and other claimants may emerge, thus a motivation for this letter perhaps).

Helmstan never regained Fonthill but, after Alfred's death and swearing an oath at his grave, Edward reversed his outlawry and granted him some property.

Following this, Ordlaf promptly returns to authority over Fonthill but trades it with the bishop for five hides in Lydiard. Keynes's section 15 thus sees Ordlaf appeal to the king to maintain the status quo as his new land relies on the continuance of the bishop holding Fonthill (which is still noted as belonging to the bishop of Winchester in 1066 and 1086).

An endorsement on the letter after it had been folded is then added, describing Higa's withdrawal from his suit against the bishop, but the exact nature of this is unknown.

This chronology owes much to the work of Simon Keynes and his analysis of the Fonthill Letter.

== Importance ==
The letter would not have been significant at the time and would not have become a topic within the headlines of the Anglo-Saxon chronicle. However, historians now place great emphasis on the lessons it teaches about the working of Anglo-Saxon law and legal practices. It first received attention from Kentish antiquary William Somner, and the letter's text first appeared in print in the 1840 publication of John Mitchell Kemble's Codex Diplomaticus. It has now been approached by many historians with prominent examples being Simon Keynes and Dorothy Whitelock.

The document shows the earliest example of written correspondence sent from an Anglo-Saxon layman to the king. It also shows the importance of kindred ties within Anglo-Saxon society as highlighted by the consistent support offered by Ordlaf for his godson Helmstan. The letter raises concerns of corruption and abuse of power as seen through Helmstan's ability to twist proceedings through connections with powerful figures such as Ordlaf.
