= Contenement =

Appurtenance

In old English law, contenement is that which is held together with another thing; that which is connected with a tenement, or thing held, such as a certain quantity of land adjacent to a dwelling, and necessary to the reputable enjoyment of the dwelling. This is also known as "appurtenance".

According to some legal authors, the term should signify the countenance, credit, or reputation a person has, with and by reason of his freehold. And in such sense it is used in the statute 1 Edw. III, etc., where it stands as synonymous with "countenance".
