= Amercement =

Financial penalty in medieval English law

An amercement is a financial penalty in English law, common during the Middle Ages, imposed either by the court or by peers.

While it is often synonymous with a fine, it differs in that a fine is a fixed sum prescribed by statute and was often voluntary, while an amercement is arbitrary. Amercements were commonly used as a punishment for minor offences (such as trespassing in the king's forest), as an alternative to imprisonment.

== Etymology ==
The noun "amercement" derives from the verb to amerce: a king would amerce his subject, who had broken a law. The term is of Anglo-Norman origin (Law French, from French, from Latin), and literally means "being at the mercy of": a-merce-ment (the English word mercy is cognate).

== History ==
=== Early Norman rule ===
A system of amercements was in place as early as the Norman Conquest of 1066, but was still regarded as an innovation when Henry I acceded to the throne in 1100. As the number of entities having legal jurisdiction over a given location increased, the sums demanded from a wrongdoer who wished to buy himself back under protection of the law had become increasingly burdensome. He had to satisfy claims of the victim's family, of the victim's lord, of the lord within whose territory the crime had been committed, perhaps of the church whose sanctuary had been invaded, of other lords who could show an interest of any sort, and finally of the king as lord paramount. It became practically impossible to buy back the peace once it had been broken. The Crown, however, stepped in, and offered protection on certain conditions: the culprit surrendered himself and all that he had to the king, placing himself “in misericordiam regis”, and delivering a tangible pledge (vadium) as evidence and security of the surrender. Strictly speaking, the man's life and limbs and all that he had were at the king's mercy. The Crown, however, found that excessive greed could be self-defeating, and generally contented itself with moderate forfeits. Rules of procedure were formulated: the amounts taken were regulated partly by the wealth of the offender, and partly by the gravity of the offence. Further, it became a recognized rule that the amount should be assessed by what was practically a jury of the culprit's neighbours; and attempts were also made to fix a maximum.

Thus a sort of tariff grew up, which the Crown usually respected in practice, without abandoning the right to demand more. Such payments were known as “amercements.” For petty offences, men were constantly placed “in mercy”: for failure to attend meetings of a hundred or county; for false or mistaken verdicts; for infringements of forest rights. The Charter of Henry I (chapter 8) had promised a remedy, drastic indeed but of a reactionary and impossible nature. His promise, to abolish altogether the system of amercements (then of recent introduction) and to revert to the earlier Anglo–Saxon system of bots and wites, was made only to be broken. No one could expect to pass through life (perhaps hardly through a single year) without being subjected to amercements.

=== Magna Carta ===
Three chapters of Magna Carta are occupied with remedies for this ill. Chapter 20 seeks to protect the ordinary layman; chapter 21, the barons; and chapter 22, the clergy. Three subdivisions—the freeman, the villein, and the merchant—are treated here.

Amercements are much mentioned in Magna Carta, particularly article 20:

A free man shall not be amerced for a trivial offence except in accordance with the degree of the offence, and for a grave offence he shall be amerced in accordance with its gravity, yet saving his way of living; and a merchant in the same way, saving his stock-in-trade; and a villein shall be amerced in the same way, saving his means of livelihood--if they have fallen into our mercy: and none of the aforesaid amercements shall be imposed except by the oath of good men of the neighbourhood.

==== Amercement of freemen ====
The great object of the reforms here promised was to eliminate the arbitrary element; the Crown must conform to its own customary rules. With this object, safeguards were devised for freemen. (a) For a slight offence, only a petty sum could be taken. This was nothing new: the records of John’s reign show that, both before and after 1215, very small amounts were often taken: threepence was a common sum. (b) For grave offences, a larger sum might be assessed, but not out of proportion to the offence. (c) In no case could the offender be pushed absolutely to the wall: his means of livelihood must be saved to him. Even if all other effects had to be sold off to pay the amount assessed, he was to retain his “contenement,” a word to be afterwards discussed. (d) Another clause provided machinery for giving effect to these rules. The amount must be fixed, not arbitrarily by the Crown, but by impartial assessors, “by the oath of honest men of the neighbourhood.” In the reissue of 1216 “honest men” became “honest and lawworthy (legalium) men,” a purely verbal change.

There were apparently two steps in the fixing of amercements. (a) In the case of a commoner, the penalty under normal circumstances would be assessed provisionally by the king's justices on circuit, with the assistance of the sheriff. It was their duty to see that the amount was proportionate to the gravity of the offence. (b) Thereafter, the sheriff or his serjeants, in full county court, with the assistance of twelve neighbours, taxed the amercements, reducing them in accordance with their knowledge of the wrong–doer's ability to pay.

The Pipe Rolls afford illustrations of the practice. In the fourteenth year of Henry II a certain priest (who, in this respect, stood on the same footing as a layman) had been placed in misericordiam of 100 marks by William fitz John, one of the king's justices, but that sum was afterwards reduced to 40 marks per sacramentum vicinorum suorum. It seems a safe inference that, on the priest pleading poverty, the question of his ability to pay was referred to local recognitors with the result stated. This priest was subsequently pardoned altogether “because of his poverty.”

Magna Carta in this chapter, treating of the amercements of freeholders, merchants and villeins, makes no reference to the part played by the king's justices, but only to the functions of the jury of neighbours. All this is in marked contrast with the provisions of chapter 21, regulating the treatment to be accorded to earls and barons who made default.

==== Amercement of villeins ====
The early history of villeins as a class is enveloped in the mists that still surround the rise of the English manor. Notwithstanding the efforts of Frederic Seebohm to find the origin of villeinage in the status of the serfs who worked for Roman masters upon British farms long before the Teutonic immigrations began, an older theory still holds the field, namely, that the abject villeins of Norman days were descendants of free–born ceorls of Anglo–Saxon stock. On this theory, most of England was once cultivated by Anglo–Saxon peasant proprietors grouped in little societies, each of which formed an isolated village. These villagers were slowly sinking from their originally free estate during several centuries prior to 1066: but the process of their degradation was completed rapidly and roughly by the Norman conquerors. The once free peasantry were crushed down into the dependent villeins of the eleventh and twelfth centuries.

Whichever theory may be the correct one, the position, economic, legal, and political, of villeins in the thirteenth century has been ascertained with certainty. Economically they were part of the equipment of the manor of their lord, whose fields they had to cultivate as a condition of being left in possession of acres, in a sense, their own. The services exacted, at first vague and undefined, were gradually specified and limited. They varied from century to century, from district to district, and even from manor to manor; but at best the life of the villein was, as a contemporary writer has described it, burdensome and wretched (graviter et miserabiliter). After his obligations were discharged, little time was left him for the ploughing and reaping of his own holding. The normal villein possessed his virgate or half virgate (thirty or fifteen scattered acres) under a tenure known as villenagium, sharply distinguished from the freeholder's tenures. He was a dependent dweller on a manor which he dared not quit without his master's leave.

It is true that he had rights of a proprietary nature in the acres he claimed as his own; yet these were determined, not by the common law of England, but by “the custom of the manor,” or virtually at the will of the lord. These rights, such as they were, could not be pleaded elsewhere than before the court customary of that manor over which the lord's steward presided with powers wide and undefined. Politically his position was peculiar: allowed none of the privileges, he was yet expected to perform some of the duties, of the freeman. He attended the shire and hundred courts, and acted on juries, thus suffering still further encroachments on the scanty portion of time he might call his own, but preserving for a brighter day a vague tradition of his earlier liberty.

This chapter extends some measure of protection to villeins. Two questions, however, may be asked:—What measure? and from what motive? One point is clear: the villeins were protected from the abuse of only such amercements as John himself might inflict, not from the amercements of their manorial lords; for the words used are si inciderint in misericordiam nostram. A villein in the king's mercy shall enjoy the same consideration as the freeholder or merchant in similar plight—his means of livelihood being saved to him. The word now used is neither “contenement” nor merchandise, but waynagium, the meaning of which has been the subject of discussion. Coke defined it as “the contenement of a villein; or the furniture of his cart or wain,” and Coke has been widely followed. The word, however, has apparently no connexion with wains or wagons, but is merely a Latinized form of the French word gagnage, of which Godefroy gives five meanings: (a) gain; (b) tillage; (c) crop; (d) land under the plough; (e) grain. Professor Tait is inclined to read the word, in its present context, as equivalent either to “crops” or to “lands under cultivation,” and to translate the clause “saving his tillage.” What was the motive of these restrictions? It is usually supposed to have been clemency, the humane desire not to reduce a poor wretch to absolute beggary. It is possible, however, to imagine a different motive; the villein was the property of his lord, and John must respect the vested interests of others. That the King might do what he pleased with his own property, his demesne villeins, seems clear from a passage usually neglected by commentators, namely, chapter 16 of the reissue of 1217. Four important words were there introduced—villanus alterius quam noster: the king was not to inflict crushing amercements on villeins “other than his own,” thus leaving villeins on royal manors unreservedly in his power.

==== Amercement of merchants ====
The trader is in the same position as the liber homo, except that it is his “merchandise,” not his “contenement,” that is protected. The word is capable of two somewhat different shades of meaning. Narrowly interpreted, it may refer to his wares, the stock–in–trade without which the pursuit of his calling would be impossible. More broadly viewed, it might mean his business itself, his position as a merchant. The difference is of little practical import: in either view the Charter saves to him his means of earning a living.

Some boroughs, indeed, had anticipated Magna Carta by obtaining in their own charters a definition of the maximum amercement exigible, or in some cases of the amercing body. Thus, John's Charter to Dunwich of 29 June 1200 provides that the burgesses shall only be amerced by six men from within the borough, and six men from without. The capital had special privileges: in his Charter to London, Henry I promised that no citizen in misericordia pecuniae should pay a higher sum than 100 shillings (the amount of his wer). This was confirmed in the Charter of Henry II, who declared “that none shall be adjudged for amercements of money, but according to the law of the city, which they had in the time of King Henry, my grandfather.” John's Charter to London of 17 June 1199, also referred to this; and the general confirmation of customs, contained in chapter 13 of Magna Carta, would further strengthen it. In all probability, the earlier grant covered trivial offences only (such as placed the offender in the king's hands de misericordia pecuniae). The present chapter is wider in its scope, applying to grave offences also, and embracing merchants everywhere, not merely the burgesses of chartered towns.

=== Later Plantagenet rule ===
Later in the thirteenth century, these terms were sharply contrasted. “Amercement” was applied to sums imposed in punishment of misdeeds; the law–breaker had no option of refusing, and no voice in fixing the amount. “Fine,” on the contrary, was used for voluntary offerings made to the king to obtain some favour or to escape punishment. Here the initiative rested with the individual, who suggested the amount to be paid, and was, indeed, under no legal obligation to make any offer at all. This distinction between fines and amercements, absolute in theory, could readily be obliterated in practice. The spirit of the restriction placed by this chapter and by the common law upon the King's prerogative of inflicting amercements could often be evaded. The Crown might imprison its victims for an indefinite period, and then graciously allow them to offer large payments to escape death by fever or starvation in a noisome jail: enormous fines might thus be taken, while royal officials were forbidden to inflict arbitrary amercements.

With the gradual elimination of the voluntary element the word “fine” came to bear its modern meaning, while “amercement” dropped out of ordinary use.

== Modern usage ==
=== In the United States ===
Referred to in Frantz v. U.S. Powerlifting Federation 836 F.2d 1063 (7th Cir. 1987). In a discussion about the imposition of FRCP Rule 11 sanctions on a plaintiff's attorney, the decision says, "The complaint in this case was frivolous, which calls at a minimum for censure of Victor D. Quilici, the plaintiffs' lawyer. Whether it calls for amercement - and, if so, whether Cotter or the Treasury is the appropriate beneficiary - is something the district court should consider as an initial matter."

A cause of action in amercement will exist against a sheriff who refused to seize property under a writ of execution. Vitale v. Hotel California, Inc., 446 A.2d 880 (N.J. Super. Ct. Law, 1982). See also http://codes.ohio.gov/orc/2101.09v1 and http://codes.ohio.gov/orc/2101.10v1 .

Since 2006, US banks have been amerced large amounts under prosecution of the International Emergency Economic Powers Act, or the Trading with the Enemy Act. The civil nature of the asset forfeiture laws allows the banks not to be declared criminally guilty. The asset forfeiture wiki lists a number of cases of recent note.

=== In Canada ===
By January 2014, eight provinces had "civil forfeiture acts" on the law books. All dated from the 21st century.

- 2001 - Alberta - Victims Restitution and Compensation Payment Act
- 2001 - Ontario - Civil Remedies Act
- 2004 - Manitoba - The Criminal Property Forfeiture Act
- 2005 - British Columbia - Civil Forfeiture Act
- 2007 - Quebec - An Act respecting the forfeiture, administration and appropriation of proceeds and instruments of unlawful activity c C-52.2
- 2007 - Nova Scotia - Civil Forfeiture Act
- 2009 - Saskatchewan - The Seizure of Criminal Property Act, 2009
- 2010 - New Brunswick - Civil Forfeiture Act SNB 2010, c C-4.5

Yukoners rejected "Bill 82" in 2010. Prince Edward Island and Newfoundland and Labrador appear to be the remaining holdout provinces.

==== Alberta ====
In force since November 2001, Alberta's régime now provides a helpful six-step flowchart diagram, and remarks that "... the Civil Forfeiture process operates regardless of whether charges are laid, or convictions are obtained. The Civil Forfeiture Office only has to prove, based on a balance of probabilities, that:

- the property was acquired by illegal means, or
- the property was used to carry out an illegal activity that was likely to cause bodily harm or illegal gain
- Property includes all types of assets, including real estate, cars and cash."

==== Ontario ====
In 2001, Ontario passed the Remedies for Organized Crime and Other Unlawful Activities Act, 2001 (since changed to the Civil Remedies Act, 2001). This was a novelty in the field of provincial legislation. In 2007, Michael Bryant, then Attorney-General for Ontario, was "proud that Ontario continues to be a nationally and internationally recognized leader in the field of civil forfeiture." The Ontario Civil Remedies for Illicit Activities (CRIA) office was, according to Bryant, "considered an international authority on civil forfeiture," as the Civil Remedies Act had been the first of its kind in Canada. (Note: Ontario's act was the first passed but Alberta's was the first in force.)

In Ontario, the legislation has been used to amerce large quantities of banknotes. A law officer detained a citizen for driving too slowly. The officer searched the vehicle and found $75,000 in the trunk. The $75,000 was amerced because the officer disbelieved the explanation of the citizen.

==== British Columbia ====
When "Bill 5", which was later to become the Civil Forfeiture Act, was introduced by British Columbia Solicitor-General Rich Coleman, he made liberal use of the "organised crime" fear, uncertainty and doubt tactic. He also mentioned that Ontario, Manitoba and Alberta had also recently introduced similar legislation. This law later was expanded to create the Civil Forfeiture Office, whereby property can be amerced with no court process.

==== Manitoba ====
Since at least 2010, Manitoba has used the popular distaste for pederasty to amerce land and abodes. A woman was found to state her support for the amercement of the home a youth soccer coach who had been accused of a crime but not convicted because "The courts are notoriously lenient with these individuals and I think the Crown is saying enough is enough — if this is another means that we can use to make it more risky for these individuals let's do it."

==== Saskatchewan ====
In Saskatchewan, a man had his truck amerced in 2010 when, for want of $60 worth of gas, he trafficked two tablets of Oxycontin to an undercover police officer. The Crown maintained that his truck was an instrument of crime. The trial judge ruled in favour of the defendant, but was overruled on appeal to by the Crown.

==== Nova Scotia ====
Since 2007, Nova Scotia has made "sure that crime doesn't pay. The province has set up a civil forfeiture unit, which receives cases referred from law enforcement agencies where there is evidence of wrongdoing but criminal charges are not laid, such as bootlegging or selling stolen property."

==== Canadian jurisprudence ====
In 2009, the Supreme Court of Canada held that the Civil Remedies Act 2001 of Ontario was constitutionally sound with respect to a question about federal-provincial jurisdiction in Chatterjee v. Ontario (Attorney-General). A brief was written by Ross.

The LLM thesis of JA Krane, which studied amercements in detail, concluded that the Charter of Rights was deficient because it fails to enshrine property rights. Krane condenses this work into a 29-page prospectus entitled "Property, Proportionality and the Instruments of Crime".

In a 2013 review paper, Gallant and King expressed their concern over amercements in Canada and Ireland. An earlier article by Gallant was cited in the SCC Chatterjee judgment.

The Court of Alberta Queen's Bench and the British Columbia Supreme Court have excluded evidence obtained illegally,

== See also ==
- Fixed penalty notice - modern UK practice
- Asset freezing
- Contenement
- Eminent domain
- Equitable sharing
- Forfeiture (law)
- Forfeiture Endangers American Rights – U.S. anti-forfeiture activist organization
- Operation Protect Our Children
- Sanctions (law)
- Sheriffs in the United States
- United States Marshals Service
