= Custumal =

Medieval-English document

A custumal is a medieval-English document that stipulates the economic, political, and social customs of a manor or town. It is common for it to include an inventory of customs, regular agricultural, trading and financial activities as well as local laws. It could be written for one manor or a whole county.

== Manorial custumals ==
The National Archives define custumal as "an early type of survey which consists of a list of the manor's tenants with the customs under which each held his house and lands." Custumals were compiled in Latin, Anglo-French or Law French and sometimes mixed fragments in different languages. They were commonly preceded with a standard formula in French: Ces sount les usages, et les custumes le ques ... (These are the usages and customs of ...).

Custumals existed in two distinct forms:

- An inventory of the customs of the manor itself which summarized its regular agricultural, trading and financial activities. This was the most common form, usually complete with a local code of laws, a summary of oral sworn tradition, in-house manorial rolls and written legal arrangements between the landlord and his tenants.
- A survey, or an inventory of rents and services ("customs") owed by each tenant of the manor; this form was relatively uncommon.

Territories governed by a custumal ranged from a single manor (Custumal of the Manor of Cockerham, 1326–1327) to an assortment of manors under common control (Custumal of Battle Abbey, reign of Edward I) to a whole county. The county-wide Custumal of Kent, written in Anglo-French, codified the unique system of gavelkind in Kent that existed for centuries before its enactment in 1293. The Custumal of Kent has been regularly copied by scribes, who introduced errors and inserted glosses, and printed by Richard Tottel in 1536 and by William Lambarde in 1576. These printed codes are all distinctly different, the three handwritten and two printed copies analyzed by Hull have only nine substantially matching paragraphs (out of thirty-five). Lesser custumals were far more stable: the Custumal of the Manor of Cockerham was properly revised in 1463.

Custumals of large ecclesiastical estates introduced their own systems of grading the tenants. The Custumal of Battle Abbey used four grades:

- freeholders (liberi tenentes), free tenants holding land in free socage;
- villeins (villani, custumarii), customary tenants not adscript to the soil;
- cottars or cottagers (cottarii), subtenants usually holding fixed parcels of four acres (a cotland); and
- subcottars: small cottars (coterelli), holders of one or two acres, and landless cottars (cotteria).

Custumals provide historians an insight into all significant aspects of everyday life in a manorial estate. Custumals of the Manor of Cockerham, written in Latin in 1326–1327, regulated usage of all resources of the country: peat fuel, salt, sheep, goats, horses, cattle and shoreline mussels. It imposed practical safeguards for preservation of the property: the tenants were obliged to "maintain the dikes of the mill pond so that the pond does not burst for the lack of them". It also set the rules of personal conduct: "no tenant shall call any of his neighbours a thief or a robber under a penalty of 40d. And no tenant shall call any of his neighbours a whore, for a penalty of 12d." Ultimately, according to Steven Justice, "no form of writing served lordly interests and ideology more surely and directly than the manorial custumal."

== Borough custumals ==
Since public business in the Middle Ages was judicial in character, the custumal and the court roll were the principal registers of a medieval borough’s administration. Custumals, or collections of customary law, for the English boroughs began to be compiled as early as the late twelfth century, the earliest of which have survived for the boroughs of Ipswich and Exeter. Custumals were compiled for a practical purpose: to guide, and even educate, successive generations of civic officials tasked with keeping law and order within their boroughs. Even though town clerks and scribes inherited these registers as part of their duties to preserve local custom, they were also obligated to modify and add to them to respond to changing interests and the needs of their communities. As such, it is not out of the ordinary to have custumals survive only in copies or recensions of the original.

The study of borough customs primarily flourished in the early twentieth century, when both historians and amateur antiquarians began to take a keen interest in the constitutional origins of the English law. Indeed, the most comprehensive work on borough law is Mary Bateson's Borough Customs, published for the Selden Society in two volumes for the years 1904 and 1906.

Although the clauses and ordinances found in borough custumals seem to be primarily concerned with the rights of burgesses (the men who had entered the town's freedom) and regulation of economic practices, they also reveal larger social concerns regarding the governance of the borough. A good example of these political, social, and economic concerns, and how they could change over time, can be easily seen in the document outlining the customs of the borough of Maldon, in Essex.
