= Treaty of Wedmore =

9th century accord between Alfred the Great and Guthrum the Old

The Treaty of Wedmore (Note: Also known as the Treaty of Chippenham or the Peace of Wedmore) is a 9th century agreement between King Alfred the Great of Wessex and the Viking king Guthrum the Old. The only contemporary reference to the treaty is that of a Welsh monk, Asser, in his biography of Alfred, known as Vita Ælfredi regis Angul Saxonum, or "The Life of King Alfred", in which Asser describes how after Guthrum's defeat at the Battle of Ethandun, followed by his surrender some days later, he agreed to a peace treaty with Alfred. The treaty was conditional on Guthrum's being baptised to endorse the agreement, as well as to allow him to rule more legitimately over his Christian vassals but to remain pagan to his pagan vassals. Also, Guthrum and his army were to leave Wessex.

== Sources and historical context ==
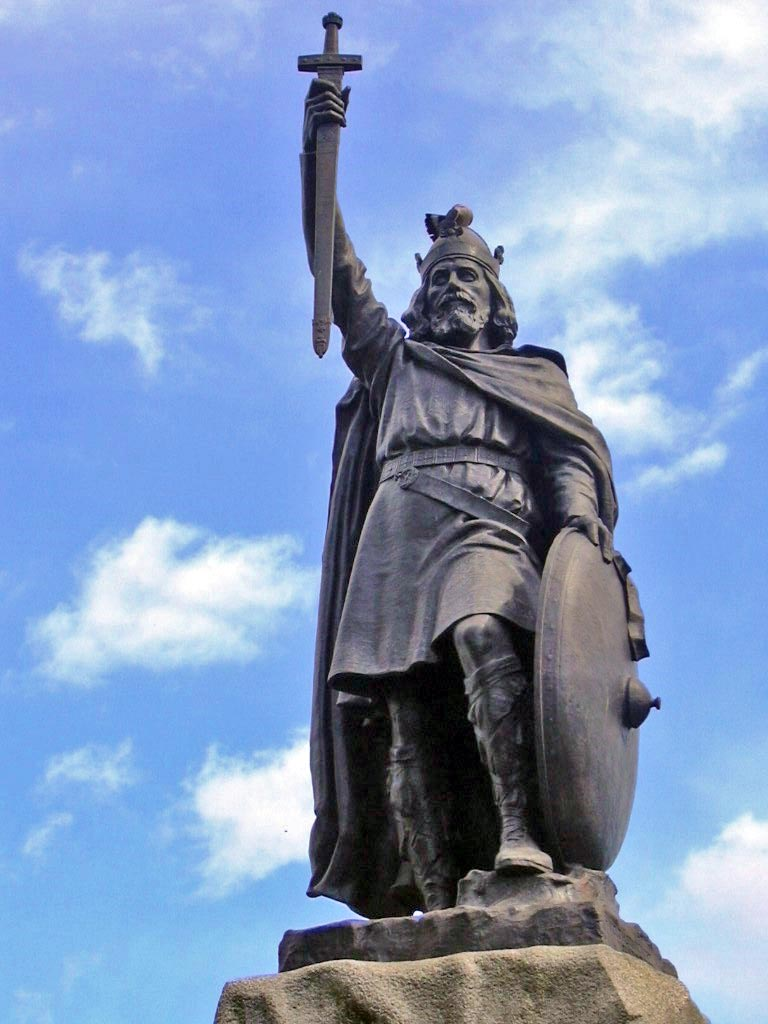
Statue of Alfred the Great at Winchester

According to Asser, in his biography of King Alfred, known as Vita Ælfredi regis Angul Saxonum, or "The Life of King Alfred", in 878 Alfred defeated the Viking Great Army at the Battle of Ethandun. Guthrum, the Viking leader, retreated with the remnants of his army to their "stronghold", where Alfred besieged him.

After fourteen days, the Vikings, according to Asser:

"..thoroughly terrified by hunger, cold and fear and in the end despair, sought peace on this condition: the king should take as many hostages as he wanted from them and give none to them.."

— Asser 1983, pp. 84–85

Alfred accepted Guthrum's surrender and the Vikings gave Alfred peace hostages:

[They] "swore in addition that they would leave his kingdom immediately, and Guthrum, their king, promised to accept Christianity and to receive baptism at King Alfred's hand; all of which he and his men fulfilled as they had promised..."

— Asser 1983, pp. 84–85

Three weeks later Guthrum and thirty of his most important men went to Alfred at Aller, near Athelney. There Guthrum was baptised, with Alfred accepting him as his adoptive son. The unbinding of the chrisom, part of a baptismal ritual, took place eight days later at the royal estate and church at Wedmore near Cheddar.

Guthrum adopted the baptismal name of Athelstan. The following twelve days Guthrum and his chiefs stayed with Alfred where they were honoured with gifts and feasting. During the summer of 878, Guthrum's army remained in Chippenham. Then, as agreed Guthrum and his army moved out of Wessex, and travelled the relatively short distance (Note: About 20 miles (32 km)) to Cirencester (in the Kingdom of Mercia) and then eventually on to East Anglia.

== Misinterpretation and confusion ==
The Anglo-Saxon Chronicle for 878 has a similar description to Asser. It details Alfred's movements before, during and after the Battle of Ethandun. It describes Guthrum's surrender, his baptism at Wedmore, and the twelve days of celebration. The only reference to an accord at Wedmore is that from Asser's "Life of King Alfred". If there was a formal treaty, contemporary with the events at Wedmore in 878, no such document still exists. A truce was made and, at a later date, (Note: The actual date is not known. The latest possible date is agreed as 890 as this is the year Guthrum died; however, the earliest date varies according to historians. For example, Giles Morgan suggests 879 and David Horspool 886. The treaty of Alfred and Guthrum ascribes Viking-held London to Alfred, so some historians have suggested that the treaty would not have been finalised until Alfred reoccupied the city in 886. The Anglo Saxon Chronicle for 885 says that "... the army from East-Anglia broke their peace with Alfred," which might indicate that the treaty had been signed earlier.) a formal treaty was agreed. This one was known as the Treaty of Alfred and Guthrum and it defines the boundaries between Alfred and Guthrum's territories, as well as agreements on peaceful trade and the weregild value of its people. This document still survives (Note: There is an Old English version at Corpus Christi College, Cambridge MS 383, and in a legal collection compiled and translated into Latin during the reign of Henry I, known as the Quadripartitus.) and is part of the Laws of Alfred. The treaty is seen as a precursor to the formation of Danelaw. (Note: The "Treaty of Alfred and Guthrum" was probably just a way to manage the border between the two kings, rather than have any long term objectives, such as the foundation of Danelaw. See Lesley Abrams in Edward the Elder: 899-924 for a discussion on the subject.)

The Treaty of Wedmore and the Treaty of Alfred and Guthrum have often been confused with each other. It is possible that the Treaty of Wedmore in 878, by which Guthrum had to accept baptism and leave Wessex, was a verbal agreement. The formal, written Treaty of Alfred and Guthrum, dividing up the kingdoms, followed some years later.

== Bibliography ==
- Abrams, Lesley (2001). "Edward the Elder's Danelaw". In Higham, N. J.; Hill, D. H. (eds.). Edward the Elder 899–924. Abingdon, UK: Routledge. ISBN 0-415-21497-1.
- Asser (1983). "Life of King Alfred". In Keynes, Simon; Lapidge, Michael (eds.). Alfred the Great: Asser's Life of King Alfred & Other Contemporary Sources. Penguin Classics. ISBN 978-0-14-044409-4.
- Attenborough, F.L. Tr, ed. (1922). "Treaties with the Danes". The laws of the earliest English kings. Cambridge: Cambridge University Press. OCLC 460226655.
- Ayto, John; Crofton, Ian (2005). Brewer's Britain and Ireland. London: Weidenfeld & Nichoson. ISBN 0-304-35385-X.
- Gransden, Antonia (1996). Historical Writing in England: c. 500 to c. 1307. London: Routledge. ISBN 0-415-15124-4.
- Horspool, David (2006). Why Alfred Burned the Cakes. London: Profile Books. ISBN 1-8619-7786-7.
- Keynes, Simon (1999). "The Cult of King Alfred the Great". Anglo-Saxon England. 28. Cambridge University Press: 225–356. doi:10.1017/S0263675100002337. ISSN 0263-6751. JSTOR 44512350.
- Morgan, Giles (2018). Short History of the Anglo Saxons. Somerton, Somerset: Oldcastle Books. ISBN 978-0-85730-166-6.
- Smyth, Alfred P. (1995). King Alfred the Great. Oxford: Oxford University Press. ISBN 0-19-822989-5.
- Stenton, F. M. (1971). Anglo-Saxon England 3rd edition. Oxford: OUP. p. 257. ISBN 978-0-19-280139-5.
- Whitelock, Dorothy, ed. (1996). The treaty between Alfred and Guthrum. English Historical Documents. Vol. 1 (2 ed.). Oxford: Routledge. ISBN 0-203-43950-3.
- Wood, Michael (2005). In Search of the Dark Ages. London: BBC. ISBN 978-0-563-52276-8.
