= Leges Henrici Primi =

12th-century Latin legal treatise

- Laws of Henry I Leges Henrici
- Author(s): unknown
- Dedicated to: King Henry I of England
- Language: medieval Latin
- Date: c. 1115
- Manuscript(s): 6 extant manuscripts plus 3 known lost manuscripts
- Rylands lat.155 c. 1201 (Rs)
- Red Book of the Exchequer c. 1225 (Sc)
- Hargrave MS 313 c. 1255 (Hg)
- Cotton MS Claudius D.II c. 1310 (K)
- Corpus Christi College 70 c. 1320 (Co)
- Oriel College 46 c. 1330 (Or)
- Principal manuscript(s): K, Rs
- First printed edition: 1644
- Genre: Legal text
- Subject: English laws and legal procedures

The Leges Henrici Primi or Laws of Henry I is a legal treatise, written in about 1115, that records the legal customs of medieval England in the reign of King Henry I of England. Although it is not an official document, it was written by someone apparently associated with the royal administration. It lists and explains the laws and includes explanations of how to conduct legal proceedings. Although its title implies that these laws were issued by King Henry, it lists laws issued by earlier monarchs that were still in force in Henry's reign; the only law of Henry that is included is the coronation charter he issued at the start of his reign. It covers a diverse range of subjects, including ecclesiastical cases, treason, murder, theft, feuds, assessment of danegeld, and the amounts of judicial fines.

The work survives in six manuscripts that range in date from about 1200 to around 1330, belonging to two different manuscript traditions. Besides the six surviving manuscripts, three others were known to scholars in the 17th and 18th centuries, but have not survived to the present day. Two other copies may also have existed. The complete work was first printed in 1644, but an earlier partial edition appeared in 1628. The Leges is the first legal treatise in English history and has been credited with having a greater effect on the views of English law before the reign of King Henry II than any other work of its kind.

== Background and similar works ==
The Leges Henrici Primi or Laws of Henry I is not merely a compilation of laws but an integrated legal treatise, the first such in the history of England, written in the Latin language about 1115. It records the legal customs of medieval England. It was part of a small group of similar writings devoted to legal procedures that were written for royal administrators. Besides the Leges, other works of this type produced at this time were the Quadripartitus, parts of the Leges Edwardi Regis, the Instituta Cnuti, and the Consiliatio Cnuti. It is possible the Leges Willhelmi was also written during this time period. It is the longest of the legal tracts from its time and made some effort to be comprehensive.

== Sources ==
The provisions set forth in the Leges can be traced to laws of Cnut along with various Anglo-Saxon codes. Some of the Anglo-Saxon codes used may have been subsequently lost. Also, certain legal terms used in the Leges, whether in their original English language or rendered into Latin, cannot be found in any extant legal code and may be another example of preserving now-lost legal codes or provisions. It also draws upon non-English sources, including Isidore of Seville and Ivo of Chartres, as well as legal codes such as Frankish and canon law. Other sources include the Vulgate edition of the Bible and Roman law codes, although the debt to those sources is small.

== Authorship and title ==
The Leges was written between 1114 and 1118 by an unknown Norman, who is very likely to be the author of another legal work, the Quadripartitus, although some historians, including H. G. Richardson and G. O. Sayles, argue that the two works were by different authors. The Leges was probably part of a project including the Quadripartitus, the two works being part of a planned work in four volumes to cover not only the laws of the writer's own time but previous laws of the Anglo-Saxon monarchs, as well as how to handle legal cases. As part of both works, the author has included the Charter of Liberties, which was King Henry's coronation charter promising not to follow the administrative and legal policies of his predecessor, King William II. About a third of the material in the Leges is also in the Quadripartitus. There is evidence that the author of the two works had been a member of the household of Gerard, who had been chancellor under Kings William I and William II before becoming Archbishop of York under Henry I. The work was likely composed at Winchester.

Usually, the work has been known as the Leges Henrici Primi, or Laws of Henry the First. It gained that name from the inscription "De libertate ecclesie et totius Anglie obseruanda leges Henrici primi" which occurs on five of the six extant manuscripts. The sixth manuscript adds "filii conquestoris" at the end of the inscription. (Note: It is the Sc manuscript that appends the "filii conquestoris".) The historian Felix Libermann called the work Leges Henrici, but the fuller title of Leges Henrici Primi is generally used to help differentiate which Henry is being referred to.

== Contents ==
The work is not a law code issued by King Henry but a compilation of already extant legislation that was still current during his reign. It is not a comprehensive listing of all laws in force during the early 11th century. It begins with Henry's Charter of Liberties, which he issued after his coronation, and this is the only actual legal document reproduced in the Leges. Some discussions of juridical matters follow, then a long treatment of ecclesiastical issues. The rest of the treatise is concerned with non-ecclesiastical subjects, including cases of injury, theft, murder, and feuds. Procedural topics include how court summonses should be formed, what notices need to be made before judicial procedures, how adjournments should be handled, and other such concerns. There is no strong organizational framework to the entirety of the Leges, which leads the author to repeat subjects as well as treat some subjects less than adequately.

The law code recognised the difference between the laws of the Danelaw, the old Kingdom of Mercia, and the lands of the Kingdom of Wessex. It also set out a list of legal proceedings that could only be tried before the king or his officials, the cases of which were known as "royal pleas" or "pleas of the crown"; they included serious crimes such as treason, murder, rape, robbery, arson, and some types of theft. Treasure trove and salvage from wrecks were also matters of interest to the crown. Other royal cases involved counterfeiters or false judgement, or violent acts against the king himself or his household and servants. The king also reserved the right to hear appeals from other courts conducted by local authorities or by his nobles. The tract also set out who should attend the shire court, ruling that the local bishop and earl, as well as the sheriff and local barons, among others, should attend.

The work assumes that the royal legal system would still address some issues that later would have been dealt with by ecclesiastical courts. Clergy are not only to take part in the shire court, but could be summoned to answer charges in the court. It also sets out the established courts and their jurisdiction. It takes for granted that the Anglo-Saxon laws of England are still in effect. It also addresses the administration of forest law under Henry I. Another new concern in the Leges is law covering the roadways and highways.

Another area covered by the work is royal finance, with the Leges setting out the rate of Danegeld, at a rate of one shilling per hide. It also covers judicial fines, setting forth a fine of 46 marks as the penalty for committing murder. The author of the work criticised the royal justices, calling them greedy. It sets out elaborate procedures for the conduct of murder cases, or murdum.

The Leges also devoted some effort to the theory of the law and attempted to make generalisations about legal procedures and practices. It also contains a number of dicta which became cliches, such as "who unknowingly offends will knowingly amend" and "witness is not needed as to what did not occur, but as to what an accused claims did occur".

== Manuscripts ==
The work comes down to the present day in two manuscript traditions, neither one of which contains many manuscripts. There are six surviving manuscripts between the two traditions – that of the manuscript Sc and its copies, and the "London group". The Sc group is composed of the Sc manuscript itself, which probably dates from about 1225, and its copy, Hg, which was written about 1250. Sc is currently part of the Red Book of the Exchequer held by The National Archives. Hg is held by the British Library and is catalogued as Hargrave MS 313. It consists of folios 5 through 14a of the manuscript.

Four other extant manuscripts belong to the "London" tradition, and three other now-lost manuscripts are also known to have belonged to this grouping. The surviving manuscripts are known as K, Co, Or, and Rs. The three lost manuscripts have been assigned the names of Gi, Sl, and Tw. K is a manuscript currently in the British Library and was part of the Cotton Library before becoming part of the British Museum, then the British Library. Given the catalogue name of Cotton Claudius D II, it is the only illuminated manuscript of the Leges and dates to around 1310. Co is currently in the Corpus Christi College, Cambridge Library and was part of the Parker Library in the 16th century before being bequeathed to Corpus Christi on Parker's death. This manuscript dates to around 1320 and is catalogued as Corpus Christi College 70. The Leges occupies folios 108 through 170. The manuscript Or was originally part of the Oriel College, Oxford Library but is now part of the Bodleian Library. It dates from around 1330 and is catalogued as Oriel College 46. The last extant manuscript is Rs, which is currently in the John Rylands Library in Manchester. It was written about 1201 and is catalogued as Rylands lat.155.

The three known but now-lost manuscripts included Gi, which was known in 1721 and was owned by the London Guildhall. It was used by David Wilkins to compile his 1721 work Leges Anglo-Saxonicae as well by Henry Spelman to correct manuscripts used in the Epistola Eleutherii. The Sl manuscript belonged to John Selden in the 17th century, but it is unclear when it was created. It was used by Roger Twysden in his edition of the Leges Henrici Primi. The last securely known lost manuscript is the Tw manuscript, and was used by Twysden in his edition of the Leges, and was perhaps owned by him also.

Possibly two other manuscripts existed, but little is known about them. One is often designated Sp, and was used by Spelman for his 1625 Glossarium Archaiollogicum, for which he used three manuscripts of the Leges – Sc, K and one that he does not name but has subsequently been designated as Sp. It appears to have belonged to the London grouping and may have been Gi rather than a separate manuscript, although Spelman's description and usage are unclear as to which possibility is most likely. The other possible manuscript was one that Wilkins referred to as "quod iudetur fuisse Archiepiscopi aut Monachorum Cantuar", but it has not been found in searches of Lambeth Palace Library or the various Canterbury repositories.

Besides the medieval manuscripts, there are three early modern transcriptions of the work – one from the 16th century now at the Cambridge University Library as manuscript Dd.VI 38, the second at Trinity College, Cambridge from the 17th century, catalogued as Cambridge O.10,20, and the last in the British Library as Harley MS 785, also dating from the 17th century.

== Publishing history ==
The first complete printed edition of the Leges appeared in 1644, as an appendix to a new edition of the Arcaionomia prepared by Abraham Wheelock. The actual text of the Leges was edited by Twysden. Prior to this, two other scholars, William Lambarde and Spelman, had intended to produce printed editions of the Leges, but were unable to follow through on the project. A portion of the Leges had earlier appeared in Edward Coke's Institutes of the Laws of England in 1628. Another edition appeared in 1721, with Wilkins' publication of the Leges Anglo-Saxonicae, which built on the work of William Somner between 1645 and 1652. In 1776, David Hoüard reprinted Wilkins' text of the Leges in the Traites sur les coutumes anglo-normandes, and in 1789 another reproduction of Wilkins' text appeared in Paulus Canciani's Barbarorum Legs Antiquae.

What is considered the first scholarly discussion of the Leges appeared in 1827 by George Phillips, who did not reproduce the entire text in his Englische Reichsund Rechtsgeschichte, but did provide a couple of extracts along with a discussion of the sources of the work and a description of the work. In 1840, the Record Commission published an edition of the text that had been edited by Richard Price and Benjamin Thorpe. The next major production of the Leges was Felix Liebermann who produced three volumes of Gesetze der Angelsachsen between 1903 and 1916, with the Leges being one of the legal treatises being reproduced in the Gesetze. A modern translation, with the original Latin text on pages facing the translation, was published in 1972 by the Clarendon Press and edited by L. J. Downer, and includes updated commentary and manuscript information.

== Legacy and influence ==
The work is an important historical source for the study of the Middle Ages. An edition was published along with other 12th-century legal treatises, in the Die Gesetze der Angelsachsen, and more recently, it has been studied by the historian L. J. Downer. The historian Patrick Wormald says of the Leges that it "has had more effect on views of English law before Henry II than any other".
