= Wantage Code =

Early English legal text

III Æthelred (III Atr)
- "Wantage Code"
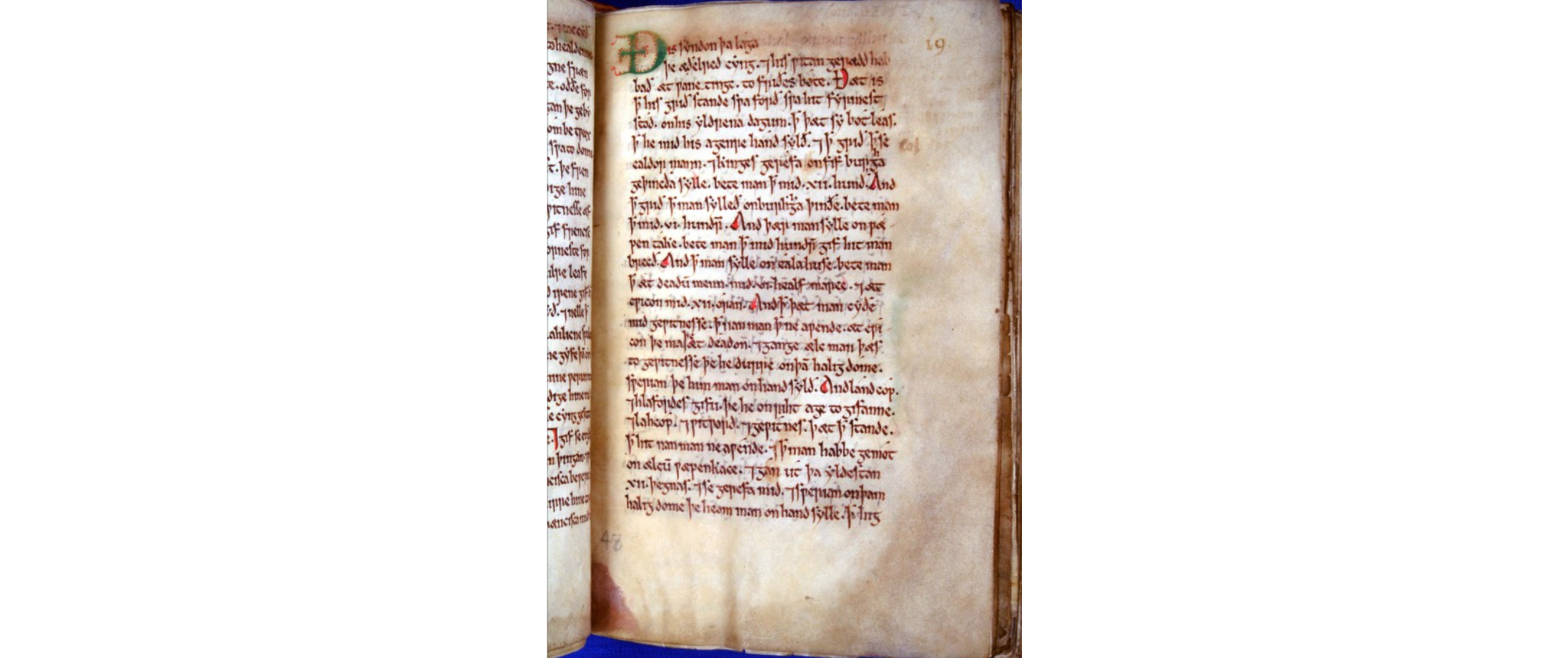
- Opening of the code in Textus Roffensis
- Ascribed to: Æthelred the Unready, king of England
- Language: Old English
- Date of issue: c. 997
- Manuscript(s): Strood, Medway Archive and Local Studies Centre, MS DRc/R1 (Textus Roffensis); London, British Library, MS Additional 49366; Manchester, John Rylands University Library, MS Lat. 420; London, British Library, MS Royal 11 B.II; London, British Library, MS Cotton Titus A.XXVII, fos. 140r-141r
- Principal manuscript(s): Textus Roffensis, folios 48r-49v
- Genre: law code

The Wantage Code, sometimes referred to as III Æthelred (abbreviated III Atr), is an early English legal text. Recorded in Old English, it is a record of laws that Æthelred the Unready (died 1016) and his councillors enacted at the royal manor of Wantage, Berkshire (now Oxfordshire).

The enactments of the code are devoted primarily to the management of disputes and clarifying legal procedure, in particular the regulation of fines relating to the peace. In the case of one provision, the text specifically mentions the Five Boroughs of the Danelaw, and the code is of particular historical significance for the Danelaw and Anglo-Scandinavian Britain.

== Provenance ==
The Wantage Code survives today in Old English within the manuscript known as Textus Roffensis, originating in the early twelfth century and preserved by the medieval bishops of Rochester; and in a Latin translation within Quadripartitus, another compilation work of similar date. It has been edited by Benjamin Thorpe (d. 1870), Felix Liebermann (d. 1925) and Agnes Jane Robertson (d. 1959), the last of whom also provided a translation.

The text takes its name from Wantage, Berkshire, the location named in the opening line of the text, "these are the constitutions which King Æthelred and his councillors have enacted at Wantage for the promotion of public security (to friðes bóte)". The enactment may have occurred in 997, the year that a royal assembly in Wantage is otherwise documented, though as historian Ann Williams has pointed out "there could have been other unrecorded meetings at the same place". Theoretically it could date any time in the king's reign, but since it lacks any trace of the influence of Archbishop Wulfstan II of York, it is likely to date before 1008 when the latter began drafting legal codes.

There are close similarities between the Wantage Code and the so-called "Woodstock Code", I Æthelred, and some historians have suggested that the former was an adaptation of the latter for use in the Danelaw, the region of eastern England heavily settled by migrant Scandinavians in the later ninth and early tenth centuries. Both texts make reference to an earlier, but otherwise undocumented, assembly at Bromdune. In the Quadripartitus tradition the text is extended with the incorporation of the "Laws of London" (IV Æthelred) along with tracts on Pax ("peace") and Walreaf ("corpse robbery").

Historian Levi Roach pointed out that the assembly at Wantage "witnessed one of the king's more prominent acts of repentance", a grant of 100 hides to Old Minster, Winchester. The act of promulgation of the code may have been part of a broader attempt by Æthelred to restore the standing of his kingship in light of his "sins" back in the 980s.

== Content and significance ==
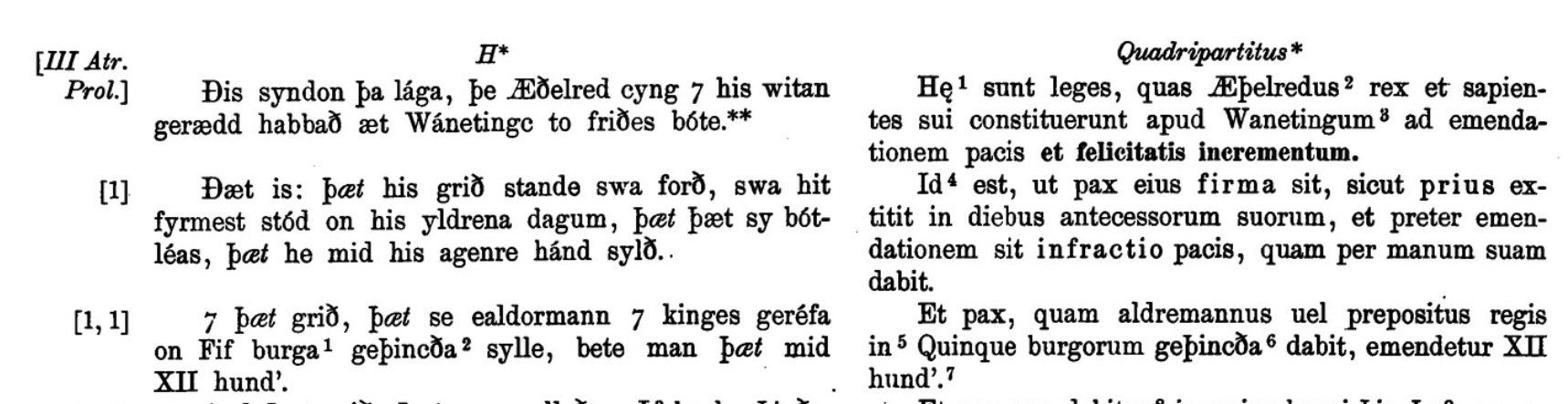
Opening clauses of the Wantage Code printed in the edition of Felix Liebermann, with the Old English of Textus Roffensis and the Latin of Quadripartitus side by side.

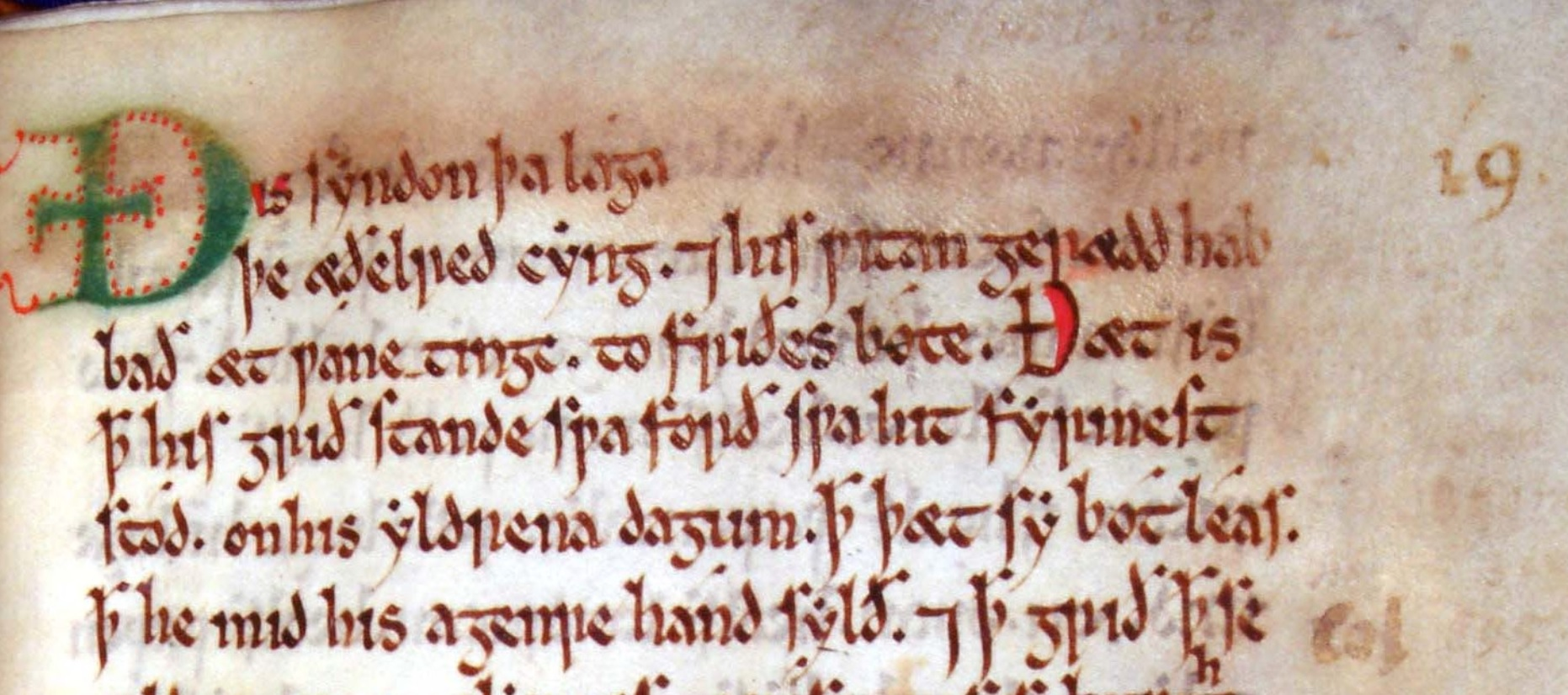
Opening folio of the Wantage Code in Textus Roffensis.

Provisions	Description
Prologue	Names king, place of issue and purpose.
1	Fines for breaches of various types of peace
2	Witnesses
3 –5	Transfers of property, wapentake courts and thieves
6–7	Ordeals and clearing accusations
8	False moneyers
9	Requirement of witnesses to killing of animals
10	Outlawry
11	King's thegns
12	Actions brought by the king
13	Harbouring thieves
14	Unchallenged occupation of property
15	Daylight robbery
16	Moneyers working outside towns

Although mirroring elements of I Æthelred, the Wantage Code seems to be designed to be more 'aggressive', with provisions accompanied by heavier fines and stronger punishments. Historian Jake Stattel has argued that incentives of the code were designed to encourage private settlements. Some historians have conceived of the code as part of an effort to integrate formerly independent "Danish" areas into the emerging kingdom of England.

The scholars of the 21st-century Early English Laws AHRC-funded research project in the United Kingdom noted that the code contains what is "perhaps the earliest description of a jury of presentment" A provision (3 §1) declared that "[A] court shall be held in every wapentake, and the twelve leading thegns along with the reeve shall go out and swear on the relics which are given into their hands, that they will not accuse any innocent man or shield any guilty one".

Historian Charlotte Neff pointed out that the same group of thegns appear to function like a modern judge or jury elsewhere, with another provision (13 §2) stating that "a verdict in which the thegns are unanimous shall be held valid" and adding that "if they disagree, the verdict of eight of them shall be valid, and those who are outvoted in such a case shall each pay 6 half-marks".

== The Danelaw ==
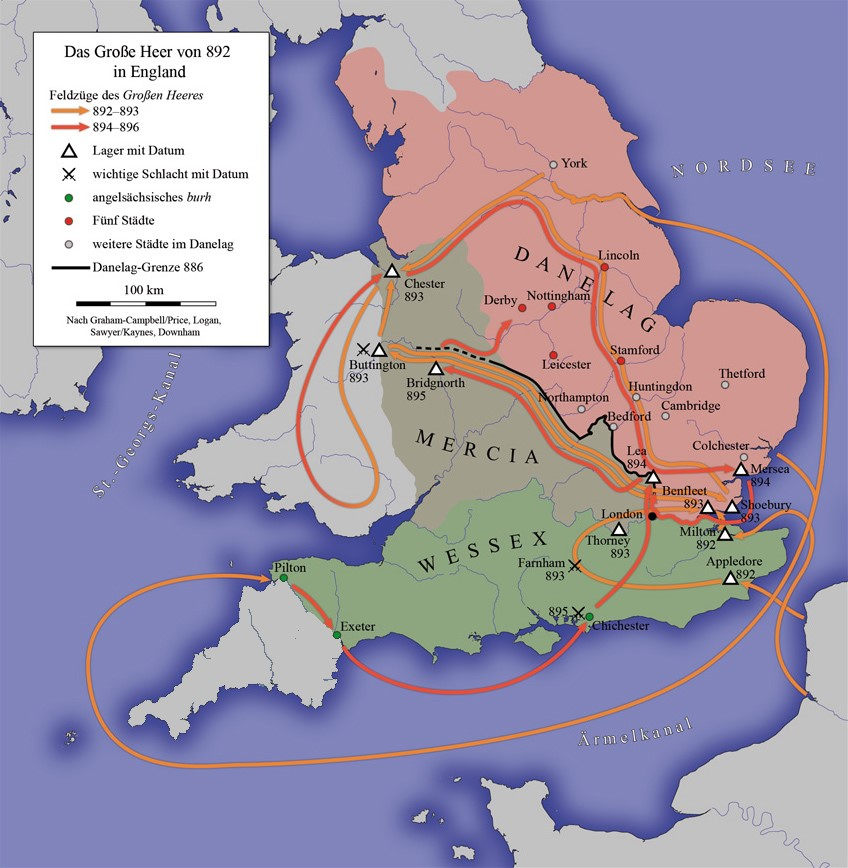
Map of England showing the English realms and Danish districts – from Cassell's History of England, with the Danelaw in pink.

As a historical source, the code is particularly important for the Danelaw. Within that area itself, the text specifically refers to the Five Boroughs, with clause 1 §1 naming specific fines for "breach of the peace which the ealdorman or the king's reeve establishes in the court of the Five Boroughs". It is generally agreed that the five in question were Lincoln, Stamford, Leicester, Nottingham and Derby, and the code appears to be the earliest reference to the 'Five Boroughs' as an institution.

Within the Wantage Code there are provisions concerning the jurisdiction of the wapentake (Old English: wǣpen(ge)tæc; Old Norse: vápnatak), an area of local administration unique to Anglo-Scandinavian Britain that by the time of Domesday Book was seen as analogous to the West Saxon hundred. These units are found in the area covered by the rural hinterland of the Five Boroughs, what would become Lincolnshire, Leicestershire, Nottinghamshire and Derbyshire, but also in Yorkshire, County Durham, Northamptonshire, Cheshire and Cumberland. The name is thought to derive from the practice of "taking weapons" from those gathered at local assemblies, with a view to limiting violence and the escalation of conflict among the participants.

The text itself refers to the promulgations as lagu, "law", one of the earliest authentic Old English borrowings of the Norse word lǫg. It contains a number of other Scandinavian words, such as lahcop ("law purchase"), landcop ("[tax on] land purchase"), and witword ("wise word", possibly meaning "witness" or "agreement", or else denoting a plausible claim to a property), indicating respect for pre-existing legal custom in "Danish" England. Neff noted that "the fines and payments are in all cases stated in Scandinavian terms", including "hundreds (of silver ores), ores and marks".
