= Doom book =

Code of laws compiled by Alfred the Great

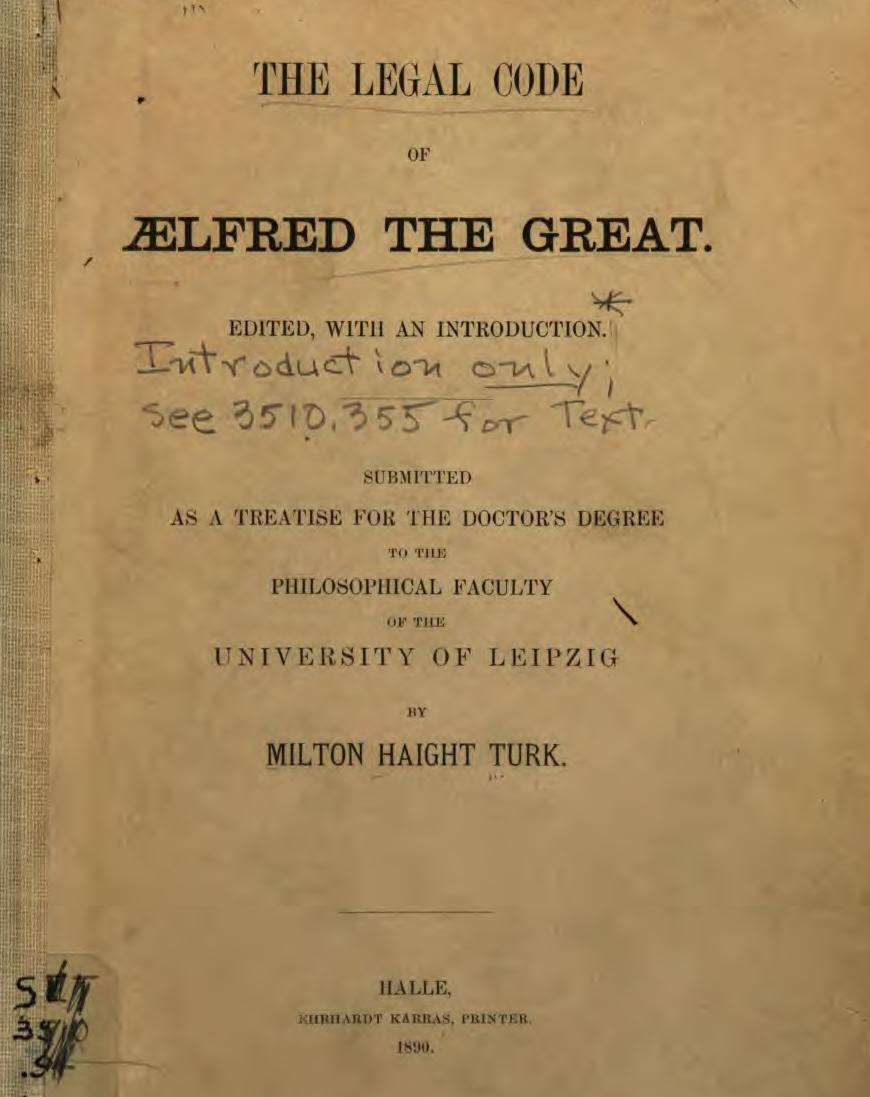
The Legal Code of Ælfred the Great, by Milton Haight Turk, 1890

The Doom Book, Dōmbōc, Code of Alfred or Legal Code of Ælfred the Great was the code of laws ("dooms" being laws or judgments) compiled by Alfred the Great (c. 893 AD). Alfred codified three prior Saxon codes – those of Æthelberht of Kent (c. 602 AD), Ine of Wessex (c. 694 AD) and Offa of Mercia (c. 786 AD) – to which he prefixed a modified version of the Ten Commandments of Moses and incorporated rules of life from the Mosaic Code and the Christian code of ethics.

== Contents ==
The title Doom Book (Old English dōm-bōc) comes from the Old English word dōm meaning judgment or law – as in Alfred's admonishment, "Judge thou very evenly: judge thou not one doom to the rich, another to the poor; nor one to thy friend, another to thy foe, judge thou." This reflects Mosaic Law, which says, "You shall not render an unjust judgment; you shall not be partial to the poor or defer to the great: with justice you shall judge your neighbor."

The Christian theologian F. N. Lee extensively documented Alfred the Great's work of collecting the law codes from the three Christian Saxon kingdoms and compiling them into his Doom Book. Lee details how Alfred incorporated the principles of the Mosaic law into his Code, and how this Code of Alfred became the foundation for the Common Law.

In the book's extensive prologue, Alfred summarises the Mosaic and Christian codes. Michael Treschow, UBC Faculty of Creative and Critical Studies, reviewed how Alfred laid the foundation for the Spirit of Mercy in his code, stating that the last section of the Prologue not only describes "a tradition of Christian law from which the law code draws but also it grounds secular law upon Scripture, especially upon the principle of mercy".

The law code contains some laws that may seem bizarre by modern standards, such as: "If a man unintentionally kills another man by letting a tree fall on him, the tree shall be given to the kinsmen of the slain." On the other hand, this precept may have anticipated the future common law of negligence, which provides that a person who is injured by the unintentional carelessness of another is entitled to recover compensation for his or her injury. In the context of the aforementioned law, the felled tree would be a valuable commodity.

== Manuscripts ==
Manuscripts containing the Old English text are:

- Cambridge, Corpus Christi College 173 (also known as the Parker Chronicle)
- Cambridge, Corpus Christi College 383 (also known as the Treaty of Alfred and Guthrum)
- London, British Library, Cotton MS Nero A I
- London, British Library, Cotton MS Otho B XI
- London, British Library, Burney MS 277
- Rochester Cathedral Library A. 3. 5 (also known as the Textus Roffensis)

The text was translated into Latin during the reign of Cnut as the third part of the Instituta Cnuti, and survives in the following manuscripts:

- Rochester Cathedral Library A. 3. 5 (the Textus Roffensis)
- London, British Library Cotton MS Titus A XXVII
- Paris, Bibliothèque Nationale, Colbert 3,860
- Oxford, Bodleian Library, MS. Rawlinson C. 641

The text was independently translated into Latin a second time during the reign of Henry I as part of the Latin compilation known as Quadripartitus, which survives in ten manuscripts.

== Editions and translations ==
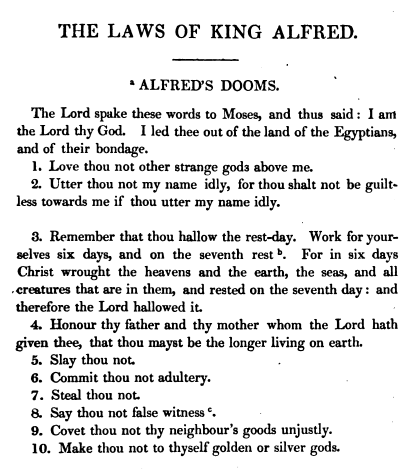
First page of the laws of King Alfred

- Alfred (1973). Turk, Milton Haight (ed.). The Legal Code of Alfred the Great. AMS Press. ISBN 0-404-56546-8.
- ——— (2004). Turk, Milton Haight (ed.). The Legal Code of Ælfred the Great. Lawbook Exchange. ISBN 1-58477-392-8.
- Liebermann, F. (ed.), Die Gesetze der Angelsachsen [The Laws of the Anglo-Saxons], 3 vols (Halle a. S.: Niemeyer, 1903–16; still the definitive critical edition)
- Simon Keynes and Michael Lapidge (trans.), 1983, Alfred the Great: Asser's "Life of King Alfred" and Other Contemporary Sources London: Penguin, pp. 163–70 (translated extracts)
- Todd Preston, 2012, King Alfred’s Book of Laws: A Study of the Domboc and Its Influence on English Identity, With a Complete translation Jefferson, NC: McFarland, pp. 105–48 (diplomatic text and translation based on Cambridge, Corpus Christi College, MS 173)
