= Leges Edwardi Confessoris =

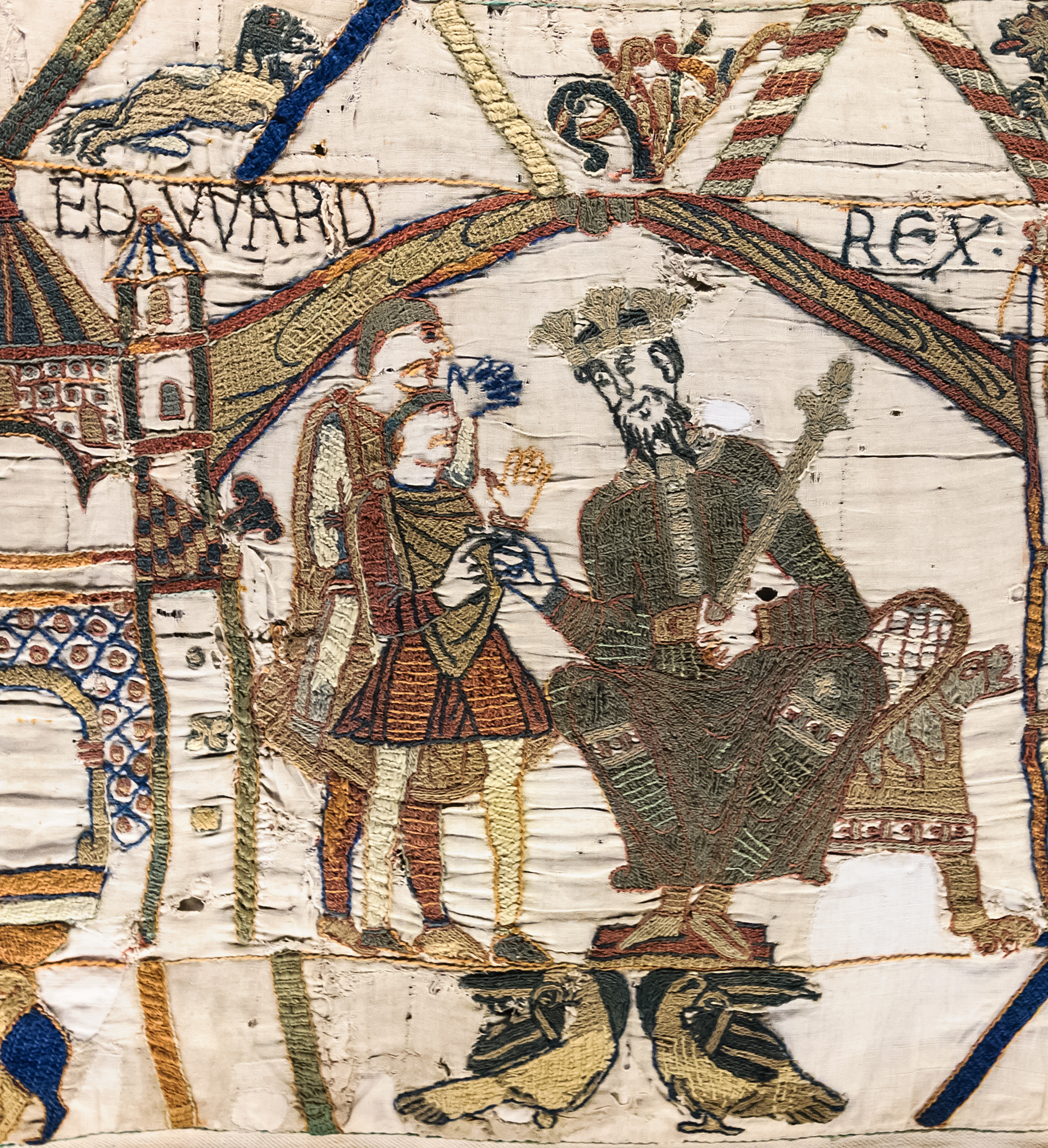
Edward the Confessor, supposed issuer of the Leges Edwardi Confessoris

The title Leges Edwardi Confessoris, or Laws of Edward the Confessor, refers to a collection of laws, purporting to represent English law in the time of Edward the Confessor (reigned 1042–1066), as recited to the Norman invader king William I in 1070, but which was not composed until probably the early years of the reign of King Stephen (r. 1135–1154).

== Background ==
The issue of continuity and change in post conquest England is a topic of significant debate in scholarship. By 1086, there were very few Englishmen among the 200 or so major landowners recorded in the Domesday Book. Normans, Flemings, Bretons and others had settled on the estates of dead, dispossessed or outlawed English nobility. Contemporary chroniclers were divided, with Henry of Huntingdon writing that the English people had been "delivered [up] for destruction by the violent and cunning Norman people", while William of Poitiers lauded the Norman victory at the Battle of Hastings and said the slaughter of the English had been just punishment for Harold Godwinson's "perjury".

The Leges Edwardi served the purpose of legitimizing the legacy of William the Conqueror's rule and distancing the 12th-century ruling class of England from their violent origins as conquerors. The treatise is believed to have been written sometime between 1130 and 1135, towards the end of Henry I's reign. Historians believe the treatise intended to recast Norman institutions as having Anglo-Saxon origins. The work's authority lay in its claim that the author had recorded the laws and customs that were spoken to William the Conqueror in 1070, four years after the Battle of Hastings by "English nobles who were wise men and learned in their law". The apocryphal account claims that William yielded to English demands to live under the English laws of Edward the Confessor or the laga Edwardi. The value of the treatise stems more from its influence on postconquest perceptions of Norman rule than the historicity of the author's claims about the treatise's origin.

The laga Edwardi is not a single law code, but rather is a descriptive term meaning the laws and customs of England that were observed prior to the Norman conquest. English bishops like Dunstan and Wulfstan wrote the laws of Edgar, Æthelred the Unready and Cnut. Most of these preconquest law codes, including Instituta Cnuti, have only survived in postconquest Church compilations the earliest of which is the Textus Roffensis, dated to around 1123. William's purported acceptance of the laga Edwardi symbolized the continuity from Edward the Confessor's reign to his own, perhaps seeking to minimize the disruption caused by the conquest in 1066.

== Leges Edwardi ==
Prior to the 17th century the Leges Edwardi Confessoris had several titles variously attributing the treatise to Edward or William. It is one of the four major treatises on the laga Edwardi. The others are the Willelmi articuli decem, Leis Willelme, and Leges Henrici Primi.

The Leges Edwardi is not directly based upon any known sources of preconquest laws, instead borrowing at times from a Frankish text. In the absence of evidence, scholars have debated the extent to which the earlier Danelaw may have influenced the Leges Edwardi. The treatise itself claimed that the origins of the murder fine could be traced back to Cnut. This fine was imposed on the entire vill or hundred whenever a Norman was found slain. The Leges Edwardi says the practice was first introduced by Cnut to protect the Danes from the English. This claim was accepted by the 13th century legal writer Bracton. Felix Liebermann has argued that the assertion of Danish origins was an invention intended to shift the blame for the fine to the previous Danish rulers, but other scholars have disputed this.

The primary concerns of the text lay with the king's peace and the peace of the Holy Church, especially in the North Midlands and Yorkshire region bordering on the Danelaw. Although the emphasis is on common law, the same text shows that there were regional differences.

[12] Pax regia multiplex est; alia data manu sua, quam Angli uocant kinges hand salde grid; [12a] alia die qua primum coronatus est, ipsa habet viii dies; in Natali Domini viii dies et octo dies Pasche et octo Pentecostes; [12b] alia per breue suum data; [12c] alia quam habent iiii chemini, id est Watlingestrete, Fosse, Hykenildstrete, Erningstrete, quorum duo in longitudinem regni, alii uero in latitudinem distenduntur.

"[12] There are many types of the king's peace; one is given by his hand, which the English call kinges hand salde grid; [12a] another [is given] on the day on which he is first crowned — this one lasts for eight days; at Christmas eight days and eight days at Easter and eight days at Pentecost; [12b] another is given by his writ; [12c] another which the four roads have, that is Watling Street, Fosse Way, Iknield Way, and Ermine Street, of which two extend for the length of the kingdom, the others across the width."

Other points of interest include references to the wapentake, the reeve of the riding, Peter's Pence, murder fines (murdrum), consciousness about England's Saxon heritage, and the legal position of Jews in England.

The most recent editor, Bruce O'Brien, has speculated that the popularity of the treatise may have been due to its portrayal of "a Norman king interested in preserving and maintaining" the native laws of the English nobility. The Leges Edwardi argues that what the work offers instead are "apparently original observations of and comments on the English law of the author's day."

== Influence ==
Aided by the Confessor's legendary reputation as a lawgiver, the compilation enjoyed considerable interest in medieval England. The text is found in a large number of manuscripts. Four recensions have been distinguished, two of which are revisions with additional material being grafted on to the core of the text.

A version of the Leges Edwardi Confessoris was known to Henry de Bracton and to the barons and jurists responsible for Magna Carta.

In 17th century, during the controversy about the ancient constitution of England, Leges Edwardi Confessoris was frequently used as support for the antiquity of the House of Commons.
