= Quadripartitus =

Legal collection compiled during the reign of Henry I, king of England (1100–1135)

- Language: medieval Latin
- Manuscript(s): Six manuscript classes:
- 1. BL, Cotton MS Domitian viii, fos. 96r-110v 2. Manchester, John Rylands Library Latin MS 420; 3. BL, Royal MS 11.B.ii, fos. 103r-166v 4. BL, Add MS 49366; 5. BL, Cotton MS Titus A.xxvii, fos. 89r-174v 6. London Collection: 6a. Manchester, John Rylands Library, Latin MS 155 (+ BL, Add MS 14252); 6b. BL, Cotton MS Claudius D.ii; 6c. Cambridge, CCC, MSS 70 and 258; 6d. Oxford, Oriel College, MS 46.
- Genre: legal compilation

The title Quadripartitus refers to an extensive legal collection compiled during the reign of Henry I, king of England (1100–1135). The work consists of Anglo-Saxon legal materials in Latin translation as well as a number of Latin texts of legal interest that were produced after the Conquest. It ranks as the largest surviving medieval collection of pre-Conquest law and is the second to have been produced during Henry I's reign, after that contained in Cambridge, Corpus Christi College MS 383. First compiled for the use of Henry I's jurists and administrators, the Quadripartitus enjoyed immense interest for a considerable time afterwards and was consulted by legal scholars, including Henry de Bracton in the thirteenth century and John Fortescue in the fifteenth.

== Manuscripts ==
No original manuscript is extant, but copies survive in six classes of manuscripts:

1. BL, Cotton MS Domitian viii, fos. 96r-110v. Incomplete. The manuscript has been tentatively dated to the 1120s and stands out as the oldest witness of the Quadripartitus. It is the only manuscript to preserve both prefaces and gives the text for only two law-codes, after which the manuscript breaks off.
2. Manchester, John Rylands Library Latin MS 420. Mid-12th century. According to a 16th-century note on the flyleaf, the first 20 folios are lost.
3. BL, Royal MS 11.B.ii, fos. 103r-166v
4. BL, Add MS 49366
5. BL, Cotton MS Titus A.xxvii, fos. 89r-174v
6. The London Collection is represented by four copies. It incorporates later material up to Henry's reign, such as the Leges Henrici Primi and the Genealogia ducum Normannorum.

6a. Manchester, John Rylands Library, Latin MS 155 (+ British Library, Add MS 14252)
6b. BL, Cotton MS Claudius D.ii
6c. Cambridge, CCC, MSS 70 and 258
6d. Oxford, Oriel College, MS 46.

The compilation of the Quadripartitus was an ambitious project which took many years to complete. The first preface, the Dedicatio, which may have been present only in the first draft of the work (see below), shows no intrinsic sign of having been written later than 1100, and neither does the first volume. This suggests that the work was well underway by the beginning of Henry's reign. The second preface, known as the Argumentum, frequently refers to Henry's succession as heralding the return of law and order to English society. The second volume contains material composed during Henry's reign and refers to a royal council held at London in May (Pentecost) 1108, attended among others by Urse d'Abetôt (d. 1108). Liebermann assigned the completion of the work to a date between 1113 and 1118, basing this terminus ante quem on the mention of Henry's victories over the "rages of the Bretons" in Argumentum § 16, which he took to refer to the king's claim of sovereignty as recognised by King Louis VI of France in 1113. Richard Sharpe, however, argues that the wording of the text is too general to allow for any such historically specific interpretation. He dates the completion of the first draft to between 1108 and 1118, with a date nearer the early part of this range.

According to Patrick Wormald, the anonymous author continually worked on and revised the collection. Since copies were made and sent out during the process, the author's shifting perceptions and intentions are reflected in the numerous amendments to and rearrangements of the texts which are encountered in the various manuscripts.

The author's Latin is at times notoriously opaque, which some scholars have ascribed to lack of training and skill. However, Richard Sharpe has argued that the author was proficient in Latin and well at home with classical literature, but shows a preference for rhetorical flourish which often makes his writing difficult to penetrate. In spite of these difficulties, it is the use of Latin rather than an archaic form of English which has contributed to the pre-eminent position of the work in later ages and in effect to its survival to the present day.

== Authorship and purpose ==
The author is unknown, but the work was presumably prepared by the same jurist who was responsible for drafting the Leges Henrici Primi. He was not a native English speaker, and often struggled to grasp the sense of his originals, although a learning process can be detected in several manuscript versions, which reveal that he occasionally corrected his translations. The history of transmission may also suggest that the discovery of new manuscripts changed the author's mind about the appropriate order in which the legal texts were to be arranged.

The title Quadripartitus ("Divided into four") has been used by historians since Felix Liebermann adopted it in his edition and studies of the work near the start of the 20th century. The title, which is found in a 16th-century note on the flyleaf of John Rylands Library Latin MS 420, reflects what the author set out in his Argumentum (clause 32), namely that his original design was to produce four volumes. However, the surviving collection only comprises the first two volumes, while plans for the remaining two, one on lawsuits and their proceedings and the other on theft, never came to fruition. The two prefaces, Dedicatio and Argumentum, show that the collection was not merely intended to serve as an antiquarian encyclopedia of obsolete laws and customs.

== Contents ==
Two prefaces are appended to the work. The Dedicatio, which survives only in Cotton MS Domitian viii, is a dedication addressed to an anonymous patron and friend of the author. It may have been written at an early stage of the work and was presumably omitted from later drafts. The second preface is the Argumentum, which sets out the argument of the work, with reference to the contemporary state of affairs in the kingdom. Its sole preservation in Cotton MS Domitian viii, Cotton MS Titus A xxvii and a transcript from a Worcester manuscript suggests that it was omitted after the second draft. The author here deplores the moral decay that has marked the reign of William (II) Rufus and expresses some hope that Henry's rule will bring about changes for the better.

The largest assembly of texts is contained in the first part of the work (I). This material includes a good portion of the law-codes that were issued by Anglo-Saxon kings, from King Ine of Wessex (appended to King Alfred's domboc) to King Cnut, all in Latin translation. A couple of these do not survive elsewhere. In addition, the author included legal treatises on a variety of topics, some associated with Wulfstan, Archbishop of York. The second, briefer part of the work is devoted to documents of legal interest written (in Latin) at a later date, such as Henry I's Coronation Charter and his writ on Courts.

The following table of contents is based on that compiled by Patrick Wormald. Texts marked by an asterisk (*) are not originally part of the collection, while those placed between square brackets ([]) were inserted into the manuscripts by other scribes.

BL, Cotton MS Domitian viii	John Rylands Library Latin MS 420	BL, Royal MS 11 B ii	BL, Add MS 49366	BL, Cotton MS Titus A xxvii	London Collection
Volume I: English works in Latin translation
Dedicatio					*Geographical
Argumentum		Argumentum 32	[Argumentum]	Argumentum	Ine
I-II Cnut		I-II Cnut	I-II Cnut	I-II Cnut	Blaserum
Alfred ...	... Ine	Alfred-Ine	Alfred-Ine	Alfred-Ine	Forfang
	I-II Æthelstan	I-II Æthelstan	I-II Æthelstan	I-II Æthelstan	Hundred Ordinance
	Episcopus	Ordal	Episcopus	Episcopus	*Historical
	Norðleoda laga	Episcopus	Norðleoda laga	Norðleoda laga	Alfred
	Mircna laga	Norðleoda laga	Mircna laga	Mircna laga	Alfred-Guthrum
	Að	Geþyncðu	Að	Að	Alfred-Guthrum Appendix
	Hadbot	Mircna laga	Hadbot	Hadbot	Peace of Edward and Guthrum
	Blaserum	Að	Blaserum	Blaserum	*Historical
	Forfang	Hadbot	Forfang	Forfang	I-II Æthelstan
	Hundred Ordinance	Blaserum	Hundred Ordinance	Hundred Ordinance	Episcopus
	III-VI Æthelstan	Forfang	III-VI Æthelstan	III-VI Æthelstan	Norðleoda laga
	Ordal	Hundred Ordinance	Ordal	Ordal	Mircna laga
	I and III Æthelred	III-VI Æthelstan	I and III Æthelred	Alfred-Guthrum	Að
	Pax		Pax	Alfred-Guthrum Appendix	Hadbot
	Walreaf	Peace of Edward and Guthrum 9 ff.	Walreaf	Peace of Edward and Guthrum	III-VI Æthelstan
	IV Æthelred		IV Æthelred	I-II Edward	Ordal
	II Æthelred	II Edmund	II Æthelred	I-II Edmund	*Historical
	Dunsæte	Swerian	Dunsæte	Swerian	I-II Cnut
	VII Æthelred	Wifmannes Beweddung	VII Æthelred	Wifmannes Beweddung	*Historical
	Iudex	Wergeld	Iudex	Wergeld
	II-III Edgar	III Æthelred	II-III Edgar	I and III Æthelred
	Alfred-Guthrum	Pax	Alfred-Guthrum	Pax
	Alfred-Guthrum Appendix	Walreaf	Alfred-Guthrum Appendix	Walreaf
	Peace of Edward and Guthrum	IV Æthelred	Peace of Edward and Guthrum	IV Æthelred
	I-II Edward	II Æthelred	I-II Edward	II Æthelred
	I-III Edmund	Dunsæte	I-III Edmund	Dunsæte
	Swerian		Swerian	VII Æthelred
	Wifmannes Beweddung	Iudex	Wifmannes Beweddung	Iudex
	Wergeld		Wergeld	II-III Edgar
				III Edmund
	William I's On Exculpation		William I's On Exculpation	William I's On Exculpation
		Rectitudines singularum personarum		*William I's Articles
	Geþyncðu	William I's On Exculpation	Geþyncðu	Geþyncðu
	Rectitudines singularum personarum		Rectitudines singularum personarum	Rectitudines singularum personarum
Volume II: Writings from the author's own day
				Praefatio	*William I's Articles
	Henry I's Coronation Charter		Henry I's Coronation Charter	Henry I's Coronation Charter	*Leges Edwardi Confessoris
	II 4-8:3, 18		II 4-8:3, 18	II 4-18	*Genealogia ducum Normannorum
	Henry I's writ on Courts		Henry I's writ on Courts	Henry I's writ on Courts	*Historical
	*[Tr. Winch.]		*[Pseudo-Ulpian]	*Instituta Cnuti	Henry I's Coronation Charter
			*[Leis Willelme]		*Henry I's London Charter
			*[Leges Edwardi Confessoris]		*Leges Henrici Primi
			*[Consiliatio Cnuti]		*etc.
