= Treaty of Alfred and Guthrum =

Treaty between Wessex and East Anglia

The Treaty of Alfred and Guthrum is a 9th-century peace agreement between Alfred of Wessex and Guthrum, the Viking ruler of East Anglia. It sets out the boundaries between Alfred and Guthrum's territories as well as agreements on peaceful trade, and the weregild value of its people.

== Background ==
In 865, the Great Heathen Army landed in East Anglia with the intention of conquering all of the English kingdoms. During its campaign, the Viking army conquered the kingdoms of East Anglia, Mercia, and Northumbria. It initially overran the Kingdom of Wessex, but Danish King Guthrum was defeated by Alfred's army at the Battle of Edington in 878. Under the terms of his surrender, shortly afterward, Guthrum was obliged to be baptised (Note: Guthrum's baptismal name was Æthelstan on his conversion to Christianity in 878.) to endorse the agreement, as well as to allow him to rule more legitimately over his Christian vassals but remaining pagan to his pagan vassals. He was then with his army to leave Wessex. That agreement is known as the Treaty of Wedmore.

Sometime (Note: The actual date is not known. The treaty of Alfred and Guthrum ascribes Viking-held London to Alfred, so some historians have suggested that the treaty would not have been finalised until Alfred reoccupied the city in 886. However the Anglo-Saxon Chronicle for 885 says that "... the army from East-Anglia broke their peace with Alfred", which might indicate that the treaty had been signed earlier.) after Wedmore, a treaty was agreed that set out the lasting peace terms between the two kings, which is known as the Treaty of Alfred and Guthrum. The treaty is one of the few existing documents (Note: There are only three surviving documents from the Anglo-Saxon period that can be described as peace treaties.) of Alfred's reign and survives in Old English in Corpus Christi College, Cambridge, Manuscript 383, and in a Latin compilation, known as Quadripartitus.

The year that the treaty was created is not known for sure, but is believed to have been between 878 and Guthrum's death in 890.

The prologue to the treaty was a legitimisation of the territory that was held by both parties: Guthrum's landholdings in East Anglia and Alfred's in Mercia. Clauses 2 and 3 specify the blood money (or weregild), that is the value of men based on their status. The other clauses are concerned with the purchase of men, horses and oxen. There is also provision for hostages as a guarantee of good faith for one side trading with the other.

== Terms ==
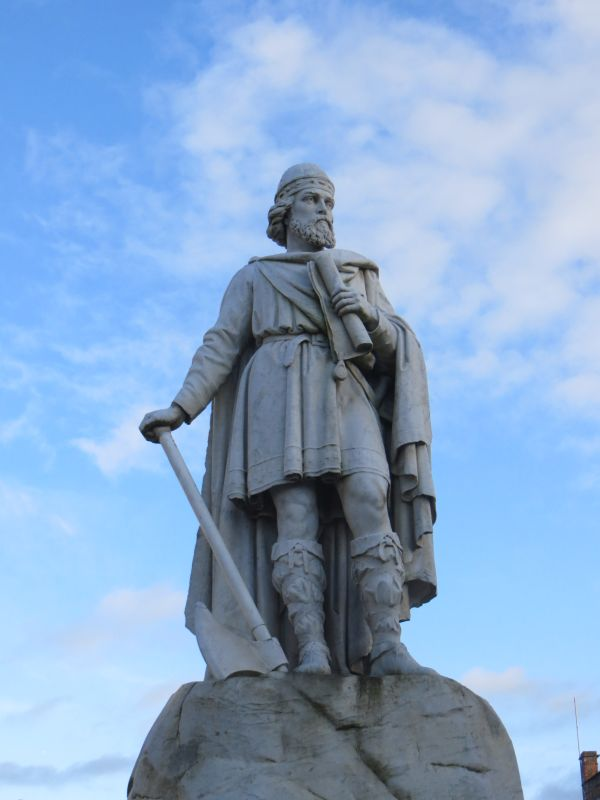
Statue of King Alfred at Wantage.

Map illustrating the boundaries of Alfred's territory (gold) and Guthrum's (pink)

There is more than one version of the treaty recorded. The original documents were written in Old English. (Note: A collection of legal documents were compiled in the late eleventh or early twelfth century. Within this collection known as the CCCC MS 383: Anglo-Saxon Laws there is the copy of the Treaty of Alfred and Guthrum. The copy written mainly in Latin is held by Corpus Christi College Cambridge.) The following version was translated by Frederick Attenborough:

Prologue: These are the terms of peace which King Alfred and King Guthrum, and the councillors of all the English nation, and all the people who dwell in East Anglia, have all agreed upon and confirmed with oaths, on their own behalf and for their subjects both living and unborn, who are anxious for Gods favour and ours.

1. First as to the boundaries between us. [They shall run] up the Thames, and then up (Note: See ASC 895 for meaning of 'up') the Lea, and along the Lea to its source, (Note: Traditionally placed in the vicinity of Waulud's Bank, Bedfordshire.) then in a straight line to Bedford, and then up the Ouse to Watling Street.
2. Secondly, if a man is slain, whether he is an Englishman or a Dane, all of us shall place the same value on his life — namely 8 half-marks (Note: A mark was a Scandinavian weight about 3,440–3,520 grains. 8 half-marks is equivalent to 7 1/4 troy ounces or 225 grams.) of pure gold, with the exception of commoners who occupy tributary land, (Note: All of the ceorl class who do not farm land of their own.) and freedmen of the Danes. These also shall be valued at the same amount — [namely] 200 shillings — in either case.
3. If anyone accuses a king's thegn of homicide, if he dares to clear himself, he shall do so with [the oaths of] twelve king's thegns. If anyone accuses a man who belongs to a lower order than that of king's thegn, he shall clear him-self with [the oaths of] eleven of his equals and one king's thegn. And this law shall apply to every suit which involves an amount greater than 4 mancusses. (Note: A gold coin; four mancusses weighed about 17 grams, 0.55 troy ounce.) And if he [the accused] dare not [attempt to clear himself], he shall pay [as compensation] three times the amount at which the stolen property is valued.
4. Every man shall have knowledge of his warrantor when he buys slaves, or horses, or oxen.
5. And we all declared, on the day when the oaths were sworn, that neither slaves nor freemen should be allowed to pass over to the Danish host without permission, any more than that any of them [should come over] to us. If, however, it happens that any of them, in order to satisfy their wants, wish to trade with us, or we [for the same reason wish to trade] with them, in cattle and in goods, it shall be allowed on condition that hostages are given as security for peaceful behaviour, and as evidence by which it may be known that no treachery is intended.

— Attenborough 1922, pp. 96–101

== See also ==
- Treaty of Wedmore
- List of treaties

== Bibliography ==
- Asser (1983). "Life of King Alfred". In Keynes, Simon; Lapidge, Michael (eds.). Alfred the Great: Asser's Life of King Alfred & Other Contemporary Sources. Penguin Classics. ISBN 978-0-14-044409-4.
- Attenborough, F.L. Tr, ed. (1922). "Treaties with the Danes". The laws of the earliest English kings. Cambridge: Cambridge University Press. OCLC 4296219.
- Giles, J.A. (1914). The Anglo-Saxon Chronicle (ASC 895) . London: G. Bell and Sons Ltd. – via Wikisource.
- Lapidge, Michael; Blair, John; Keynes, Simon; Scragg, Donald, eds. (2001). The Blackwell Encyclopaedia of Anglo-Saxon England. London: Blackwell. ISBN 0-631-22492-0.
- Lavelle, Ryan (2010). Alfred's Wars Sources and Interpretations of Anglo-Saxon Warfare in the Viking Age. Woodbridge, Suffolk: Boydel Press. ISBN 978-1-84383-569-1.
- Oliver, Neil (2012). Vikings. A History. London: Weidenfeld & Nicolson. ISBN 978-0-297-86787-6.
- Smyth, Alfred P. (1995). King Alfred the Great. Oxford: Oxford University Press. ISBN 0-19-822989-5.
- Whitelock, Dorothy, ed. (1996). The treaty between Alfred and Guthrum. English Historical Documents. Vol. 1 (2 ed.). Oxford: Routledge. ISBN 0-203-43950-3.
