= Geþyncðo =

Old English legal tract

- Also known as: Be wergeldum 7 be geðinðum (in Cambridge, CCC MS 201); Be leode geþincðum 7 lage (in Textus Roffensis); De veteri consuetudine promotionum (in Quadripartitus)
- Author(s): probably Wulfstan (II), Archbishop of York
- Language: Old English
- Manuscript(s): (1) Cambridge, Corpus Christi College, MS 201 (associated with Wulfstan); (2) Textus Roffensis; (3) Quadripartitus MSS.
- Genre: legal tract

Geþyncðo (also Geþyncðu), meaning “Dignities”, is the title given to an Old English legal tract on status and social mobility, probably written by Wulfstan (II), Archbishop of York between 1002 and 1023. It is sometimes known as one of the so-called 'promotion laws', along with Norðlleoda laga, and both these texts belong to a legal compilation on status, dubbed ‘the Geþyncðu group’ by the historian Patrick Wormald. Though the extent to which these reflect reality is a topic of some debate, they constitute one of the most valuable primary documents for an understanding of social status in late Anglo-Saxon England.

== The Geþyncðu group: manuscripts and texts ==
Taking the ‘Geþyncðu group’ as a whole, Patrick Wormald distinguishes between two classes of manuscripts. The first originates in Worcester and consists of copies of texts in two of Wulfstan's autograph manuscripts: (1) Cambridge, CCC, MS 201 ('D'), which contains all five documents of the group: Geþyncðo, Norðleoda laga (“North-people's law”), Mircna laga (“Mercian law”), Að (“Oath”) and Hadbot (“Compensation for the ordained”); and (2) Corpus 190 ('O'), which preserves only the last three. The second class was produced at a further remove from its original scriptorium. It is represented by two early 12th-century manuscript families: (a) the Textus Roffensis, a substantial collection of Old English law-texts with Latin translations, and (b) the various manuscripts of the Quadripartitus, which offer a vast array of legal texts in Latin translation only. On grounds of style and layout, Wormald argues that the second class of the Geþyncðu group goes back to a common exemplar containing a southern redaction of material from Worcester. This material may have reached Rochester via Canterbury. Both Textus Roffensis and Quadripartitus contain versions of Geþyncðu and Norðleoda laga.

As opposed to the law-codes issued by Anglo-Saxon kings, the five texts offer no official enactments, but they record what the author or compiler understood to have been church law and customary law in certain regions of England, such as Wessex, (West) Mercia, the Danelaw and Northumbria. The core of the group is made up by a number of texts on wergild.

== Authorship and date ==
Since 1950, when Dorothy Bethurum's study on the five documents of the group was published, the composition of Geþyncðu is usually attributed to Wulfstan (II), Archbishop of York between 1002 and 1023, who was also responsible for drafting official law-codes for kings Æthelred and Cnut. Wormald dates the text some time between 1008 and 1014, when the Sermo Lupi ad Anglos appears to have been written.

== Contents ==
The introductory statement says:

“Once it used to be that people and rights went by dignities [geþyncðo], and councillors of the people were then entitled to honour, each according to his rank, whether noble [eorl] or ceorl, retainer or lord.”

It lists the requirements of wealth and service by which a ceorl could rise to thegnhood:

"And if a ceorl prospered, that he possessed fully five hides of land of his own, a bell and a castle-gate, a seat and special office in the king's hall, then was he henceforth entitled to the rights of a thegn."

The text goes on to distinguish between four different types of thegn and their qualifications: at the top stood the thegn who rode in the king's household band (hired) and had a 'median thegn' to serve him and to represent him in court with a preliminary oath (for-að). A less privileged type is the king's thegn who was without any such representative. On the next level is the median thegn, who likewise held five hides of his own, but served a king's thegn, attended him in the king's hall and was qualified to represent him with an oath. Finally, there was also a lower type of median thegn, who did not (yet) meet these requirements of land and service. The southern redaction in the Textus Roffensis adds two further clauses. One is on the thegn who is promoted to earl (eorl) and acquires the rights of an earl, and the other on the merchant who becomes a thegn by virtue of having made three voyages at his own cost. The next clause proceeds with the ecclesiastical component to social promotion. In a general way, it asserts that the scholar who distinguished himself through learning and "took orders", was entitled to more honour and protection, provided that he remained chaste.

== Sources ==
- Abels, R.P. Lordship and Military Obligation in Anglo-Saxon England. London, 1988. pp. 108, 110, 112–3, 141–2.
- Bethurum, Dorothy. "Six Anonymous Old English Codes." Journal of English and Germanic Philology 49 (1950). 449–63.
- Charles-Edwards, T.M. “Kinship, Status and the Origin of the Hide.” Past and Present 56 (1972). pp. 3–33.
- Runciman, W.G. “Accelerating Social Mobility. The Case of Anglo-Saxon England.” Past and Present 104 (1984). 3-30.
- Stenton, Frank. "The Thriving of the Anglo-Saxon ceorl." In Preparatory to Anglo-Saxon England, ed. D.M. Stenton, Oxford 1970. pp. 383–93.
- Whitelock, Dorothy (tr.). English Historical Documents vol. 1, c. 500-1042. pp. 431–32 (no. 52) London, 1968.
- Williams, Ann. “A bell-house and a burh-geat. Lordly residences in England before the Norman Conquest.” In Anglo-Norman Castles, ed. Robert Liddiard. Woodbridge: Boydell, 2003. Previously published in Medieval Knighthood IV. Papers from the Fifth Strawberry Hill Conference 1990, ed. Ch. Harper-Bill and R.Harvey. Woodbridge, 1992. pp. 221–40.
- Wormald, Patrick. The Making of English Law: King Alfred to the Twelfth Century. Cambridge, MA: Blackwell, 1999.
