= Laws of London =

Medieval English legal text

IV Æthelred (IV Atr)
- The "Laws of London" or De institutis Lundoni(a)e
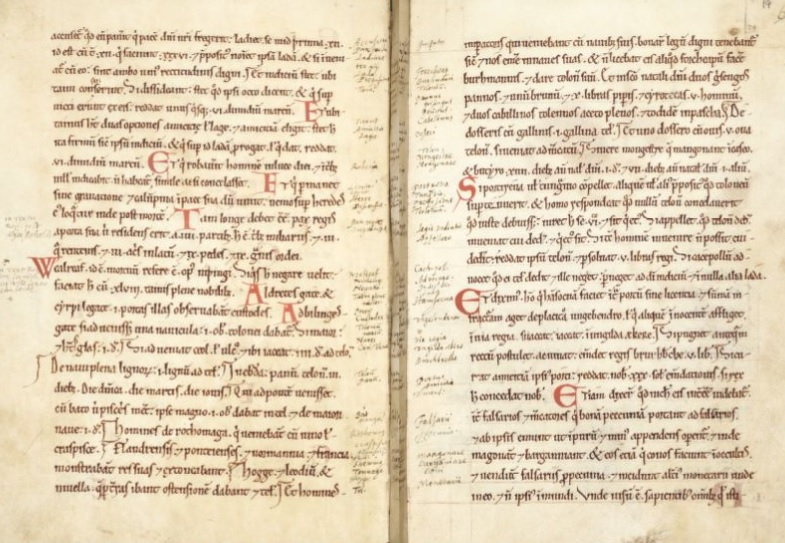
- Ascribed to: Æthelred the Unready, king of England
- Language: Latin
- Date: Early twelfth century (final version)
- Manuscript(s): Quadripartitus: London, British Library, MS Additional 49366, fos. 77v-78r; Manchester, John Rylands University Library, MS Lat. 420, fos. 63v-64r; London, British Library, MS Royal 11 B.II, fos. 157v-158v; London, British Library, MS Cotton Titus A.XXVII, fos. 142r-142v
- Genre: law code / legal learning
- Period covered: Tenth & eleventh centuries

The Laws of London, otherwise known as IV Æthelred (abbreviated IV Atr), De institutis Lundonie, the Institutes of London or the London Code, is a medieval English legal text. Traditionally, it was assigned to the reign of King Æthelred the Unready (978–1016), but may represent a compilation of a later date, finalised as much as a century later. The work provides an important window into, among other topics, the nature of commercial exchange, and international contact in London in the 10th and 11th centuries.

== Provenance ==
Its surviving form is written in Latin and is fully extant only in the manuscripts of Quadripartitus, a twelfth-century legal compilation. Legal historian Patrick Wormald noted that in the manuscript it is presented as an "extension of III [Æthelred]" along with tracts on Pax ("peace") and Walreaf ("corpse robbery"). It has been called a "hybrid" and a "composite text". In the 19th century, it was editorially divided into nine "chapters" and categorised as the fourth set of statutes surviving from the reign of King Æthelred the Unready, but in recent years it has been interpreted as representing two different underlying legal sources, with distinct subject matters.

The first conjectured underlying source is a "statement of London customs", one that sets out the trading rights of various foreign merchants and other city regulations. This has been labelled IV Æthelred A, abbreviated IV Atr A. Historian Rory Naismith argued that this section was likely developed between 1066 and 1100. The second underlying source appears to consist of a series of regulations relating to currency and minting, labelled IV Æthelred B, abbreviated IV Atr B. Naismith thought that this text dated to the tenth century, either to the first half of the reign of Æthelred the Unready, or perhaps the earlier reign of Edgar the Peacemaker (959–75).

== Content and significance ==
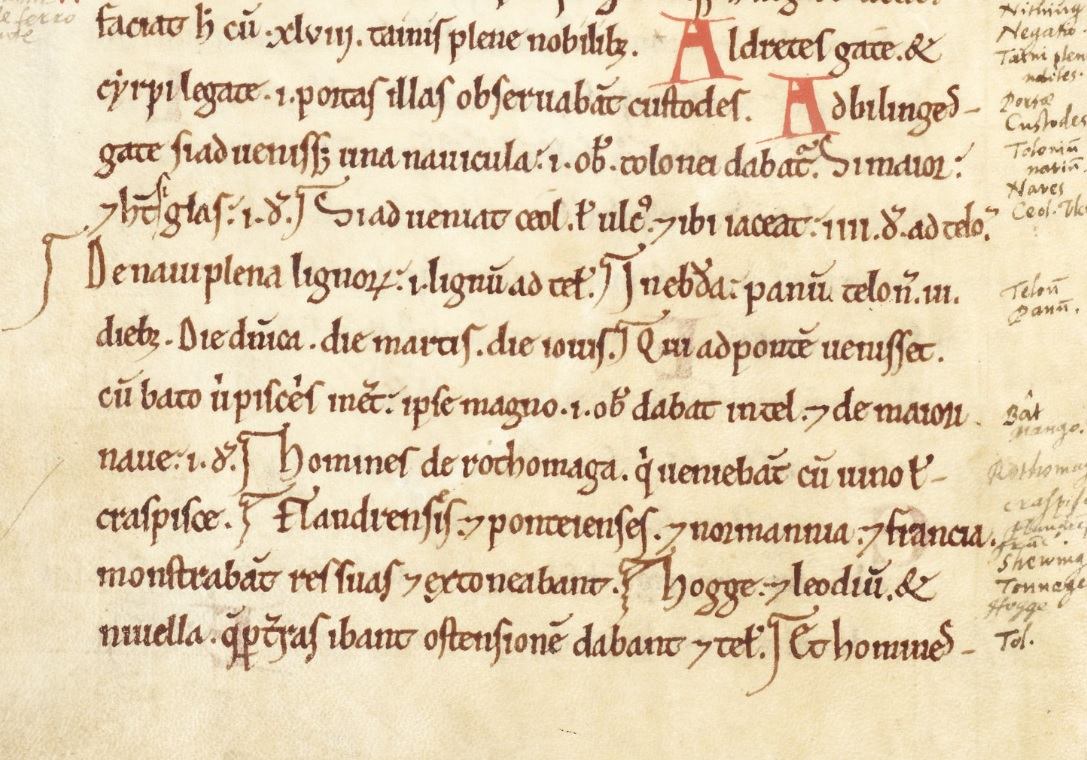
Opening lines of IV Atr B in the Manchester manuscript of Quadripartitus.

=== IV Æthelred A ===
Provisions	Description.
1	On the gates called Aldersgate and Cripplegate
2	Tolls for fishermen & foreign merchants (men of Rouen, Flanders, Ponthieu, Normandy, France, from Huy, Liège, Nivelles, and the (German) Empire); on wool, melted fat, livestock, cloth, poultry products, pepper, vinegar, dairy
3	On the withholding of tolls
4	On violent home invasion (hamsocn) and assault on the king's road

The provisions in IV Æthelred A are of great importance for understanding the early commerce of London, comparable with Continental sources like Raffelstetten customs regulations for tolls on the River Danube. The text is a key early source of information about trade between London and the Continent, and indicates that the subjects of the German Empire enjoyed special trading privileges in London.

Historian John Hudson has used the text as evidence that commercial exchange took place on Sunday, pointing to the provision 2.3 on wool tolls, which were collected on Sundays as well as Tuesdays and Thursdays. This is despite evidence that Sunday trade was often forbidden. Provision 4, decreeing capital punishment for "those who killed the innocent on the king's road", may represent according to Hudson "the most serious form of the offence known as forsteal." This provision is also notable in prescribing unconsecrated burial for forsteal (committing violence against a person on a road trying to proceed peacefully), as well as for the wrongs of hamsocn (committing violence against a person during a home invasion) and possibly mundbryce (committing a breach of some protection guarantee).

The text provides the earliest detail of several important London place-names. Wormald thought that the underlying source may have been larger than the extant version, perhaps used also in other codes like the ordinances of Cnut the Great.

=== IV Æthelred B ===
Provisions	Description.
5	On coinage
6	On the legal tender of royal coinage
7	On counterfeit and defective coinage from outside London
8	Instruction from the king to be on guard against counterfeit and defective coinage
9	Instruction to reduce the number of moneyers (three per 'major port', summus portus, and one for other 'ports') and their standards of practice

Historian Rory Naismith described this part of the textual tradition as a "series of tenth-century decrees on currency crimes" and "the most detailed statement on this topic to survive from Anglo-Saxon England". He also described it as "the most detailed single statement about the legal aspects of the English monetary system from before the later twelfth century".

The text is key in showing the roles and duties of royal officials (such as reeves and ealdormen) in protecting the coinage and preventing the spread of poor quality coins. Patrick Wormald noted that the laws seem to have been devised by the townsmen themselves, though accepted by the king and subsequently presented as royal ordinance. Another historian, Ann Williams, thought that might have been part of a larger body of legislation. Williams also thought that the effectiveness of the legislation was borne out "by the testimony of surviving coins".
