= Law codes of Cnut =

Codes of law issued by King Cnut of England

King Cnut of England issued two complementary law-codes during his reign (1016–1035), though they are believed to have been edited or even composed by Wulfstan, Archbishop of York. They were composed in Old English and are divided into two parts, I Cnut (on ecclesiastical matters) and II Cnut (on secular matters). As well as surviving in a later Latin translation as the Instituta Cnuti, the laws of Cnut survive in four manuscripts:

- London, British Library, Cotton Nero A. i, fols. 3–41 (mid-eleventh century)
- Cambridge, Corpus Christi College 201, fols. 126–30 (mid-eleventh century)
- Cambridge, Corpus Christi College 383, pp. 43–72 (twelfth-century)
- London, British Library Harley 55, fols. 5–13 (twelfth-century).

== See also ==
- Canons of Edgar
