= Battle of Edington =

878 battle between Wessex and Vikings

- Part of the Viking invasions of England
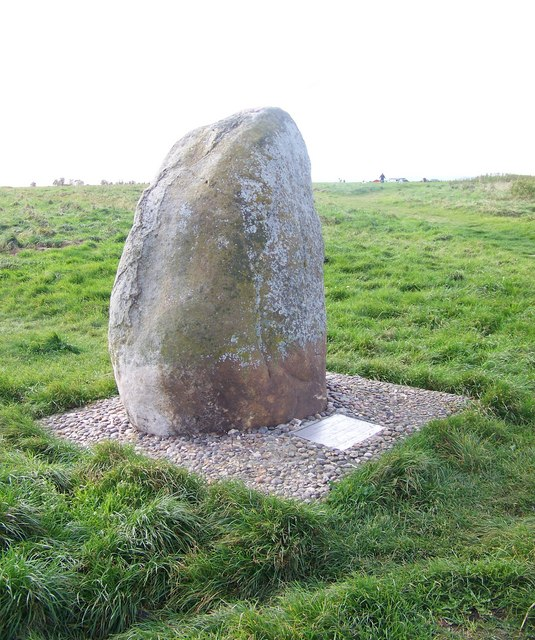
- Memorial to the Battle of Ethandun erected in 2000 near the hillfort of Bratton Castle with a plaque (Note: The memorial plaque says: To commemorate the Battle of Ethandun fought in this vicinity May 878 AD when King Alfred the Great defeated the Viking army, giving birth to the English nationalism. Unveiled by the 7th Marquess of Bath 5th November 2000. An additional inscription reads: This stone, presented by F. Swanton and sons, North Farm, West Overton, is a Sarsen Stone similar to those at Kingstom Deverill, the area where King Alfred rallied Saxon levies from Hampshire, Wiltshire and Somerset to march against Guthrum's Viking army based in Chippenham.)
Date	May 878
Location	Probably Edington, Wiltshire, see § Location of the battle. 51°15′50″N 02°08′34″W
Result	Saxon victory: Treaty of Wedmore

Belligerents
Wessex	Great Heathen Army

Commanders and leaders
Alfred the Great	Guthrum

Strength
2,000–6,000	~4,000

Casualties and losses
Unknown	Unknown, presumed heavy
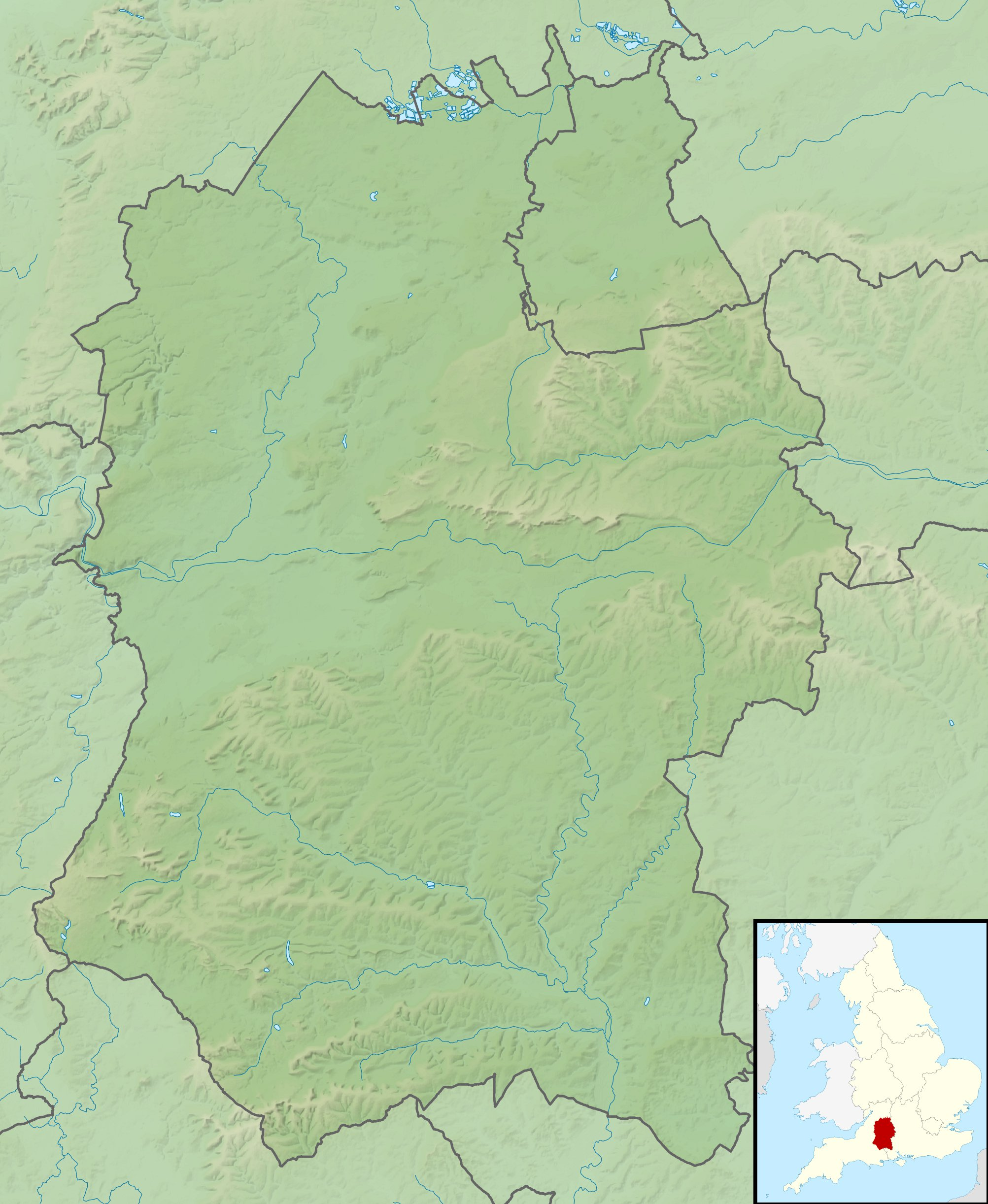
- Edington Battle of Edington (England)

The Battle of Edington or Battle of Ethandun (Note: Until a scholarly consensus linked the battle site with the present-day village of Edington in Wiltshire, it was primarily known as the Battle of Ethandun. Despite this, it still continues to be used. Primary sources locate the battle at "Eðandun".) was fought in May 878 between the West Saxon army of King Alfred the Great and the Great Heathen Army led by the Danish warlord Guthrum. The battle took place near Edington in Wiltshire, where Alfred secured a decisive victory that halted the Viking advance into Wessex.

The engagement followed a period of sustained Danish incursions into Anglo-Saxon territory. In early 878, Guthrum launched a surprise attack on Chippenham, forcing Alfred into hiding in the marshes of Athelney. After rallying local forces, Alfred confronted and defeated Guthrum at Edington, then laid siege to the Viking position, compelling their surrender.

Following the battle, Guthrum agreed to terms that included his baptism, withdrawal to East Anglia, and the establishment of peace through the Treaty of Wedmore. The outcome preserved Wessex as an independent kingdom and marked a turning point in the Viking wars, laying foundations for the eventual unification of England.

== Background ==
The first Viking raid on Anglo-Saxon England is thought to have occurred between 786 and 802 at Portland in the Kingdom of Wessex, when three Norse ships arrived; their men killed King Beorhtric's reeve. The Peterborough Chronicle says the year of the raid was 789. At the other end of the country, in the Kingdom of Northumbria, the island of Lindisfarne was raided in 793.

From the Anglo-Saxon Chronicle about the Viking raid on Lindisfarne:

This year dire forwarnings came over the land of the Northhumbrians, and miserably terrified the people; these were excessive whirlwinds, and lightnings; and fiery dragons were seen flying in the air. A great famine soon followed these tokens; and a little after that, in the same year, on the 6th before the Ides of January, the ravaging of heathen men lamentably destroyed God's church at Lindisfarne through rapine and slaughter.

After the sacking of Lindisfarne, Viking raids around the coasts were somewhat sporadic until the 830s, when the attacks became more sustained. In 835, "heathen men" ravaged Sheppey. In 836, King Ecgberht of Wessex was defeated at Carhampton, but in 838 he conquered a combined force of Vikings and Cornishmen at the Battle of Hingston Down in Cornwall.

The raiding continued and with each year became more intense. In 865–866 it escalated further with the arrival of what the Saxons called the Great Heathen Army. The annals do not report the size of the army, but modern estimates suggest between five hundred and a thousand men. It was said to have been under the leadership of the brothers Ivar the Boneless, Ubba, and Halfdan Ragnarsson. What made this army different from those before it was the intent of the leaders. These forces began "a new stage, that of conquest and residence". By 870, the Northmen had conquered the kingdoms of Northumbria and East Anglia, and in 871 they attacked Wessex. Of the nine battles during 871 mentioned by the Anglo-Saxon Chronicle, only one was a West Saxon victory, the Battle of Ashdown. The victory did not halt Viking raids in Britain. Alfred succeeded his brother Æthelred, who died after the Battle of Meretun.

Halfdan went back to Northumbria and fought the Picts and the Strathclyde Welsh to secure his northern kingdom. His army settled there, and he is not mentioned after 876, when "[the Danes] were engaged in ploughing and making a living for themselves". Guthrum, with two other unnamed kings, "departed for Cambridge in East Anglia".

=== Prelude ===
Guthrum and his men had adopted the usual Danish strategy of occupying a fortified town and waiting for a peace treaty, involving money in return for a promise to leave the kingdom immediately. Alfred shadowed the army, trying to prevent more damage than had already occurred. This started in 875 when Guthrum's army "eluded the West Saxon levies and got into Wareham". They then gave hostages and oaths to leave the country to Alfred, who paid them off.

The Danes promptly slipped off to Exeter, even deeper into Alfred's kingdom, where they concluded in the autumn of 877 a "firm peace" with Alfred, under terms that entailed their leaving his kingdom and not returning. This they did, spending the rest of 877 (by the Gregorian calendar) in Gloucester (in the kingdom of Mercia). Alfred spent Christmas at Chippenham (in Wessex), thirty miles (48 km) from Gloucester. The Danes attacked Chippenham "in midwinter after Twelfth Night", which was probably during the night of 6/7 Jan 878. They captured Chippenham and forced Alfred to retreat "with a small force" into the Somerset marsh of Athelney, protected by the natural defences of the country.

== Battle ==
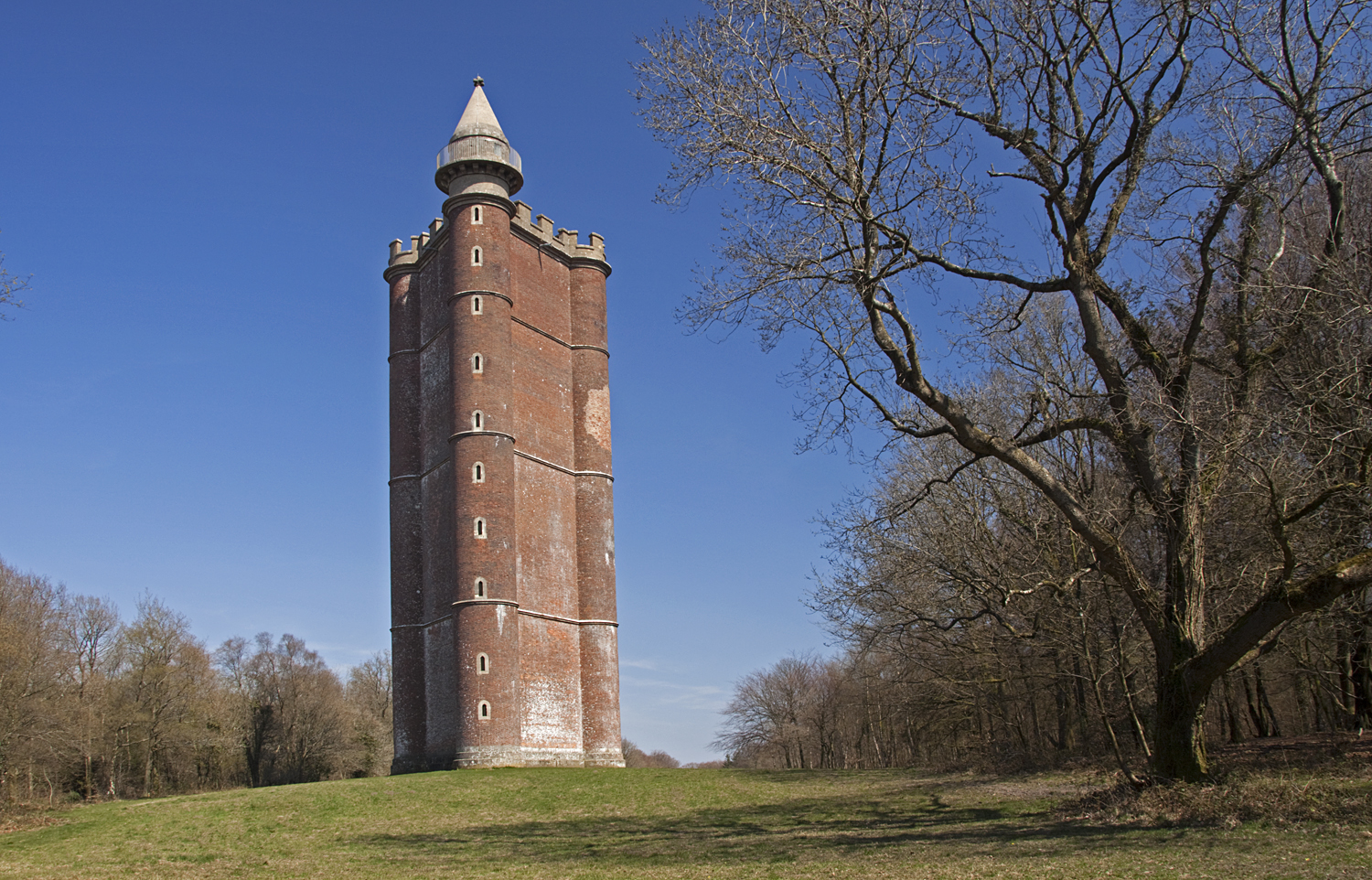
King Alfred's Tower is one supposed site of Egbert's Stone, the mustering place before the battle.

With his small warband, a fraction of his army at Chippenham, Alfred could not hope to retake the town from the Danes, who had in previous battles (for example at the Battle of Reading in 871) proved themselves adept at defending fortified positions. After the disaster at Chippenham, Alfred is next recorded around Easter 878, when he built a fortress at Athelney. In the seventh week after Easter, or between 4–7 May 878, Alfred called a levy at Ecgbryhtesstan (Egbert's Stone). Many of the men in the counties around (Somerset, Wiltshire, and Hampshire) who had not already fled rallied to him there. The next day, Alfred's host moved to Iley Oak, which Guthrum had camped about 7 miles (11 km) away. The day after that, Alfred continued on to Eðandun, where they fought the Danes.

According to the Life of King Alfred:

... Alfred arrived with his army at Edington in Wiltshire, and there he fought against the Vikings and put them to flight. He pursued the enemy as far as its stronghold.

After the victory, when the Danes had taken refuge in the fortress, the West Saxons besieged the fort, and waited for two weeks. The Danes sued for peace and gave Alfred hostages and solemn oaths that they would leave the kingdom, and promised that Guthrum would be baptized. The primary difference between this agreement and the treaties at Wareham and Exeter was that Alfred had decisively defeated the Danes at Edington, rather than just stopping them, and therefore it seemed more likely that they would keep to the terms of the treaty.

One reason for Alfred's victory was possibly the relative size of the two armies. The men of even one shire could be a formidable fighting force, as those of Devon proved in the same year, defeating an army under Ubba at the Battle of Cynwit. In 875 Guthrum had lost the support of other Danish lords, including Ivar the Boneless and Ubba. Further Danish forces had settled on the land before Guthrum attacked Wessex: in East Anglia and in Mercia between the treaty at Exeter and the attack on Chippenham; many others were lost in a storm off Swanage in 876–877, with 120 ships wrecked. Some historians, such as Richard Abels, have suggested that Guthrum's defeat at Edington may have reflected not only military failure but also diminishing internal cohesion.

== Location of the battle ==
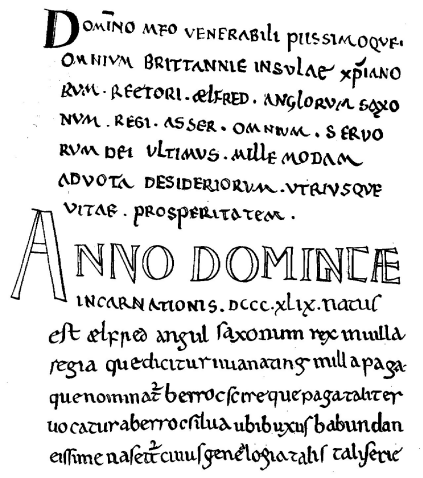
A 1722 copy of part of Asser's Life of King Alfred

The primary sources for the location of the battle are Asser's Life of King Alfred, which names the place as "Ethandun" and the Anglo-Saxon Chronicle, which has Eðandun. The chronicle was compiled during the reign of Alfred the Great and is thus a contemporary record. It is believed that Asser's Life was originally written in 893; however, no contemporary manuscript survives. A version of the Life, written in about 1000 and known as the Cotton Otho A. xii text, lasted until 1731, when it was destroyed in the fire at Ashburnham House. Before its destruction, this version had been transcribed and annotated; it is this transcription on which modern translations are based. Some scholars have suggested that Asser's Life of King Alfred was a forgery. (Note: See Gransden 1996, pp. Ch. 4 for an analysis of the subject.)

The location of the battle accepted by most present-day historians is at Edington, near Westbury in Wiltshire. However, the location has been much debated over the centuries. In 1904, William Henry Stevenson disputed the location and said "So far, there is nothing to prove the identity of this Eðandun [as named in the Anglo-Saxon Chronicle] with Edington" but then goes on to say that "there can be little reason for questioning it".

The reasoning to support the Eðandun of the Anglo-Saxon Chronicle and the Ethandun of Asser's Life being Edington in Wiltshire is derived from the primary sources, including Asser's Life of King Alfred. Edington, Wiltshire, is known to have been part of Alfred's family estate. He left a manor called Eðandun to his wife in his will. A charter records a meeting of the king's council at Eðandun, although a later scribe has annotated the same document with Eðandune.

Alternatives to Edington, Wiltshire, have been suggested since early times. The Tudor historian Polydore Vergil appears to have misread the ancient texts for the battle site, as he places it at Abyndoniam (Abingdon). In the 19th century there was a resurgence in interest of medieval history and King Alfred was seen as a major hero. Although most early historians had sited the battle as in the Edington area, the significant interest in the subject encouraged many antiquarians to dig up Alfredian sites and also to propose alternatives for the location of the battle. Arguments for the alternative sites were generally name-based, although with the large interest in everything Alfredian in the 19th century, any site that had an Alfredian connection could be guaranteed large numbers of tourists, so this was also a driving force to find a link.

In 1913, Charles Whistler and Albany Major argued for Edington Hill in the Polden Hills. They quote Asser and the Anglo-Saxon Chronicle as reporting that the men of three counties rode to meet Alfred at Ecbryht’s Stone "in the eastern part of the wood called Selwood", and that the next day his forces marched to Iglea or Aecglea, and the next morning a further nine miles on to Ethandun. They say it is clear from the Chronicle that this was "within striking distance of Athelney." They also consider that after Guthrum had lost the battle, the geography of the Edington Hill site would make his position in a two-week siege hopeless, leading to his surrender, whereas "It is one of the unanswerable difficulties involved in the acceptance of a Wiltshire site that no help came from the Mercian Danes across the Thames."

In 1939, Illtyd Trethowan also sought to make the case for Edington, Somerset, relying on military arguments and the record of the baptism of Guthrum after the battle at nearby Aller.

== Consequences ==
England, before the Battle of Edington.

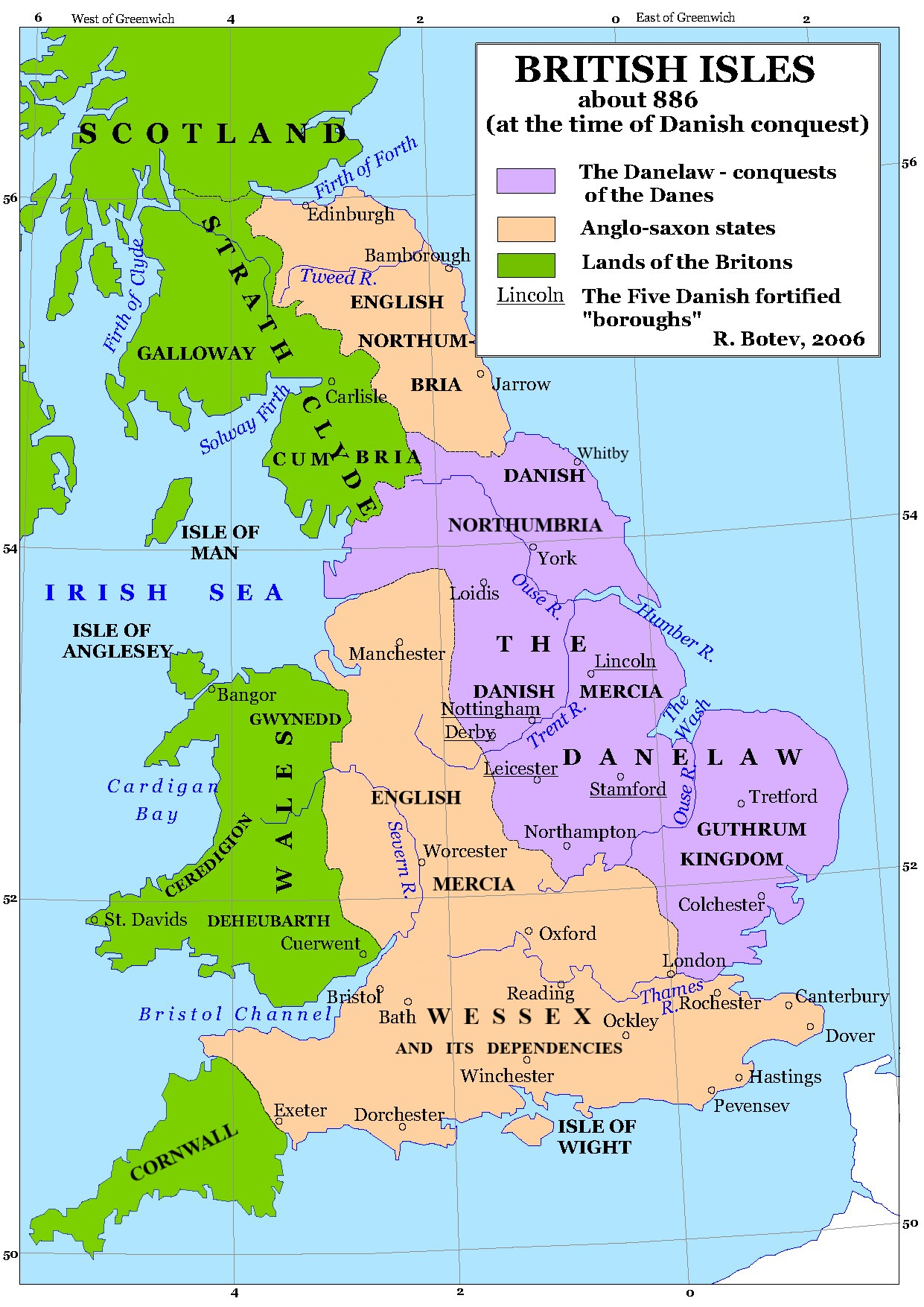
England, after the Battle of Edington and the Treaty of Wedmore, in 886.

Three weeks after the battle, Guthrum was baptised at Aller in Somerset with Alfred as his sponsor. It is possible that the enforced conversion was an attempt by Alfred to lock Guthrum into a Christian code of ethics, hoping it would ensure the Danes' compliance with any treaties agreed to. The converted Guthrum took the baptismal name of Athelstan, the name of Alfred's deceased older brother.

Under the terms of the Treaty of Wedmore, the converted Guthrum was required to leave Wessex and return to East Anglia. Consequently, in 879 the Viking army left Chippenham and made its way to Cirencester (in the Kingdom of Mercia) and remained there for a year. The following year the army went to East Anglia, where it settled, which started Viking activity in East Anglia. This allowed Alfred the Great to stabilise Wessex and reform administration and defence. This includes the establishment of fortified towns (burhs) and reorganisation of the fyrd (militia system).

A map of burhs in the 10th-century. Burhs were established after the Treaty of Wedmore, for Alfred the Great to reestablish the militia system of Wessex.

Also in 879, according to Asser, another Viking army sailed up the River Thames and wintered at Fulham in Middlesex. Over the next few years this particular Danish faction had several encounters with Alfred's forces.

In 885 Asser reports that the Viking army that had settled in East Anglia had broken in a 'most insolent manner' the peace they had established with Alfred, although Guthrum is not mentioned. Guthrum reigned as king in East Anglia until his death in 890, and although this period was not always peaceful he was not considered a threat. Sometime after Wedmore and before Guthrum's death, a treaty was agreed that set out the lasting peace terms between the two kings. It is known as the Treaty of Alfred and Guthrum and defines the boundaries of their two kingdoms. The kingdom of Mercia was divided up, with part going to Alfred's Wessex and the other part to Guthrum's East Anglia. The agreement also defined the social classes of Danish East Anglia and their equivalents in Wessex. It tried to provide a framework that would minimise conflict and regulate commerce between the two peoples. It is not clear how seriously Guthrum took his conversion to Christianity, but he was the first of the Danish rulers of the English kingdoms to mint coins on the Alfredian model, under his baptismal name of Athelstan. By the end of the 9th century, all of the Anglo-Danish rulers were minting coins too. By the 10th century, the Anglo-Saxon model of kingship seems to have been universally adopted by the Anglo-Danish leadership.

After the defeat of Guthrum at the Battle of Edington, Alfred's reforms to military obligations in Wessex made it increasingly difficult for the Vikings to raid successfully. By 896 the Vikings had given up, with some going to East Anglia and others to Northumbria. It was under Alfred that the Viking threat was contained. However, the system of military reforms and the Burghal Hidage introduced by Edward the Elder enabled Alfred's successors to retake control of the lands occupied in the North of England by the Danes.

== Sources ==
- Abels, Richard (1998). Alfred the Great: War, Kingship and Culture in Anglo-Saxon England. Abingdon, Oxon: Routledge. ISBN 978-1-13883-654-9.
- Bennett, Stephen (2013). "The Wyvern Resurgent: Alfred's Campaign of 878 and the Battle of Edington". Medieval Warfare. 3 (5): 26–32. JSTOR 48578275 – via JSTOR.
- Blunt, Christopher Evelyn; Stewart, Bruce Henry Ian Howard; Lyon, Charles Stephen Sinclair (1989). Coinage in Tenth-Century England. Oxford University Press. ISBN 978-0-52103-177-6.
- Downham, Clare (2007). Viking Kings of Britain and Ireland: The Dynasty of Ívarr to A.D. 1014. Dunedin Academic Press. ISBN 978-1-903765-89-0.
- Gransden, Antonia (1996). Historical Writing in England: c. 500 to c. 1307. London: Routledge. ISBN 978-0-41515-124-5.
- Jones, Gwyn (1984). A History of the Vikings. Oxford: Oxford University Press. ISBN 978-0-19215-882-6.
- Keynes, Simon (2001). "The Vikings in England c. 790-1016". In Sawyer, Peter (ed.). The Oxford Illustrated History of the Vikings (3rd ed.). Oxford: OUP. pp. 48–82. ISBN 978-0-19285-434-6.
- Keynes, Simon; Lapidge, Michael, eds. (1983). Alfred the Great: Asser's Life of King Alfred & Other Contemporary Sources. London: Penguin Classics. ISBN 978-0-14044-409-4 – via Internet Archive.
- Lavelle, Ryan (2010). Alfred's Wars Sources and Interpretations of Anglo-Saxon Warfare in the Viking Age. Woodbridge, Suffolk: Boydell Press. ISBN 978-1-84383-569-1.
- Parker, Joanne (2007). 'England's Darling'. Manchester: Manchester University Press. ISBN 978-0-71907-356-4.
- Stevenson, William, ed. (1904). Asser's Life of King Alfred (in Latin and English). Oxford, UK: Clarendon Press. OCLC 1354216.
- Swanton, Michael, ed. (2000). The Anglo-Saxon Chronicles (revised paperback ed.). London, UK: Phoenix. ISBN 978-1-84212-003-3 – via Internet Archive.
- "Battle of Ethandun". United Kingdom National Inventory of War Memorials. Archived from the original on 6 June 2010.
- Wood, Michael (2005). In Search of the Dark Ages. London: BBC. ISBN 978-0-56352-276-8.
- Whitelock, Dorothy (1979). English Historical Documents. Vol. 1 (2nd ed.). London: Routledge. ISBN 978-0-415-14366-0.
- Yorke, Barbara (1997). Kings and Kingdoms of Anglo-Saxon England. London: Routledge. ISBN 978-0-41516-639-3.
