= Instituta Cnuti =

The Instituta Cnuti, in full Instituta Cnuti aliorumque regum Anglorum (Institutes of Cnut and other kings of the English), is a legal compilation that cites, in Latin translation, selected material of Old English law. It was put together by an Anglo-Norman cleric, possibly at Worcester, sometime after the Conquest, between 1066 and 1124.

== Contents ==
The work consists of three sections. The first two contain passages from Cnut's two law codes (I Cnut and II Cnut), occasionally with amendments by the compiler to suit contemporary circumstances. The last section has material excerpted from the laws of Ine, Alfred, and Edgar (II Edgar), as well as unofficial legal tracts associated with Wulfstan, Archbishop of York, like Geþyncðu. The selection shows that the translator took particular interest in (secular) Danelaw.

The Instituta may be compared to the Consiliatio Cnuti, which offers a near-complete Latin translation of Cnut's legislation.

== Manuscripts ==
The text is preserved in Rochester Cathedral Library A. 3. 5 (the Textus Roffensis) and six later manuscripts dating from the 12th and early 13th centuries, including:

- London, British Library Cotton Titus A.27
- Paris, Bibliothèque Nationale, Colbert 3,860
- Oxford, Bodeian Library, Rawlinson C. 641

== Editions and translations ==
The standard edition is still that of Felix Liebermann in his monumental Gesetze der Angelsachsen. More recently, Bruce O'Brien has criticised Liebermann's work and suggested the need for a new critical edition.
