= Felix Liebermann =

Jewish German historian (1851–1925)

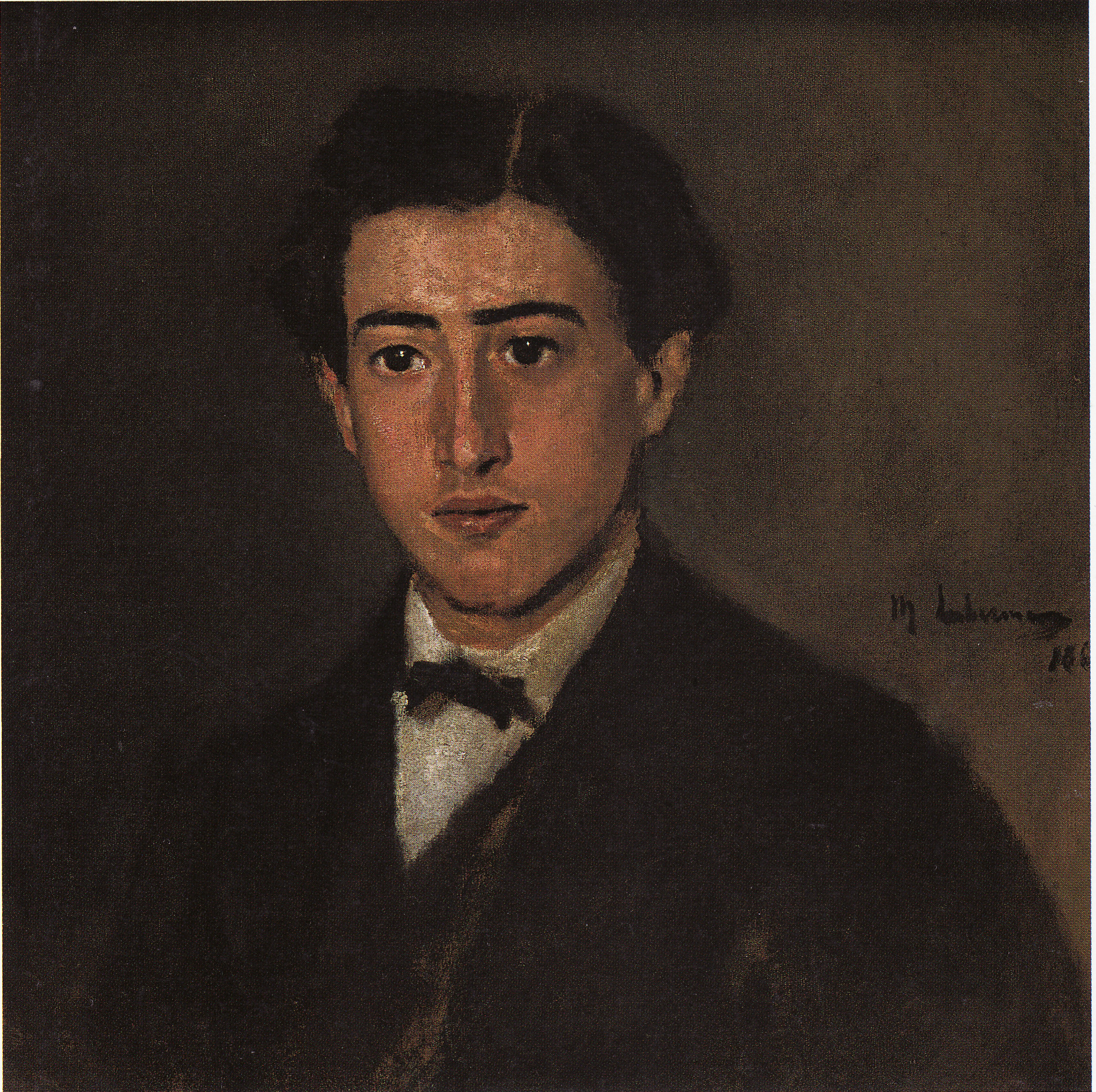
Felix Liebermann

Felix Liebermann (20 July 1851 – 7 October 1925) was a German historian, and is celebrated for his scholarly contributions to the study of medieval English history, particularly that of Anglo-Saxon and Anglo-Norman law.

== Life ==
Felix Liebermann was born in 1851 in Berlin, then the capital of Prussia. He came from a Jewish-German family; his older brother was the painter Max Liebermann. Felix first pursued a career in banking and the textile industry, living for a time in Manchester, England. In 1873, he moved to Göttingen, Germany, to study early English history. Georg Waitz and Reinhold Pauli became his mentors. After his promotion in 1875 on the "Dialogue of the Exchequer" (Dialogus de Scaccario), he rapidly earned a name for himself as a medievalist with a special focus on England. He served as an editor with the Monumenta Germaniae Historica from 1877–1885. In 1896, he received honorary degrees from the universities of Oxford and Cambridge and later, the title of professor of history from the Prussian minister of justice Robert Bosse. He died in a car accident in Berlin in 1925.

== Works ==
- 1875. Dialogus de Scaccario. Dissertation.
- 1879. Ungedruckte anglo-normannische Geschichtsquellen. Strasbourg.
- Monumenta Germaniae Historica... [Historical Monuments of Germany...], Scriptorum, Vol. XXVIII: Ex Rerum Anglicarum Scriptoribus Saeculi XIII. [Authors, Vol. XXVIII: Excerpts from English Authors of the 13th Century] (in Latin), Hanover: Hahn, 1888.
- 1889. Die Heiligen Englands: Angelsächsisch und lateinisch. Available from Google Books
- 1892. Quadripartitus. Ein englisches Rechtsbuch von 1114. Halle. PDF available from Google Books, here and here (US only) and from the Internet Archive here
- 1893. Consiliatio Cnuti. Eine Übertragung angelsächsischer Gesetze aus dem zwölften Jahrhundert. Halle.
- 1894. Über Pseudo-Cnuts Constitutiones de foresta. Halle.
- 1894. Über die Leges Anglorum saeculo XIII, ineunte Londoniis collectae. Halle.
- 1896. Über die Leges Edwardi Confessoris. Halle.
- 1901. Über das englische rechtsbuch Leges Henrici. PDF available from the Internet Archive
- 1903-1916. Gesetze der Angelsachsen. 3 vols. Halle. Standard edition, translation, dictionary and glossary of the corpus of Anglo-Saxon laws. Available from the Internet Archive:
  - vol. 1 (edition and translation)
  - vol. 2. Or separately, first half (dictionary) and second half (glossary)
  - vol. 3 (commentary)
- 1913. The national assembly in the Anglo-Saxon period. Halle. Internet Archive
