= Danelaw =

Part of England where Danish law applied

Coordinates: 54°N 1°W

Danelaw Dena lagu (Old English)
- Between 878 and 890–1066
- England, 886
- Common languages: Old Norse; Old English
- Religion: Christianity
- History
  - Treaty of Alfred and Guthrum: Between 878 and 890
  - Norman Conquest: 1066
- Today part of: England

The Danelaw (/ˈdeɪnˌlɔː/, Danish: Danelagen; Norwegian: Danelagen; Old English: Dena lagu) was the part of England between the late ninth century and the Norman Conquest under Anglo-Saxon rule in which Danish laws applied. The Danelaw originated in the conquest and occupation of large parts of eastern and northern England by Danish Vikings in the late ninth century. The term applies to the areas in which English kings allowed the Danes to keep their own laws following the early tenth-century Anglo-Saxon conquest of Danish-ruled eastern and northern England in return for the Danish settlers' loyalty to the English crown. "Danelaw" is first recorded in the early 11th century as Dena lage.

The Danelaw originated from the invasion of the Great Heathen Army into England in 865, but the term was not used to describe a geographic area until the 11th century. With the increase in population and productivity in Scandinavia, Viking warriors, having sought treasure and glory in the nearby British Isles, "proceeded to plough and support themselves", in the words of the Anglo-Saxon Chronicle for 876.

Danelaw can describe the set of legal terms and definitions created in the treaties between Alfred the Great, the king of Wessex, and Guthrum, the Danish warlord, written following Guthrum's defeat at the Battle of Edington in 878, starting with the Treaty of Wedmore.

Between the aftermath of the Treaty of Wedmore (Note: The actual date of the Treaty is not known. The treaty of Alfred and Guthrum ascribes Viking-held London to Alfred, so some historians have suggested that the treaty would not have been finalised until Alfred reoccupied the city in 886. However the Anglo-Saxon Chronicle for 885 says that "... the army from East-Anglia broke their peace with Alfred", which might indicate that the treaty had been signed earlier.) and Guthrum's death in 890, the Treaty of Alfred and Guthrum was formalised, defining the boundaries of their kingdoms, with provisions for peaceful relations between the Danes and the Anglo-Saxons, including allowing the self-governance of the Danes in exchange of loyalty to England. The language spoken in England was affected by this clash of cultures, with the emergence of Anglo-Norse dialects.

The Danelaw approximately covered Yorkshire, the central and eastern Midlands, and the East of England.

== Background ==
=== Scandinavian York ===
From around 800, there had been waves of Norse raids on the coastlines of Britain and Ireland. In 865, instead of raiding, the Danes landed a large army in East Anglia, with the intention of conquering the four Anglo-Saxon kingdoms of England. The armies of various Danish leaders had collaborated to make one combined force under a leadership that included Halfdan Ragnarsson and Ivar the Boneless, the sons of the legendary Viking leader Ragnar Lodbrok. The combined army was described in the annals as the Great Heathen Army. In 867 they captured Northumbria and its capital, York ("Jórvík"), defeating both the recently deposed King Osberht of Northumbria and the usurper Ælla of Northumbria. The Danes then placed an Englishman, Ecgberht I of Northumbria, on the throne of Northumbria as a puppet ruler.

King Æthelred of Wessex and his brother, Alfred, led their army against the Danes at Nottingham, but the Danes refused to leave their fortifications. King Burgred of Mercia negotiated peace with Ivar, with the Danes keeping Nottingham in exchange for leaving the rest of Mercia alone.

Under Ivar the Boneless, the Danes continued their invasion in 869 by defeating King Edmund of East Anglia at Hoxne and conquering the Kingdom of East Anglia. Once again, the brothers Æthelred and Alfred attempted to stop Ivar by attacking the Danes at Reading. They were repelled with heavy losses. The Danes pursued, and on 7 January 871, Æthelred and Alfred defeated the Danes at the Battle of Ashdown. The Danes retreated to Basing (in Hampshire), where Æthelred attacked and was, in turn, defeated. Ivar was able to follow up this victory with another in March at Meretum (now Marton, Wiltshire).

On 23 April 871, King Æthelred died and Alfred succeeded him as King of Wessex. His army was weak and he was forced to pay tribute to Ivar in order to make peace with the Danes. During this peace, the Danes turned to the north and attacked Mercia, a campaign that lasted until 874. The Danish leader Ivar died during this campaign. Ivar was succeeded by Guthrum, who finished the campaign against Mercia. In ten years, the Danes had gained control over East Anglia, Northumbria and Mercia, leaving just Wessex resisting.

Guthrum and the Danes brokered peace with Wessex in 876, when they captured the fortresses of Wareham and Exeter. Alfred laid siege to the Danes, who were forced to surrender after reinforcements were lost in a storm. Two years later, Guthrum again attacked Alfred, surprising him by attacking his forces wintering in Chippenham. King Alfred was saved when the Danish army coming from his rear was destroyed by inferior forces at the Battle of Cynuit. The modern location of Cynuit is disputed but suggestions include Countisbury Hill, near Lynmouth, Devon, or Kenwith Castle, Bideford, Devon, or Cannington, near Bridgwater, Somerset. Alfred was forced into hiding for a time, before returning in early 878 to gather an army and attack Guthrum at Edington. The Danes were defeated and retreated to Chippenham, where King Alfred laid siege and soon forced them to surrender. As a term of surrender, King Alfred demanded that Guthrum be baptised a Christian; King Alfred served as his godfather.

Edward the Elder and his sister, Æthelflæd, the Lady of the Mercians, conquered Danish territories in the Midlands and East Anglia in a series of campaigns in the 910s, and some Danish jarls who submitted were allowed to keep their lands. Viking rule ended when Eric Bloodaxe was driven out of Northumbria in 954.

The reasons for the waves of immigration were complex and bound to the political situation in Scandinavia at that time; they occurred when Viking settlers were also establishing their presence in the Hebrides, Isle of Man, Orkney, Shetland, Faroe Islands, Ireland, Iceland, Greenland, L'Anse aux Meadows, France (Normandy), the Baltics, Russia and Ukraine (see Kievan Rus').

== Cnut and his successors ==
Cnut the Great's domains

The Danes did not give up their designs on England. From 1016 to 1035, Cnut the Great ruled over a unified English kingdom, itself the product of a resurgent Wessex, as part of his North Sea Empire, together with Denmark, Norway and part of Sweden. Cnut was succeeded in England on his death by his son Harold Harefoot, until he died in 1040, after which another of Cnut's sons, Harthacnut, took the throne. Since Harthacnut was already on the Danish throne, this reunited the North Sea Empire. Harthacnut lived only another two years, and from his death in 1042 until 1066 the monarchy reverted to the English line in the form of Edward the Confessor.

Edward died in January 1066 without an obvious successor, and an English nobleman, Harold Godwinson, took the throne. Later that year, two rival claimants to the throne led invasions of England in short succession. First, Harald Hardrada of Norway took York in September, but was defeated by Harold at the Battle of Stamford Bridge, in Yorkshire. Then, three weeks later, William of Normandy defeated Harold at the Battle of Hastings, in Sussex, and in December he accepted the submission of Edgar the Ætheling, last in the line of Anglo-Saxon royal succession, at Berkhamsted.

The Danelaw appeared in legislation as late as the early 12th century with the Leges Henrici Primi, where it is referred to as one of the laws together with those of Wessex and Mercia into which England was divided.

== Chronology ==
793 – Viking raid on Lindisfarne

800 – Waves of Danish assaults on the coastlines of the British Isles.

865 – Danish raiders first began to settle in England. Led by the brothers Halfdan and Ivar the Boneless, they wintered in East Anglia, where they demanded and received tribute in exchange for a temporary peace. From there, they moved north and attacked Northumbria, which was in the midst of a civil war between the deposed king Osberht and a usurper Ælla. The Danes used the civil turmoil as an opportunity to capture York, which they sacked and burned.

867 – Following the loss of York, Osberht and Ælla formed an alliance against the Danes. They launched a counter-attack, but the Danes killed both Osberht and Ælla and set up a puppet king on the Northumbrian throne. In response, King Æthelred of Wessex, along with his brother Alfred, marched against the Danes, who were positioned behind fortifications in Nottingham, but were unable to draw them into battle. In order to effect peace, King Burgred of Mercia ceded Nottingham to the Danes in exchange for leaving the rest of Mercia undisturbed.

868 – Danes captured Nottingham.

869 – Ivar the Boneless returned and demanded tribute from King Edmund of East Anglia.

870 – King Edmund refused Ivar's demand. Ivar defeated and captured Edmund at Hoxne, adding East Anglia to the area controlled by the invading Danes. King Æthelred and Alfred attacked the Danes at Reading, but were repulsed with heavy losses. The Danes pursued them.

871 – On 7 January, Æthelred and Alfred made their stand at Ashdown (on what is the Berkshire/North Wessex Downs now in Oxfordshire). Æthelred could not be found at the start of battle, as he was busy praying in his tent, so Alfred led the army into battle. Æthelred and Alfred defeated the Danes, who counted among their losses five jarls (nobles). The Danes retreated and set up fortifications at Basing (Basingstoke) in Hampshire, a mere 14 miles (23 km) from Reading. Æthelred attacked the Danish fortifications and was routed. The Danes followed up with another victory in March at Meretum (now Marton, Wiltshire).

King Æthelred died on 23 April 871 and Alfred took the throne of Wessex. For the rest of the year Alfred concentrated on attacking with small bands against isolated groups of Danes. He was moderately successful in this endeavour and was able to score minor victories against the Danes, but his army was on the verge of collapse. Alfred responded by paying off the Danes for a promise of peace. During the peace, the Danes turned north and attacked Mercia, which they finished off in short order, and captured London in the process. King Burgred of Mercia fought in vain against Ivar the Boneless and his Danish invaders for three years until 874, when he fled to Europe. During Ivar's campaign against Mercia, he died and was succeeded by Guthrum the Old. Guthrum quickly defeated Burgred and placed a puppet on the throne of Mercia. The Danes now controlled East Anglia, Northumbria and Mercia, with only Wessex continuing to resist.

875 – The Danes settled in Dorset, well inside Alfred's Kingdom of Wessex, but Alfred quickly made peace with them.

876 – The Danes broke the peace when they captured the fortress of Wareham, followed by a similar capture of Exeter in 877.

877 – Alfred laid in a siege, while the Danes waited for reinforcements from Scandinavia. Unfortunately for the Danes, the fleet of reinforcements encountered a storm and lost more than 100 ships, and the Danes were forced to return to East Mercia in the north.

878 – In January, Guthrum led an attack against Wessex that sought to capture Alfred while he wintered in Chippenham. Another Danish army landed in south Wales arrived and moved south with the intent of intercepting Alfred should he flee from Guthrum's forces. However, they stopped during their march to capture a small fortress at Countisbury Hill, held by a Wessex ealdorman named Odda. The Saxons, led by Odda, attacked the Danes while they slept and defeated their superior forces, saving Alfred from being trapped between the two armies. Alfred was forced to go into hiding for the rest of the winter and spring of 878 in the Somerset marshes in order to avoid the superior Danish forces. In the spring, Alfred was able to gather an army and attacked Guthrum and the Danes at Edington. The Danes were defeated and retreated to Chippenham, where the English pursued and laid siege to Guthrum's forces. The Danes were unable to hold out without relief and soon surrendered. Alfred demanded, as a term of the surrender, that Guthrum become baptised as a Christian, which Guthrum agreed to do, with Alfred acting as his godfather. Guthrum was true to his word and settled in East Anglia, at least for a while.

Between 886 and 890, – The Treaty of Alfred and Guthrum formally comes into action, establishing the boundaries of the Danelaw and allowed for Danish self-rule in the region.

902 – Essex submitted to Æthelwald.

903 – Æthelwald incited the East Anglian Danes into breaking the peace. They ravaged Mercia before winning a pyrrhic victory that saw the death of Æthelwald and the Danish King Eohric; this allowed Edward the Elder to consolidate power.

911 – The English defeated the Danes at the Battle of Tettenhall. The Northumbrians ravaged Mercia but were trapped by Edward and forced to fight.

917 – In return for peace and protection, the Kingdoms of Essex and East Anglia accepted Edward the Elder as their suzerain overlord.

Æthelflæd, Lady of the Mercians, took the borough of Derby.

918 – The borough of Leicester submitted peaceably to Æthelflæd's rule. The people of York promised to accept her as their overlord, but she died before this could come to fruition. She was succeeded by her brother, the Kingdoms of Mercia and Wessex united in the person of King Edward.

919 – Norwegian Vikings under King Ragnvald Sygtryggsson of Dublin took York.

920 – Edward was accepted as father and lord by the King of the Scots, by Rægnold, the sons of Eadulf, the English, Norwegians, Danes and others all of whom dwelt in Northumbria and the King and people of the Strathclyde Welsh.

954 – King Eric was driven out of Northumbria, his death marking the end of the prospect of a Northern Viking Kingdom stretching from York to Dublin and the Isles.

1002 – St. Brice's Day massacre of the Danes.

1016 to 1035 – Cnut the Great ruled over a unified English kingdom, as part of his North Sea Empire, together with Denmark, Norway and part of Sweden.

1066 – Harald Hardrada landed with an army, hoping to take control of York and the English crown. He was defeated and killed at the Battle of Stamford Bridge. This event is often cited as the end of the Viking era. The same year, William the Conqueror, himself a descendant of Vikings, successfully took the English throne and became the first Norman king of England.

1069 – Sweyn II of Denmark landed with an army, in much the same way as Harald Hardrada. He took control of York after defeating the Norman garrison and inciting a local uprising. King William eventually defeated his forces and devastated the region in the Harrying of the North.

1075 – One of Sweyn's sons, Cnut, set sail for England to support an English rebellion, but it had been crushed before he arrived, so he settled for plundering the city of York and the surrounding area before returning home.

1085 – Cnut, now king, assembled a fleet for a major invasion against England. Informed of his planned crossing, William hurried back to England to prepare a defence, but internal threats forced Cnut to cancel his plan. Other than Eystein II of Norway taking advantage of the civil war during Stephen's reign, to plunder the east coast of England, there were no serious invasions or raids of England by the Danes after this.

== Geography ==
The Five Boroughs and the English Midlands in the early 10th century

The area occupied by the Danelaw was roughly the area to the north of a line drawn between London and Chester, excluding the portion of Northumbria to the east of the Pennines.

Five fortified towns became particularly important in the Danelaw: Leicester, Nottingham, Derby, Stamford and Lincoln, broadly delineating the area now called the East Midlands. These strongholds became known as the Five Boroughs. Borough derives from the Old English word burh (cognate with German Burg, meaning castle), meaning a fortified and walled enclosure containing several households, anything from a large stockade to a fortified town. The meaning has since developed further.

== Legal concepts ==
The Danelaw was an important factor in the establishment of a civilian peace in the neighbouring Anglo-Saxon and Viking communities. It established, for example, equivalences in areas of legal contentiousness, such as the amount of reparation that should be payable in wergild.

Many of the legalistic concepts were compatible; for example, the Viking wapentake, the standard for land division in the Danelaw, was effectively interchangeable with the hundred. The use of the execution site and cemetery at Walkington Wold in east Yorkshire suggests a continuity of judicial practice.

Under the Danelaw, between 30% and 50% of the population in the countryside had the legal status of 'sokeman', occupying an intermediate position between the free tenants and the bond tenants. This tended to provide more autonomy for the peasants. A sokeman was a free man within the lord's soke, or jurisdiction.

According to many scholars, "the Danelaw was an especially 'free' area of Britain because the rank and file of the Danish armies, from whom sokemen were descended, had settled in the area and imported their own social system."

== Legacy ==
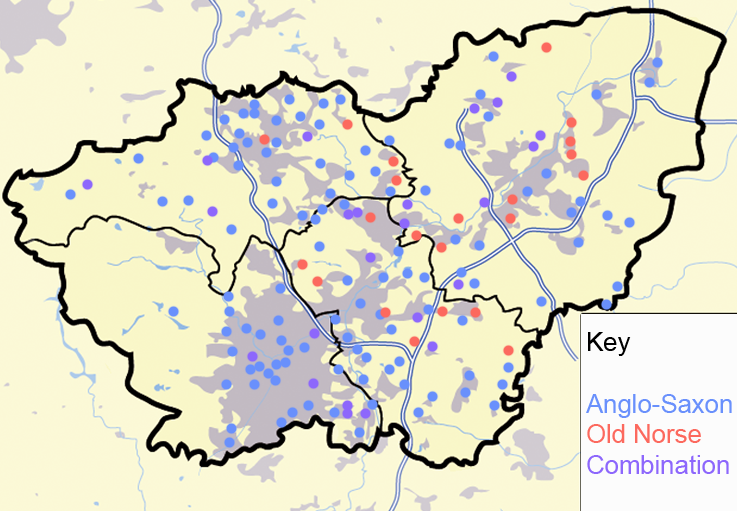
Toponymy within present day South Yorkshire, the former Kingdom of Jorvik, showing the lasting legacy of Danish settlement

The influence of this period of Scandinavian settlement can still be seen in the North of England and the East Midlands, and is particularly evident in place-names, endings such as -howe, -by (meaning "village") or -thorp ("hamlet") having Old Norse origins. There seems to be a remarkable number of Kirby/Kirkby names, thought to stem from Old Norse kirk ("church", compare Old English: cirice, cyrice for church) and -by ("village"), some with remains of Anglo-Saxon buildings, indicating both a Norse origin and early church building.

Old East Norse and Old English were still somewhat mutually comprehensible. The contact between these languages in the Danelaw caused the incorporation of many Norse words into the English language, including the word law itself, sky and window, and the third person pronouns they, them and their. Many Old Norse words still survive in the dialects of Northern England. Contact with Old Norse is also understood to have encouraged or accelerated the reduction of the Old English inflectional system and the transition to the more analytic grammar of Middle and Modern English.

Four of the five boroughs became county towns—of the counties of Leicestershire, Lincolnshire, Nottinghamshire and Derbyshire. Stamford failed to gain such status—perhaps because of the nearby autonomous territory of Rutland.

== Genetic heritage ==
In 2000, the BBC commissioned a genetic survey of the British Isles by a team from University College London led by Professor David Goldstein for its programme 'Blood of the Vikings'. It concluded that Norse (Norwegian) invaders settled sporadically throughout the British Isles with a particular concentration in certain areas, such as Orkney and Shetland. The study did not set out to genetically distinguish descendants of Danish Vikings from descendants of Anglo-Saxon settlers. That was decided on the basis that the latter two groups originated from areas that overlap each other on the continental North Sea coast (ranging from the Jutland Peninsula to Belgium) and were therefore considered too difficult to genetically distinguish. A 10-year genetic study published in 2020 found evidence of a major influx of Danish settlers into England during the Viking period.

== Archaeology ==
Major archaeological sites that bear testimony to the Danelaw are few. The most famous is the site at York. Another Danelaw site is the cremation site at Heath Wood, Ingleby, Derbyshire.

Archaeological sites do not bear out the historically defined area as being a real demographic or trade boundary. This could be due to misallocation of the items and features on which this judgement is based as being indicative of either Anglo-Saxon or Norse presence. Otherwise, it could indicate that there was considerable population movement between the areas, or simply that after the treaty was made, it was ignored by one or both sides.

Thynghowe was an important Danelaw meeting place, today located in Sherwood Forest, in Nottinghamshire. The word howe often indicates a prehistoric burial mound. Howe is derived from the Old Norse word haugr meaning mound. The site's rediscovery was made by Lynda Mallett, Stuart Reddish and John Wood. The site had vanished from modern maps and was essentially lost to history until the local history enthusiasts made their discoveries. Experts think the rediscovered site, which lies amidst the old oaks of an area known as the Birklands in Sherwood Forest, may also yield clues as to the boundary of the ancient Anglo Saxon kingdoms of Mercia and Northumbria. English Heritage recently inspected the site and believes it is a national rarity. Thynghowe was a place where people came to resolve disputes and settle issues. It is a Norse word, although the site may be older still, perhaps even from the Bronze Age.

== See also ==
- List of generic forms in British place names
- Longhouse
- Mjölnir
- Norse–Gaels
- Raven banner
- Runestone
- Stave church
- Subpoena ad testificandum
- Valknut
- Anglo-Scandinavian
- Scandinavian Scotland
- Scandinavian York
- List of monarchs of Northumbria
- Kingdom of Dublin
- Kingdom of the Isles
- English language in Northern England
- Viking activity in the British Isles

== Sources ==
- Higham, Nicholas (2014). "Danelaw". In Lapidge, Michael; Blair, John; Keynes, Simon; Scragg, Donald (eds.). The Wiley Blackwell Encyclopedia of Anglo-Saxon England (2nd ed.). Chichester, West Sussex: Wiley Blackwell. pp. 139–140. ISBN 978-0-470-65632-7.
- Yorke, Barbara (2014). "Guthrum (d.890)". In Lapidge, Michael; Blair, John; Keynes, Simon; Scragg, Donald (eds.). The Wiley Blackwell Encyclopedia of Anglo-Saxon England (2nd ed.). Chichester, West Sussex: Wiley Blackwell. p. 228. ISBN 978-0-470-65632-7.
