= Government in Anglo-Saxon England =

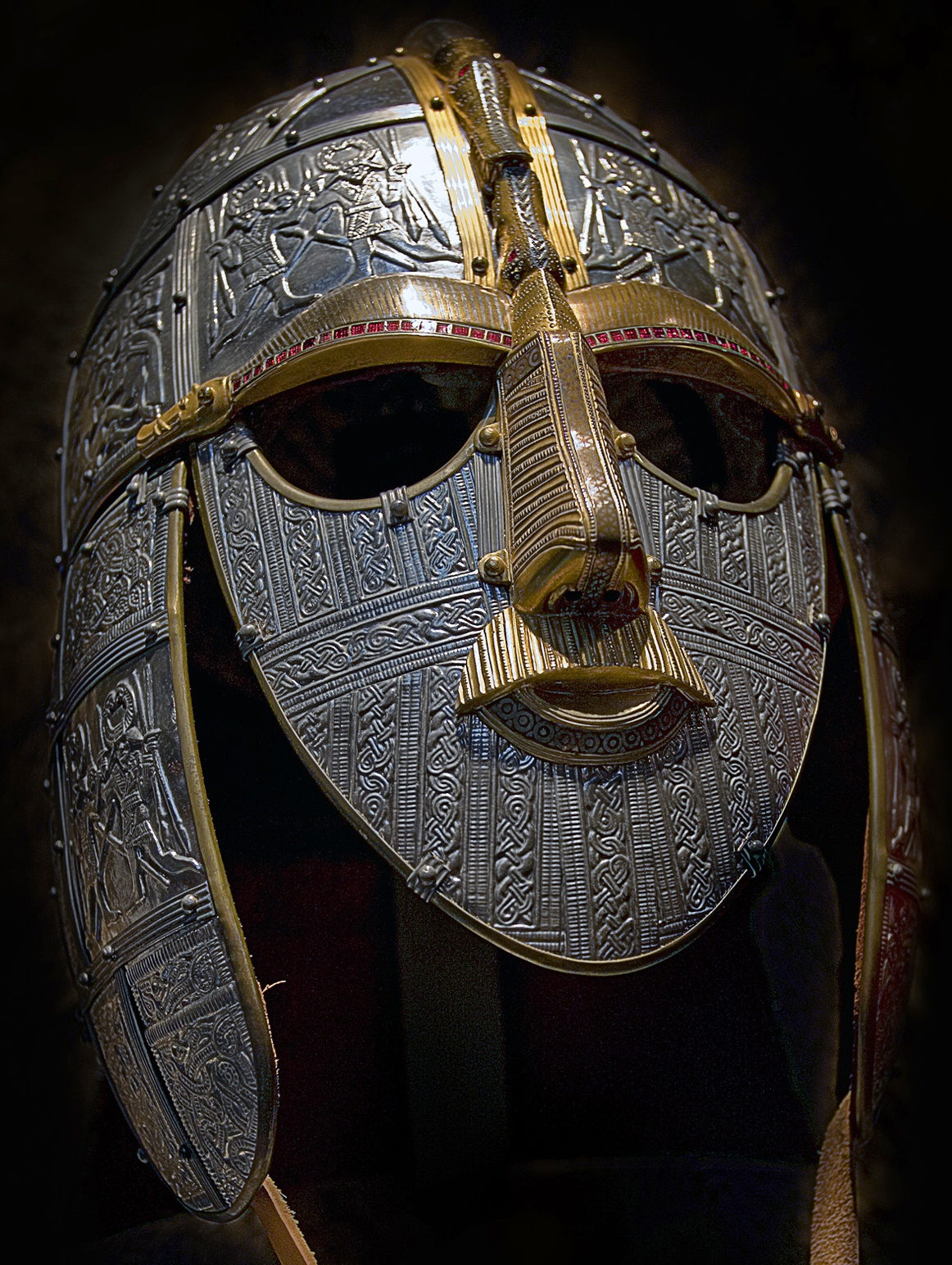
Replica of the 7th-century helmet from Mound 1 at Sutton Hoo. In Anglo-Saxon England, helmets were symbols of royalty and were used in coronations instead of crowns.

Government in Anglo-Saxon England covers English government during the Anglo-Saxon period from the 5th century until the Norman Conquest in 1066.

Until the 9th century, England was divided into multiple Anglo-Saxon kingdoms. Each kingdom had its own laws and customs, but all shared a common basis in the Germanic legal tradition. In the 9th century, the Kingdom of Wessex absorbed the other kingdoms, creating the unified Kingdom of England.

The king's primary responsibilities were to defend his people, dispense justice, and maintain order. Kings had extensive powers to make laws, mint coins, levy taxes, raise armies, regulate trade, and conduct diplomacy. The witan or royal council advised the king, and the royal household provided the administrative machinery of government.

England was divided into ealdormanries led by ealdormen (later earls) appointed by the king. An ealdormanry was divided into shires. The ealdorman enforced royal orders, presided over the shire court, and led the local fyrd (army). A sheriff administered each shire as the ealdorman's deputy. Shires were divided into administrative units called hundreds.

== Before unification ==
=== Anglo-Saxon settlement (300–500) ===
England was part of the Roman Empire since the 1st century CE. Roman Britain was a civil diocese extending from the south coast up to Hadrian's Wall and the Antonine Wall. The diocese was divided into four or five provinces and further divided into civitates (a territorial unit roughly the size of a modern county and centred on a town).

The period between 375 and 425 saw a "total collapse of Romano-British civilisation". Britain's security deteriorated as the Roman army was gradually withdrawn and redeployed to other parts of the Empire to defend against barbarian invasions. After 402, no new Roman coins were issued in Britain, the military stopped being paid, and the military-based economic system collapsed. Most of the Roman army left Britain in 407 to join the revolt of Constantine III, and the Romano-Britons were forced to defend themselves. In 409, the Britons revolted and expelled the Roman authorities, marking the formal end of Roman rule. After Roman rule, Britain experienced widespread anarchy, peasant revolt, and the rise of warlords, such as Vortigern and Ambrosius Aurelianus.

Archaeological evidence for Anglo-Saxon-style jewellery is first found in sites dating to around 430. According to the 6th-century writer Gildas, the Britons hired the Saxons as federate soldiers, but the Saxons eventually seized power from the native Britons. According to Bede, writing c. 731, the settlers came mainly from three Germanic tribes: Saxons, Angles, and Jutes.

Eastern and southern Britain fragmented into small, independent political communities. Based on archaeological evidence (such as burials and buildings), these early communities appear to have lacked any social elite. Around half the population were free, independent farmers (Old English: ceorls) who cultivated enough land to provide for a family (a unit called a hide). Slaves, mostly Britons, made up the other half.

=== Origins of kingship (500–600) ===
By the end of the 6th century, the leaders of Anglo-Saxon political communities were calling themselves kings. The development of kingdoms can partly be explained by the Late Antique Little Ice Age and the Plague of Justinian. These caused famine and other societal disruptions that may have increased violence and led previously independent farmers to submit to the rule of strong lords. The Old English word for lord is hlaford ('loaf-guardian' or 'bread-giver'). Grander buildings and burial practices, such as the construction of burial mounds, also indicate the development of kingship and a social elite.

Germanic kingship provided a model for early Anglo-Saxon kings. Anglo-Saxons inherited the concept of sacred kingship. The Old English word for king was cyning ('son of the kin'). The term implied the king was part of a "specially selected kindred, divinely called to rule over a people". Kingship was passed down through royal dynasties that all claimed descent from a deity, usually Woden. After the Christianisation of Anglo-Saxon England, royal families linked their origins to biblical genealogies.

A Germanic king's power was based on success as a warrior and the collection of land and tribute. A king employed a comitatus (armed retinue) who lived with him in his hall. In addition to providing these warriors with a place to live and food, the king also gave his warriors gifts. Generosity was the mark of a good king.

Anglo-Saxon societies were based on Germanic law and custom. Germanic tribes such as the Ostrogoths, Visigoths, Franks, and Lombards became Romanized to varying degrees by the 5th century. Nevertheless, this was not true of the Anglo-Saxons, who originated from northern Germany and Denmark and had no direct contact with the Roman Empire. For this reason, Roman law only influenced Anglo-Saxon institutions after Christianisation began in the 7th century.

Nevertheless, Roman Britain did have an impact on the organisation of early Anglo-Saxon kingdoms. The kingdoms of Kent, Lindsey, Deira, and Bernicia were based on old Roman civitas. Royal administration centred on the royal vill (Latin: villa; Old English: tun), which was a residence surrounded by dependent settlements. The surrounding population delivered food rent to a royal vill, which would be consumed by the king and his comitatus when they visited on their regular travels through the kingdom.

=== Early kingdoms (600–871) ===
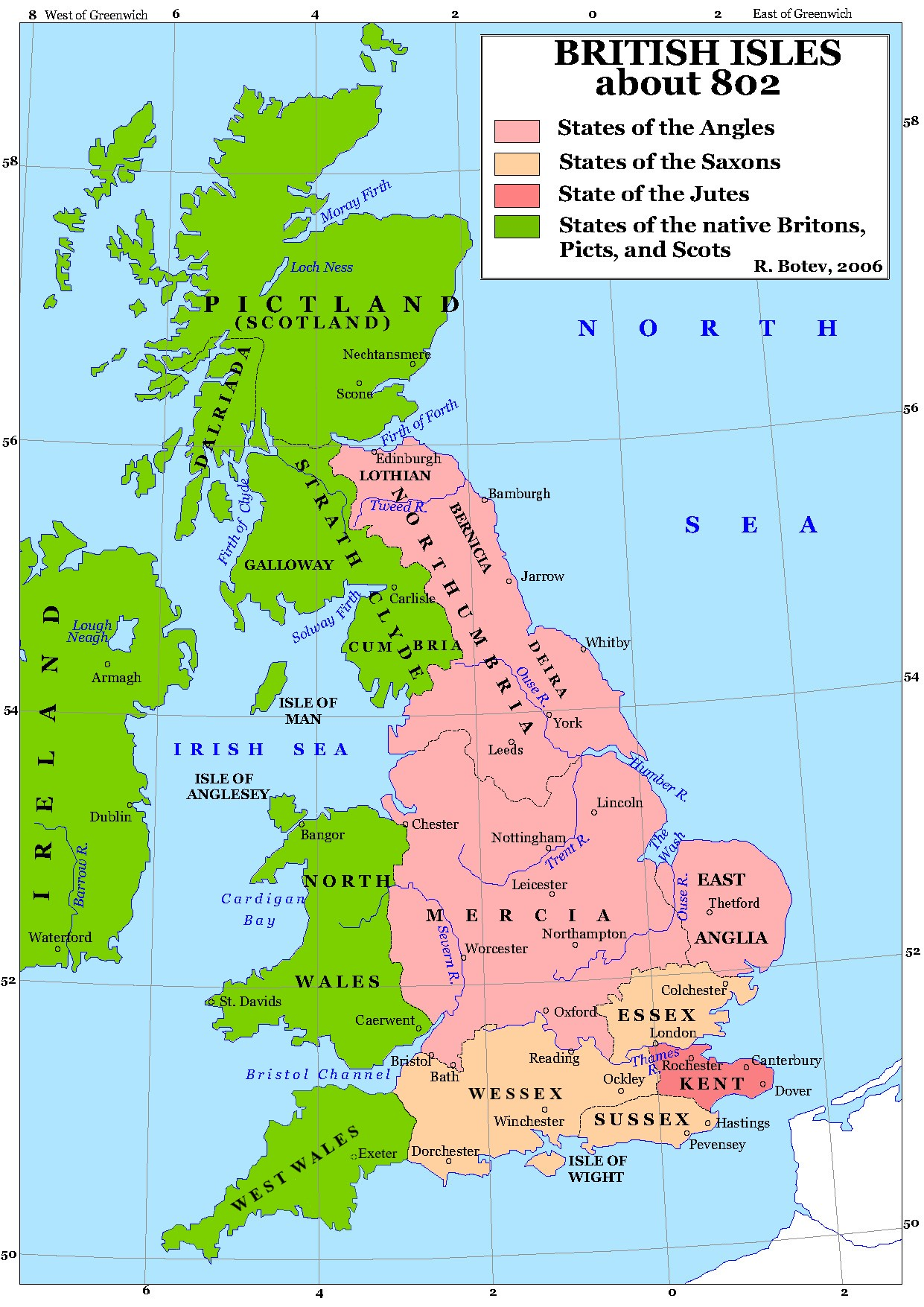
Anglo-Saxon kingdoms c. 802

According to the Tribal Hidage, possibly created in the time of Wulfhere of Mercia (r. 658–675), there were 35 political groups south of the Humber. Many had kings, such as Wessex, East Anglia, Mercia, Kent, the Magonsæte, Lindsey, the Hwicce, Essex, and Sussex. Consolidation through war and marriage meant that by the 9th century only four kingdoms remained: East Anglia, Mercia, Northumbria, and Wessex.

In his Ecclesiastical History of the English People, Bede lists seven kings who achieved imperium or overlordship over England south of the Humber. The first four overlords were Ælle of Sussex (late 5th century), Ceawlin of Wessex (r. 560–592), Æthelberht of Kent (r. 589–616), and Rædwald of East Anglia (r. 599–624). Rædwald was followed by Edwin (r. 616–633), Oswald (r. 633–642), and Oswiu (r. 642–670) of Northumbria.

The 8th century was a period of Mercian supremacy, but Wessex surpassed Mercia in the 820s during the reign of Ecgberht. The Anglo-Saxon Chronicle referred to Ecgberht as bretwalda ('wide-ruler' or 'ruler of Britain') and added his name to Bede's list of overlords. Historian H. R. Loyn remarked that "some hazy imperial ideas" were associated with the bretwaldaship, such as influence over the English church, military leadership against the native Britons, and receiving tribute. Historian Barbara Yorke defines it as the collection of tribute from other kings.

==== Electing and deposing kings ====
Succession did not follow strict primogeniture. When the throne became vacant, a kingdom's witan (secular and ecclesiastical "wise men") chose the new king from among eligible candidates of the ruling dynasty. A candidate's age, ability, popularity, and the wishes of the previous king were all factors that could influence the succession. Since a king was primarily a war leader, he needed to be able to lead an army. For this reason, infant sons could be bypassed in favor of the king's adult brothers. Some kings retired to monasteries when they could no longer perform a military role.

Rites of royal consecration developed slowly. In 787, Ecgfrith of Mercia became the first Anglo-Saxon king anointed with holy oil, imitating Carolingian and biblical precedents.

Witans could formally depose kings. Cynewulf and the West-Saxon witan deposed King Sigeberht in 757. Councils formally deposed several Northumbrian kings. In 774, King Alhred was deposed and replaced by Æthelred I, who was himself ousted in 779. Æthelred was restored as king in 790 and reigned until his murder in 796.

==== Christian kingship ====
Kings played a crucial part in converting their kingdoms to Christianity. Afterward, kings continued to be involved in church affairs. Kings summoned and presided over synods, such as the 664 Synod of Whitby, where Oswiu of Northumbria decided that his kingdom would follow the Roman date of Easter instead of the Celtic date. Christianisation resulted in the production of written law codes, the earliest being Kent's Law of Æthelberht. These early laws attempted to preserve the peace and prevent blood feuds. The church itself operated according to canon law, a legal system based on Roman civil law.

A king had the power to make law and give legal judgment with the advice of his witan. He presided in person as judge of the royal court, which could sentence freemen to death, enslavement, or impose financial penalties. In some instances, the witan could overturn royal decisions. In 840, for example, the Mercian witan ruled that King Berhtwulf had unjustly confiscated land from Heahbeorht, bishop of Worcester. The bishop regained his land, and Berhtwulf gave gifts to the church as compensation.

==== Local administration ====
In the 7th and 8th centuries, kingdoms were divided into administrative units called regiones, which were themselves divided into groups of royal vills. Administrative divisions had different names, such as the shire in Wessex, lathe in Kent, or rape in Sussex.

In the 8th century, the term ealdorman first appeared in the Anglo-Saxon Chronicle. In Wessex, these were royal officials tasked with leading the army and administering justice in a shire. In return, an ealdorman received part of the judicial fines owed to the king. He also may have been granted land for his service. Sometimes, ealdormen were former kings reduced to sub-king status; such was the case in Mercia's absorption of the Hwicce.

All free men had the right to bear arms and a duty to defend the kingdom through service in the fyrd (army). The army's core was the king's comitatus. Fyrd service was one of the obligations known as the trinoda necessitas ("three necessities"). The other two were equally related to military preparedness: the repair of burhs (fortifications) and the repair of bridges (essential for communications).

=== Alfred the Great (871–899) ===
England in 878 at the time of the Treaty of Wedmore

In the 850s, England faced a formidable threat as Viking invaders, led by their Great Heathen Army, conquered most Anglo-Saxon kingdoms. However, under the leadership of Alfred the Great (r. 871–899), Wessex successfully resisted the invaders. In 886, the Treaty of Alfred and Guthrum defined the boundaries of the Danelaw, and Alfred received the submission of all the English, including London, not under the Danelaw.

In response to the Viking invasions, royal government in Wessex became more sophisticated and effective. Alfred built over 30 burhs (fortifications), some of which became permanent towns. Each burh was allocated several hides for its maintenance and support, as illustrated in the Burghal Hidage.

Under Alfred, there were always nine or ten ealdormen. Each West Saxon shire had one ealdorman, while East and West Kent had two. The ealdormen were entrusted with crucial responsibilities, including the management of the army, fortifications, and tax collection in their respective shires. The king granted them estates and special privileges, such as the "third penny" (a third of the shire court's judicial profits). The royal reeves (Latin: praepositi) supervised royal estates and were responsible for administering finances and manpower.

Alfred's heirs continued the work of reconquest. By 955, the newly forged Kingdom of England encompassed Mercia, the Danelaw, and Northumbria. The kingdom's boundaries ran north to the Firth of Forth.

== Royal government ==
=== Kingship ===
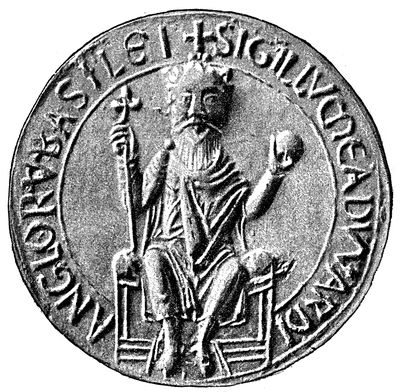
Seal of Edward the Confessor

The king was answerable to God alone; however, a good king surrounded himself with wise counsellors and listened to their advice. The king's inner circle (his family and royal household) helped him to govern. Kings usually legislated in consultation with a witan.

The king's primary responsibility was to protect his people and lead them during wartime. His job was maintaining law, order, and the economy within his kingdom. Kings had extensive powers to make laws, mint coins, levy taxes, raise armies, regulate trade, and conduct diplomacy. The king appointed and removed all royal officers as he saw fit. He had the right to construct bridges and burhs. He was also responsible for the safety of foreigners, a responsibility codified in treaties concerning merchants and diplomats.

"The king was the focus of justice within his realm, dealing with hard cases, failures of justice, and problematic judges." Hundred and shire courts handled most judicial matters, but all freemen had the right to appeal to the king and his witan. By the 10th century, certain offenses were considered "pleas of the king". There were two kinds of king's pleas: cases in which the king was a party and cases involving severe crimes reserved to the king's jurisdiction. These cases could only be tried in the presence of royal officials in the shire court. The laws of Cnut defined king's pleas as:

- violation of the royal protection (mund)
- murder
- treason
- arson
- attacks on houses
- persistent robbery
- counterfeiting
- assault
- harbouring fugitives
- neglect of military service
- fighting
- rape

==== Succession ====
From 899 to 1016, a direct descendant of Alfred the Great of the House of Wessex sat on the English throne. From 1016 to 1042, the Danish House of Knýtlinga possessed the throne. Edward the Confessor (r. 1042–1066) briefly restored the House of Wessex to power. However, he was succeeded in 1066 by Harold Godwinson and then William the Conqueror (r. 1066–1087), whose Conquest of England marked the end of the Anglo-Saxon era.

Theoretically, an element of election was inherent in kingship. Abbot Ælfric of Eynsham expressed this theory in a sermon:

No man can make himself king, but the people has the choice to select as king whom they please; but after he is consecrated as king, he then has dominion over the people, and they cannot shake his yoke from their necks.

In reality, the witan rarely elected kings. A king normally designated a successor during his lifetime, and the witan ratified this decision. If there was no apparent heir, the witan chose the most capable member of the ruling dynasty. Initially, candidates for kingship had to descend from Cerdic, the first West Saxon king. By the 10th century, only sons of kings were considered eligible for kingship and the title of ætheling. Beyond this, there were no strict rules for determining the next king. Sons usually succeeded their fathers, but older relatives could take precedence over young sons. Edmund I (r. 939–946) was succeeded by his brother Eadred (r. 946–955) because his sons were too young. Edmund's son Eadwig (r. 955–959) became king upon the death of his childless uncle.

The absence of well defined rules led to conflict whenever a king died. Æthelwold, son of Æthelred I (r. 865–871) and Alfred's nephew, challenged Edward the Elder's (r. 899–924) claim to the throne and allied with the Danes against Edward. Edward's death also sparked a succession crisis, as did the demise of his grandson, Edgar (r. 959–975). Disputes arose when kings had sons by different wives or when illegitimate sons vied for the throne. Ælfthryth, Edgar's second wife, is believed to have assassinated Edward the Martyr (r. 975–978) to pave the way for her son, Æthelred the Unready (r. 978–1016), to become king.

==== Coronation ====
As part of the coronation ritual, kings swore a three-part oath:

Firstly, that the Church of God and all Christian people keep true peace, by my command. Secondly, I forbid robbery and all unrighteous deeds by all ranks. Thirdly, I promise and order justice and mercy in all judgments, so that compassionate and merciful God, who lives and reigns, may forgive us all through his own mercy.

This oath, known as the promissio regis, was the foundation for subsequent coronation charters and, ultimately, Magna Carta. Following these promises, kings were anointed with holy oil. Similar to priests, anointing bestowed upon kings a sacred status. An anointed king could not be lawfully deposed; thus, a poor ruler was seen as God's retribution for the kingdom's sins.

In the 10th century, coronations typically took place at Kingston upon Thames. Edward the Confessor was crowned at Winchester. In 1066, Harold Godwinson was crowned at the newly consecrated Westminster Abbey, which remained the customary place of coronation for future kings.

=== Royal household ===
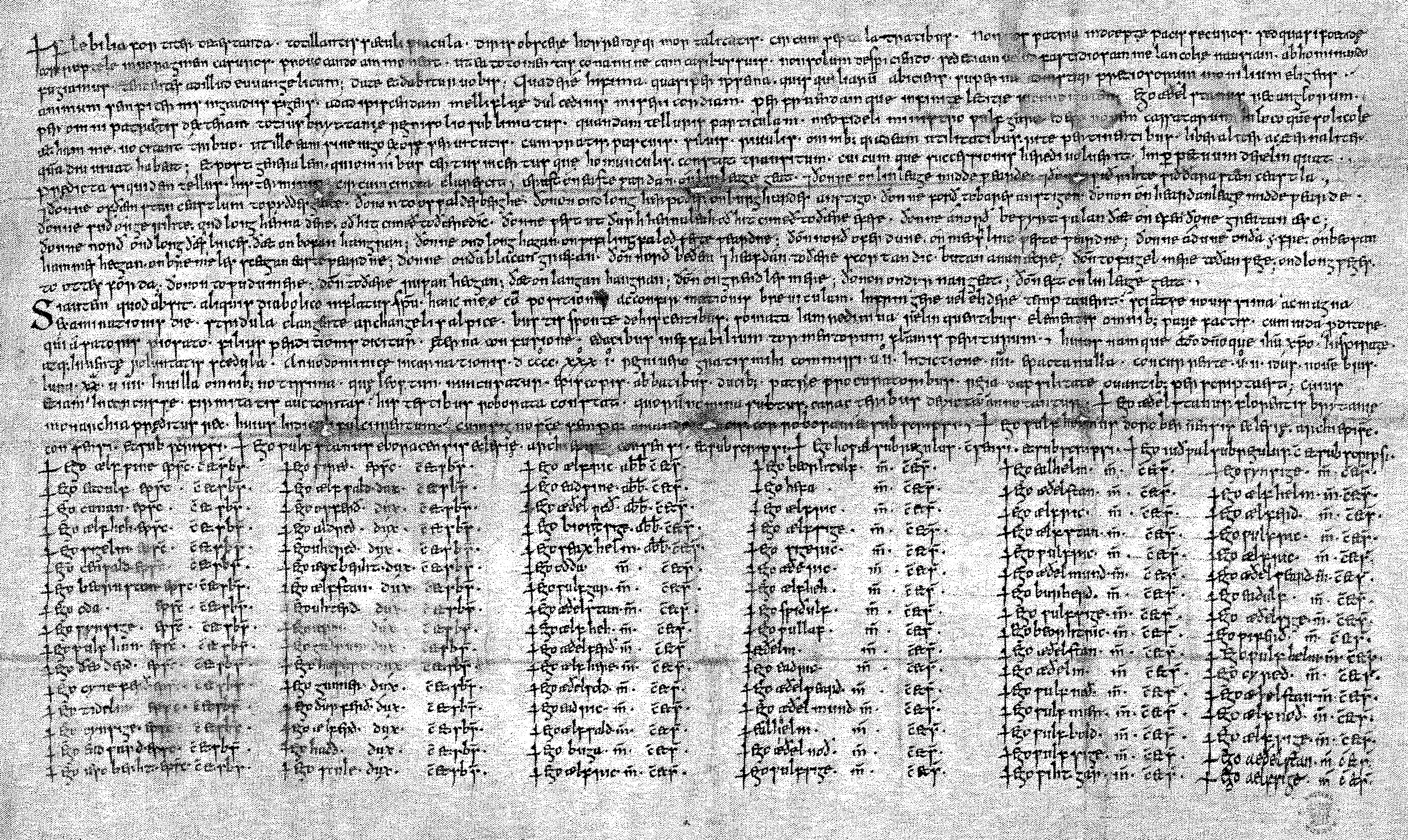
Charter of King Æthelstan written by the royal scribe known as Æthelstan A in 931

The royal household included the royal family, royal favourites, military personnel, priests, clerks, and domestic servants. Ealdormen and thegns served regularly at court. Thegns who served in the royal household were called "king's thegns" and enjoyed higher status than regular thegns. These were also called stallers, a Danish title that probably meant "place-holder". Most noble household members served in rotation. However, a core remained in virtually constant attendance.

While Winchester and London were major cities, England had no fixed capital. The king's household and court were itinerant, with kings constantly traversing southern England (where most royal estates were located) and occasionally venturing north. This mobile court formed the hub of Anglo-Saxon government and performed its executive functions. Kings delegated public duties to household officers, effectively making them state officers. Among these officers, chamberlains and royal priests played pivotal roles in royal administration.

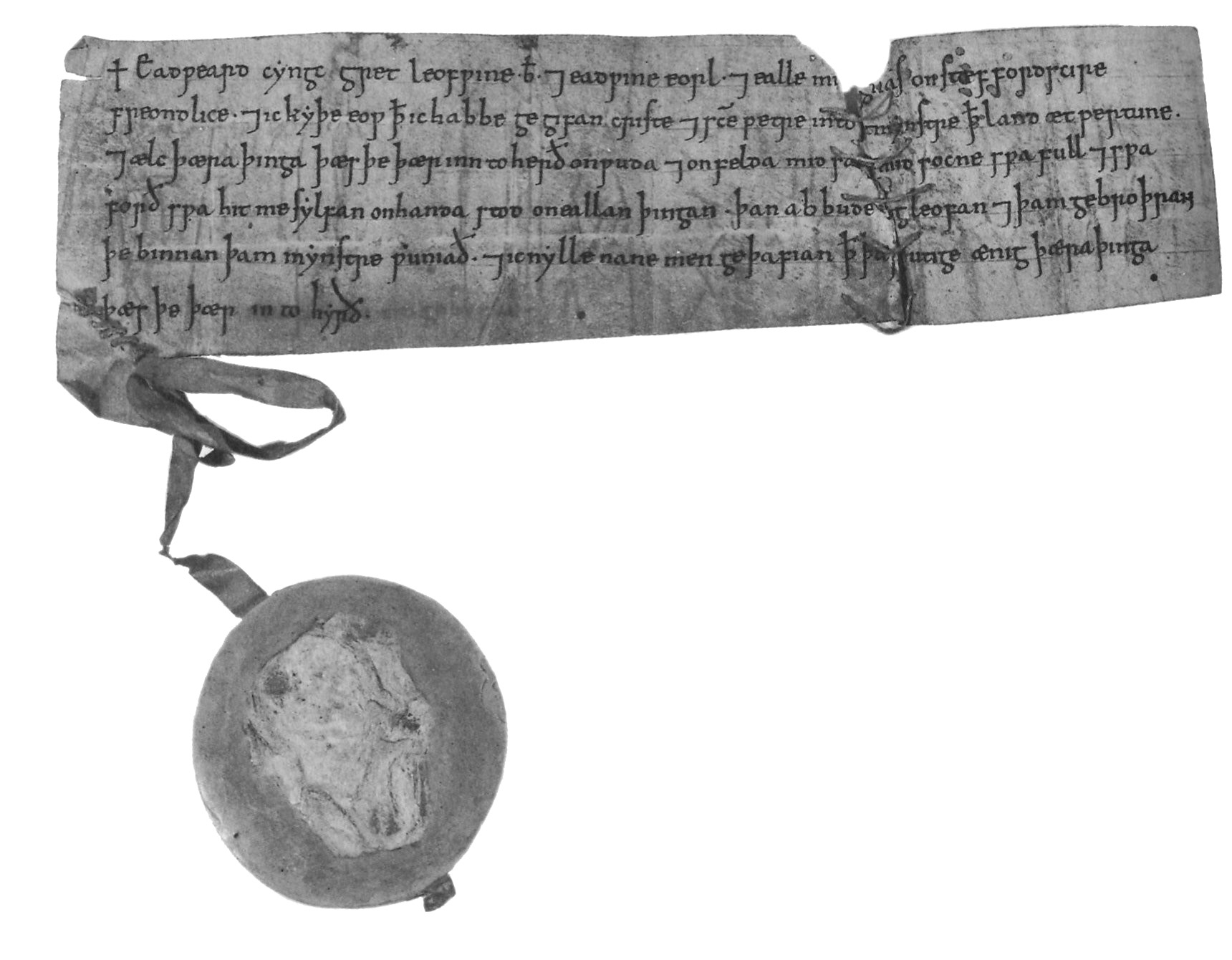
A sealed writ of Edward the Confessor

There were always two or three chamberlains at a time. They were responsible for the royal bedchamber and the king's wardrobe or dressing room. The wardrobe was also where kings stored their valuables, such as money. As a result, the chamber and wardrobe functioned as the government's finance department. The chamber received all royal revenue, including taxation, fines, and income from other sources. The chamber then paid this money out for expenses. Kings stored their treasure in multiple places for convenience. By the time of Edward the Confessor, Winchester was a permanent treasury location.

The priests in the royal chapel provided for the household's spiritual needs. Within the chapel was a scriptorium or writing office dedicated to producing charters, writs, royal letters, and other official documents. Charters or "landbooks" were written in Latin and recorded royal grants of bookland to the church or individuals. A writ was a brief letter from the king with instructions to an official authenticated with a seal hanging from the document like a pendant. It was more efficient than a traditional charter. By the reign of Edward the Confessor, the writing office had custody of the great seal used to authenticate writs. Service in the royal chapel could be a stepping stone towards becoming a bishop. Priests and clerks of the royal household probably had noble backgrounds.

=== Witan ===
Kings had to depend on the great men of the realm to maintain authority—ealdormen, thegns, bishops, and abbots. Nevertheless, kings could not monitor all of these officials, even with an itinerant court. It was much easier to summon the great men to royal councils—meetings of the witan or "wise men". According to historian Bryce Lyon, the witan "was an amoebic sort of organization with no definite composition or function". The term referred to large gatherings of nobles and small councils of advisers in the royal household. When English kings claimed overlordship over their Welsh neighbors, the Welsh kings might also be in attendance. High-ranking churchmen were influential, but not all witans included churchmen.

Whenever the king asked a large or small group of nobles to advise him and to witness or consent to a royal action, that assembly was a witan. Witans deliberated on a wide variety of business, including financial and judicial. Discussion occurred in the English language. A person refusing to appear before a witan was liable to heavy fines and even outlawry. A witan could meet anywhere at any time. London and Winchester were common locations. Christmas, Lent, and Easter were favourite times because many nobles were at the royal court.

The king consulted a witan on significant matters. For example, the king and his advisers drafted laws and submitted them to large witans for consultation and consent. In the words of Lyon, kings "seemed to feel that to consult with men from all parts of the kingdom produced a wider sampling of opinion and gave the law more solid support". Witans took part in both secular and ecclesiastical legislation. Church law, however, was drafted by the clergy, with lay nobles merely giving consent. Witans only consented to extraordinary taxation that would burden the nobility. For example, the witan consented to the Danegeld.

Witans discussed decisions related to war, peace, and treaties. The declaration of a royal will occurred at witans. The witan consented to and witnessed the granting of bookland by charter. When a king died, the witan nominally elected a new king. When a king gained power by conquest, he was careful to gain the witan's assent.

=== Finances ===
==== Coinage ====
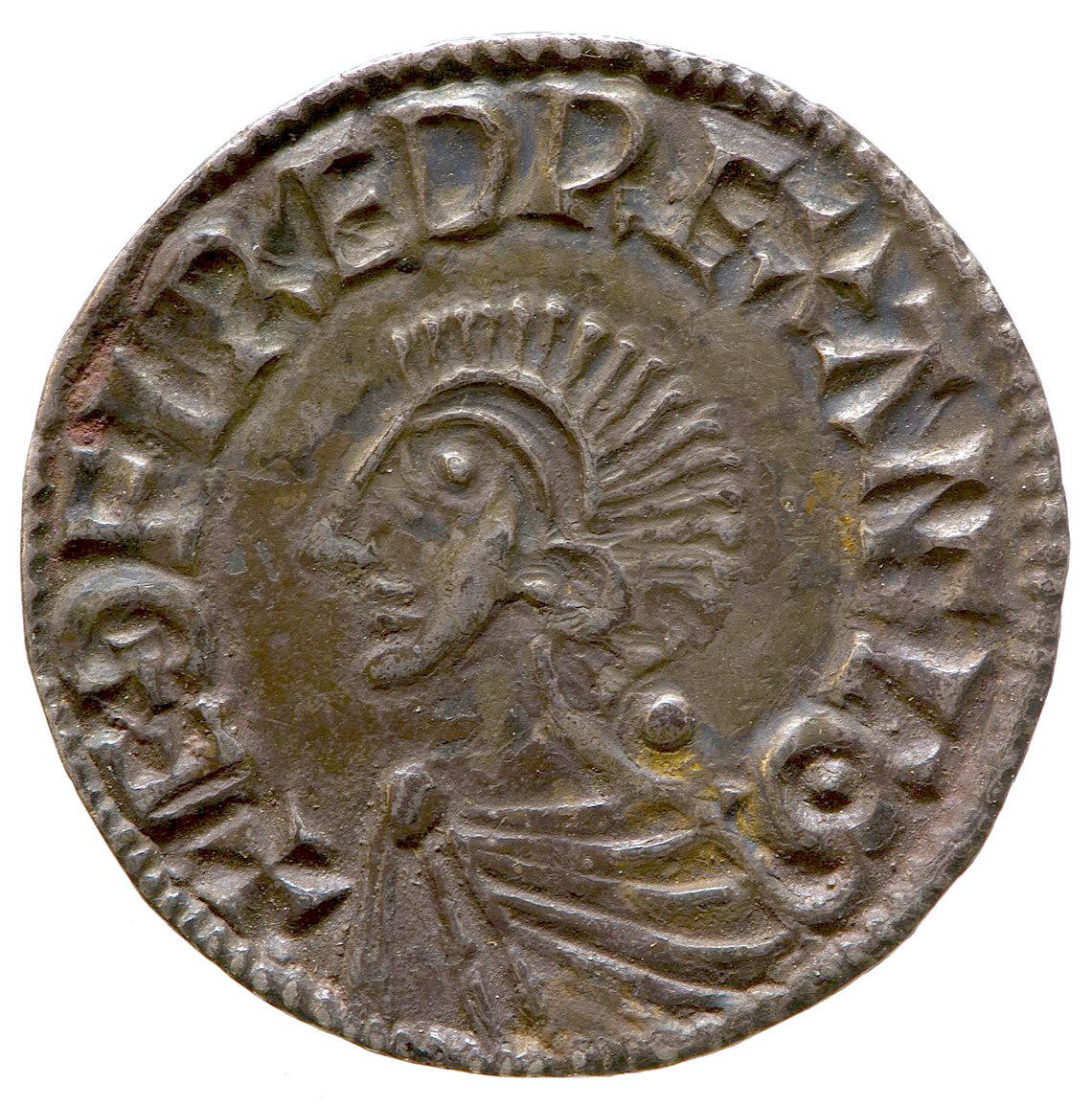
Silver penny of Æthelred the Unready c. 997 – c. 1003

The English coinage was the best in Europe. Unlike France or Germany where lords and bishops minted their own coins, only the king issued coins, and foreign coins were banned.

Æthelstan ordered every burh to have a mint. There were 70 mints in the time of Edward the Confessor. The government kept tight control over the quality and design of the coinage. Moneyers were required to use official coin dies and faced strict penalties for producing counterfeit money. The dies were cut in London and then distributed to the local mints.

Shillings, pounds, and marks were units of account, but the silver penny was the only coin in circulation. The penny's purchasing power was similar to that of a half sovereign before World War I. (Note: This would be worth around £39.09 in 2017 currency.)

==== Royal lands and taxation ====
The king was the largest landowner having inherited a landed estate from his predecessors called the royal demesne (later called the Crown Estate). The demesne generated income through food render or money rent paid by tenants. The royal demesne was divided into individual estates or manors. Some manors were dedicated to providing agricultural produce for the king's household. Other manors were leased to speculators in return for money rent. Royal manors were administered for the king by reeves. The sheriff "farmed" the royal revenues from his county, paid a fixed amount to the royal treasury, and kept the rest for himself.

Kings levied geld, a land tax based on hidage. There were different kinds of geld. After Viking attacks resumed in the 980s, English kings used Danegeld to fund tribute payments until England's conquest by Danish prince Cnut the Great. The heregeld paid soldiers and sailors. The heregeld was abolished in 1049 by Edward the Confessor, who placed responsibility for naval defense on the Cinque Ports in return for special privileges. Geld continued to be levied annually at a regular rate of 2 shillings per hide for the rest of the Anglo-Saxon period.

The king could exempt or grant to others the following rights:

- Collection of the heriot (inheritance tax)
- Collection of tolls and dues at markets, ports, roads, and waterways
- Right to treasure troves and to salvage shipwrecks
- Royal monopoly on mines and saltworks
- Fines paid in criminal and civil cases and for breach of the peace

== Local government ==
=== Ealdormanries and earldoms ===
The ealdorman was an official appointed by the king to administer a shire, and he could be removed at the will of the king. The ealdorman commanded the shire's fyrd (army), co-presided with the bishop over the shire court, and enforced royal orders. He had a right to the "third penny": one-third of the income from the shire court and one-third of the revenue from tolls and dues levied in the boroughs.

Originally, the ealdorman governed a single shire. Starting with Edward the Elder, it became customary for one ealdorman to administer three or four shires together as an ealdormanry. By 965, there were only two or three ealdormen in Wessex, four or five in Mercia, and one in Northumbria. The boundaries of the ealdormanries are unknown, and they may not have covered the entire kingdom. It is possible that the king kept some areas under his personal jurisdiction.

During Cnut's reign, the ealdorman's name was changed to earl (related to Old English eorl and Scandinavian jarl). Cnut's realm, the North Sea Empire, extended beyond England, and he was forced to delegate viceregal power to his earls. Cnut kept Wessex for himself and divided the rest of England into three earldoms: East Anglia, Mercia, and Northumbria. Later, the earldom of Wessex was granted to Godwin. These four earldoms remained the principal ones through the reign of Edward the Confessor.

During the reign of Edward the Confessor, the earls were still royal officers governing their earldoms in the king's name. However, they were developing more autonomy and becoming a threat to royal power. Three great aristocratic families emerged: the Godwins of Wessex, Leofric of Mercia, and Siward of Northumbria. The earldoms of Wessex and Mercia were hereditary by this time. However, Edward deliberately broke the hereditary succession to Northumbria when Earl Siward died in 1055. He ignored the claims of Siward's son Waltheof and appointed Tostig as earl. The earldom of East Anglia appears to have been used as a training ground for new earls.

=== Shires ===
As the ealdorman's jurisdiction expanded, he delegated more responsibility to his reeves. The office of sheriff or "shire reeve" developed by the middle of the 10th century. By 1066, the sheriff was in charge of local government. He was the shire's chief military, financial, and judicial officer. The king relied on him to supervise royal estates and collect taxes and other revenue. He presided over the shire court, publicized royal pronouncements, enforced royal commands, and pursued criminals. Deputy reeves assisted him. The king appointed and dismissed sheriffs as he pleased.

The shire court met twice a year around Easter and Michaelmas. It was an administrative and judicial body with jurisdiction over criminal, civil, and ecclesiastical cases. The sheriff (or sometimes the earl) and the bishop presided, but there was no judge in the modern sense (royal justices would not sit in shire courts until the reign of Henry I). The local aristocracy controlled the court. The suitors of the court (bishops, earls, and thegns) declared the law and decided what proof of innocence or guilt to accept (such as ordeal or compurgation). The shire court handled administrative business, such as arrangements for collecting geld.

=== Hundreds and boroughs ===
Sometime in the 10th century, kings divided shires into hundreds or wapentakes. Initially, the hundred was an administrative district comprising a hundred hides headquartered at a royal vill. The hundred court met once a month. It handled routine judicial business, civil as well as criminal. It had jurisdiction over land ownership, tort, and ecclesiastical cases. People could appeal their cases to the shire court or to the king.

The sheriff presided two or three times a year, and a subordinate reeve presided at other times. Any landowning freeman could attend the hundred court. However, thegns controlled the court. As suitors to the court, the thegns (or their bailiffs) were responsible for declaring the law, deciding what form of proof to accept, and assisting with the court's administrative functions. Kings granted lords, bishops, and monasteries jurisdiction over some hundreds. In these private hundreds, the lord controlled the hundred court and received the profits of justice. The abbey of Bury St Edmunds, for example, controlled over eight hundreds in Suffolk.

The sheriff ensured that all men belonged to tithings. The tithing was a method of self-policing. The men of a tithing were responsible for bringing an accused person to court. If the accused escaped, the tithing was fined.

Most people in Anglo-Saxon England lived in small agricultural communities under the control of a lord. These communities were called tuns, townships, vills, or manors. The king could grant ecclesiastical and lay lords the right of sac and soc ("cause and suit"), toll and team, and infangenetheof over their estates. By the 11th century, most lords possessed these rights.

England experienced a revival of commerce and trade in the 10th and 11th centuries. Kings gave towns borough status in order to facilitate trade. Boroughs had courts (burghmoots, portmanmoots, or hustings) to provide adequate witnesses for commercial deals. London's Court of Husting had the power of a shire court, and the city was subdivided into wards. The merchants who lived in boroughs gained rights not available to rural peasants. These included freedom of movement, which was necessary for trade, and freedom from service to a lord. An early form of burgage tenure already existed. The portreeve was an important town officer.

In addition to the regular divisions of a shire, there also existed special jurisdictions called liberties where the sheriff had limited power and where dues owed to the king were granted to local lords. Some of these, such as the Soke of Peterborough, survived into modern times as local authorities.

== Church and state ==
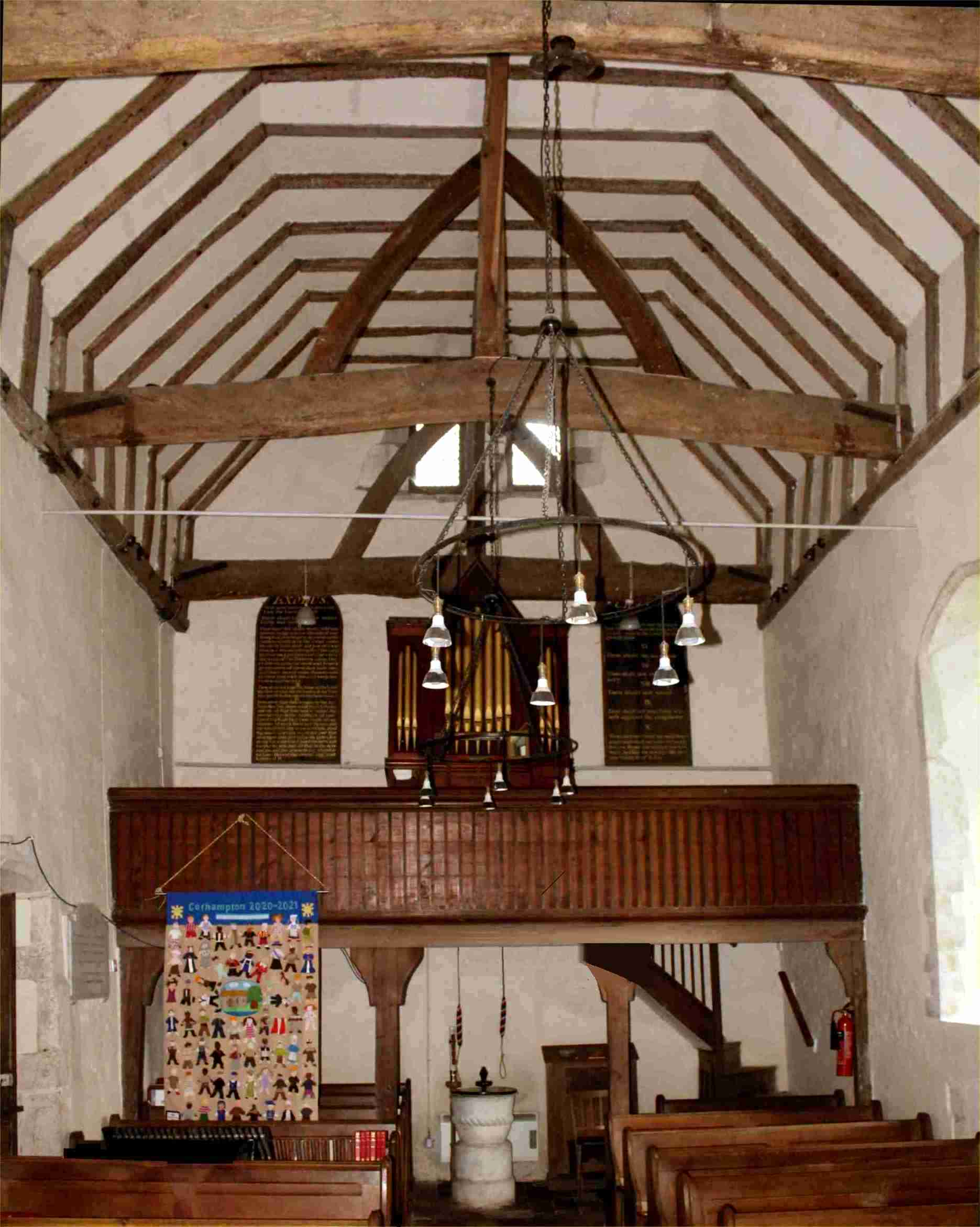
Anglo-Saxon Corhampton Church

The English monarchy and the English church were mutually reinforcing institutions. Through coronation, the church provided the king with divine sanction and, in return, the church expected to receive royal protection. The church exercised significant influence over royal administration. The king relied on literate clergy to staff his household and help him govern. Bishops and abbots advised the king in the witan and helped shape royal law codes.

Nevertheless, the king exercised significant control over the church. He appointed bishops (or at least approved their nomination by cathedral chapters) and abbots, who were as much political figures as they were spiritual leaders. Bishops and abbots controlled large estates belonging to their dioceses or monasteries, so they were wealthy magnates in their own right. Just like lay lords, they were responsible for the administrative, judicial, and military concerns of their lands. Some bishops actively took part in fighting, such as the warrior bishop Leofgar of Hereford.

== Military ==
In the Anglo-Saxon period, England had no standing army. However, kings and nobles kept household bodyguards. Since the time of Æthelred the Unready, these included Scandinavian mercenaries called housecarls. The king's retinue would have also included household thegns and cnihtas (Old English for "knights").

Kings could reinforce these household troops in different ways. Holders of bookland were obligated to provide a certain number of men based on the number of hides they owned, and all free men were obligated to perform military service in the fyrd. When called on by the king, shires would supply a certain number of men to the fyrd. It is known that Berkshire owed one soldier for every five hides of land, and it has been estimated that a full national army could have been as large as 14,000 men.

The burhs or boroughs played an important role in defending the countryside. Every hide owed one man for burh service, either in maintenance or garrison duty. It is likely that earls and sheriffs would lead troops on campaign, while the bishop would supervise the defence of his diocese.

Edward the Confessor maintained a small fleet manned by foreign mercenaries, probably Vikings. It had 14 ships in 1050. In addition, the Cinque Ports provided a certain amount of ships in return for judicial rights.
