= Limenwara =

The Limenwara or Limenware were a people of Anglo-Saxon England whose territory formed a regio or early administrative subdivision of the Kingdom of Kent. The name means "Limen-dwellers", with "Limen" being the name of the former eastern arm of the River Rother, which at that time entered the sea at Lympne.

The territory was based around two main settlements, with Lympne as the original royal vill and centre of royal administration and Lyminge emerging from an outlying estate as the territory's minster and centre of ecclesiastic administration. There is evidence of considerable continuity with earlier Roman occupation: Lympne was the site of the Roman Saxon Shore fort of Portus Lemanis, and the minster at Lyminge possibly occupying the site of an earlier Roman temple.

The territory of the Limenwara survived as one of the lathes of the later county of Kent, originally taking its name from the Limenwara themselves, but later being renamed the lathe of Shepway.

== Bibliography ==
- Brooks, Nicholas (1998), Anglo-Saxon Myths: State and Church, 400-1066, London: Bloomsbury Publishing, ISBN 0826457924
