= Witan =

King's council in Anglo-Saxon England

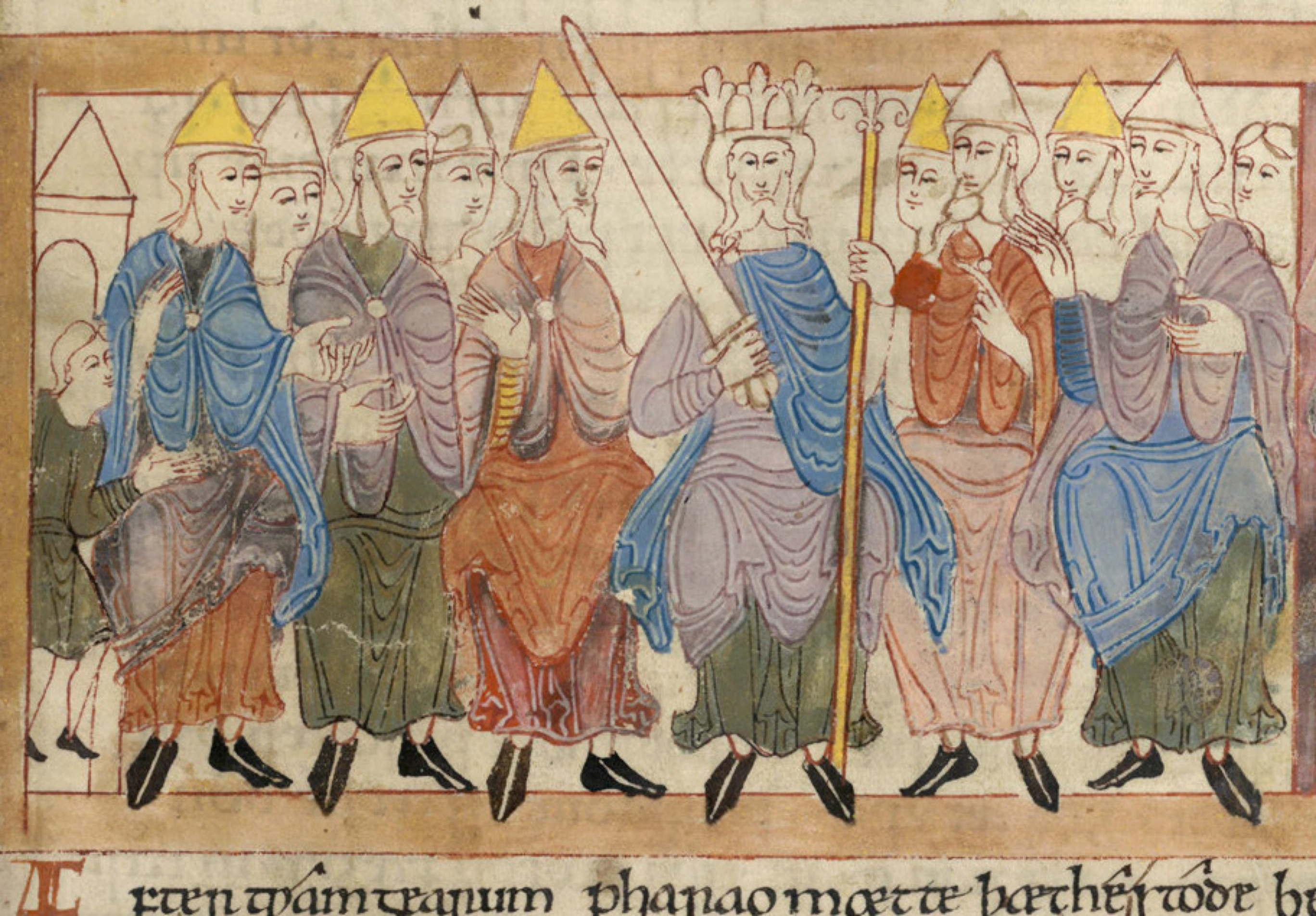
Anglo-Saxon king with his witan (from Old English Hexateuch, 11th century)

The witan (lit. 'wise men') was the king's council in the Anglo-Saxon government of England from before the 7th century until the 11th century. It comprised important noblemen, including ealdormen, thegns, and bishops. Meetings of the witan were sometimes called the witenagemot. (Note: Pronounced /ˈwɪtɪnəjəˌmoʊt/ WIT-in-ə-yə-MOHT or /ˈwɪtɪnəɡəˌmoʊt/ WIT-in-ə-gə-MOHT.)

Its primary function was to advise the king on legislation, judicial cases, land transfers, and other matters of national importance. The witan may have elected new kings from among members of the ruling dynasty. After the Norman Conquest in 1066, these roles were performed by a similar council known as the curia regis.

Before the 20th century, many historians considered the witan to be a proto-parliament, an institution both democratic and representative, and in substance an ancestor of the Parliament of England. Later historical interpretation, however, has emphasised the witan's ad hoc and essentially royal nature.

== Etymology ==
The Old English word witan (lit. 'wise men') described the counsellors of Anglo-Saxon kings. At the same time, the word could also refer to other kinds of counsellors, such as the witan of a shire court. Wulfstan II, Archbishop of York (1002–1023), wrote in his Institutes of Polity that "it is incumbent on bishops, that venerable 'witan' always travel with them, and dwell with them, at least of the priesthood; that they may consult with them ... and who may be their counsellors at every time." A contemporary account of a dispute over an estate in Middlesex in the 950s refers to a decision of the Myrcna witan ('Mercian witan').

The most common Old English term for a meeting of the witan is gemot, sometimes expanded as micel gemot ('great assembly'). Writers of Latin texts used conventus or magnum sapientium conventus (lit. 'great assembly of wise men'). Modern scholars use witenagemot ('assembly of counsellors') as a technical term, but historian John Maddicott noted its rarity in the 11th century with only nine pre-Conquest examples, mainly in the crisis of 1051–1052. Patrick Wormald was also cautious, describing it as "a word always rare and unattested before 1035".

== Origins ==
The origins of the witan lie in the practice of Germanic kings seeking the advice of their great men. This practice survived within the many Anglo-Saxon kingdoms established after the end of Roman rule in Britain. Maddicott writes that these early "royal assemblies lacked the institutional qualities of regularity, formality of structure, and a distinctive agenda" seen in later assemblies. They were also distinctly local. The first recorded act of a witenagemot was the law code of King Æthelberht of Kent c. 600, the earliest document which survives in sustained Old English prose.

Before the 9th century, only church councils, such as the Council of Hertford in 672, transcended the boundaries of individual kingdoms. With the unification of England in the 10th century, the witan acquired a national scope for the first time.

== Attendance and locations ==
According to historian Bryce Lyon, the witan "was an amoebic sort of organization with no definite composition or function". It does appear, however, that an indispensable requirement was the presence of leading secular and ecclesiastical magnates. Kings issued royal charters at meetings of the witan, and historians use the witness lists to these charters to discover who attended. About 2,000 charters and 40 law codes attest to the workings of around 300 recorded witan meetings. Typically, scribes listed witnesses in hierarchical order, with the king listed first, followed by:

- the queen
- æthelings (princes)
- bishops
- abbots
- ealdormen (later earls)
- thegns

When English kings claimed overlordship over their Welsh neighbors, the Welsh kings might also be in attendance.

Anglo-Saxon England lacked a fixed capital, and the royal court was itinerant. The witan convened at various locations, including royal palaces, towns, and hunting lodges. Between 900 and 1066, over 50 locations were recorded. London and Winchester were popular meeting places, and other locations included: Abingdon, Amesbury, Andover, Aylesford, Cookham, Dorchester, Faversham, King's Enham, Southampton, Wantage, Oxford, Kirtlington, and Woodstock. In the West Country, meetings were held at Gloucester, Axminster, Bath, Calne, Cheddar, Chippenham, Cirencester, Edington, Malmesbury, Winchcombe, and Exeter. While meetings in the North were rare, the witan did convene at Nottingham in 934 and at Lincoln in 1045. The witan could meet at any time, but it often gathered during Christmas, Lent, and Easter when many nobles were present at court.

== Role ==
The witan played a significant role in legislation. The king and his advisers would draft laws and then seek the witan's consultation and consent. As Lyon points out, this process was a testament to the king's belief in gathering opinions from all parts of the kingdom, which "produced a wider sampling of opinion and gave the law more solid support". The witan took part in both secular and ecclesiastical legislation. Church law, however, was drafted by the clergy, with lay nobles merely giving consent.

The witan's influence was not limited to legislation. The king sought its advice and consent for extraordinary taxation that would burden the nobility, such as the Danegeld. The witan deliberated on matters of war, peace, and treaties. The declaration of royal wills occurred at witan meetings.

Kings issued charters granting bookland at witan meetings. The witness lists attached to these charters proved that the witan consented to the grants. This practice originated from the late Roman law, which required witnesses for private transactions. Historian Levi Roach explains that the "adoption of this method of authentication for early English diplomas is understandable: in the absence of direct bureaucratic continuity with the late Roman Empire, which effectively precluded sealing or notarial subscription, as practised elsewhere, the use of witnesses, mirroring the methods of authentication used for private transactions on the continent, was an elegant solution."

== Electing and deposing kings ==
The witan was noted by contemporary sources as having the singular power to ceosan to cynige, 'to choose the king' from amongst the extended royal family. Nevertheless, at least until the 11th century, royal succession generally followed the "ordinary system of primogeniture". The historian Chadwick interpreted these facts as proof that the so-called election of the king by the witan merely amounted to formal recognition of the deceased king's natural successor. But Liebermann was generally less willing than Chadwick to see the witan's significance as buried under the weight of the royal prerogative:

The influence of the king, or at least of kingship, on the constitution of the assembly seems, therefore, to have been immense. But on the other hand he (the king) was elected by the witan ... He could not depose the prelates or ealdormen, who held their office for life, nor indeed the hereditary thanes ... At any rate, the king had to get on with the highest statesmen appointed by his predecessor, though possibly disliked by him, until death made a post vacant that he could fill with a relation or a favourite, not, however, without having a certain regard to the wishes of the aristocracy.

Liebermann's more subtle position seems to be vindicated by testimony from abbot Ælfric of Eynsham, the leading homilist of the late tenth century, who wrote:

No man can make himself king, but the people has the choice to choose as king whom they please; but after he is consecrated as king, he then has dominion over the people, and they cannot shake his yoke off their necks.

In addition to having a role in the election of kings, it is often held that the witenagemots had the power to depose an unpopular king. However, there are only two occasions when this probably happened, in 757 and 774 with the depositions of kings Sigeberht of Wessex and Alhred of Northumbria respectively.

The witan's powers are illustrated by the following event. In the year 1013 King Æthelred II (Æthelred the Unready) fled the country from Sweyn Forkbeard, who then had the witan proclaim him king. Within a few weeks, however, Sweyn died and Æthelred was called back to England by the witan. According to the Anglo-Saxon Chronicle, the witan would only receive him back under the condition that he promise to rule better than he had. Æthelred did so, and was reinstated as King of England. His nickname of the 'Unræd' or 'Unready' means ill-advised, indicating that contemporaries regarded those who sat in the witan as part responsible for the failure of his reign.

At the end of 1065, King Edward the Confessor fell into a coma without clarifying his preference for the succession. He died on 5 January 1066, according to the Vita Ædwardi Regis, but not before briefly regaining consciousness and commending his widow and the kingdom to Harold's "protection". When the witan convened the next day they selected Harold to succeed as ruler of England.

== Norman Conquest ==
After the Norman Conquest in 1066, William I replaced the witan with the curia regis (Latin for 'king's court'). In a sign of the witan's enduring legacy, the curia regis continued to be dubbed a witan by chroniclers until as late as the 12th century. Maddicott writes that the witan (what he terms "royal assemblies") were "the direct forebears of the councils of post-Conquest England and the parliaments which were the councils' descendants".

== Historiography ==
The "Saxon myth" claimed that the old Saxon witan was the representative assembly of English landholders until disbanded by the Norman invaders and that it reemerged as the Parliament of England. This idea was held across the Thirteen Colonies in North America in the years prior to the American Revolution (1776–1783). Among the believers were Thomas Jefferson and Jonathan Mayhew. The Whig historians of the 19th century were concerned with explaining the evolution of the English constitution, and they found in the witan a proto-parliament or in the words of Felix Liebermann, "one of the lineal ancestors of the British Parliament".

After World War I, historians such as Frank Stenton and Dorothy Whitelock shifted their focus to understanding the Anglo-Saxon period on its own terms. In his 1943 Anglo-Saxon England, Stenton chose to use the term "King's Council" in place of witan and witenagemot. This change in terminology signalled an important change in the way Anglo-Saxon political assemblies were perceived. Instead of proto-parliaments, the assemblies were essentially royal institutions. Other historians followed Stenton's lead.

Scholars such as Stenton have noted that the witenagemot was in many ways different from the future institution of the Parliament of England; it had substantially different powers and some major limitations, such as a lack of a fixed procedure, schedule, or meeting place. In his 1995 biography of Alfred the Great, historian David Sturdy argues that the witan did not embody modern notions of a "national institution" or a "democratic" body. He writes, "Victorian notions of a national 'witan' are crazy dreams without foundation, myths of a 'democratic parliament' that never was."

While many modern historians avoid the terms witan and witenagemot, few would go as far as Geoffrey Hindley, who described witenagemot as an "essentially Victorian" coinage. The Blackwell Encyclopaedia of Anglo-Saxon England prefers "king's council" but adds that it was known in Old English as the witan. Maddicott regarded the word witan with suspicion, even though it is used in sources such as the Anglo-Saxon Chronicle. In his study of the origins of the English parliament, he generally preferred the more neutral word "assembly":

But the word carries with it, however unjustifiably, a fustian air of decayed scholarship, and, in addition, its use may seem to prejudge the answer to an important question: do we have here an institution, a capitalized 'Witan', as it were, or merely a lower-case ad hoc gathering of the wise men who were the king's councillors?

Henrietta Leyser commented in 2017 that for decades historians avoided using the word witan for assemblies in case they were interpreted as proto-parliaments, and she went on: "Recent historiography, however, has reintroduced the term since it is clear that it was generally accepted that certain kinds of business could only be transacted with a substantial number of the king's wise men, in other words, in the company of his 'witan'". She does not mention the term witenagemot.

== See also ==
- Councils of Clovesho
- Elective monarchy
- Kurultai
- Loya Jirga, a similar concept from Afghanistan
- Majlis
- Panchayati Raj
- Oyomesi
