= Godley Hundred =

Historical division of Surrey, England

Coordinates: 51°24′27″N 0°31′46″W

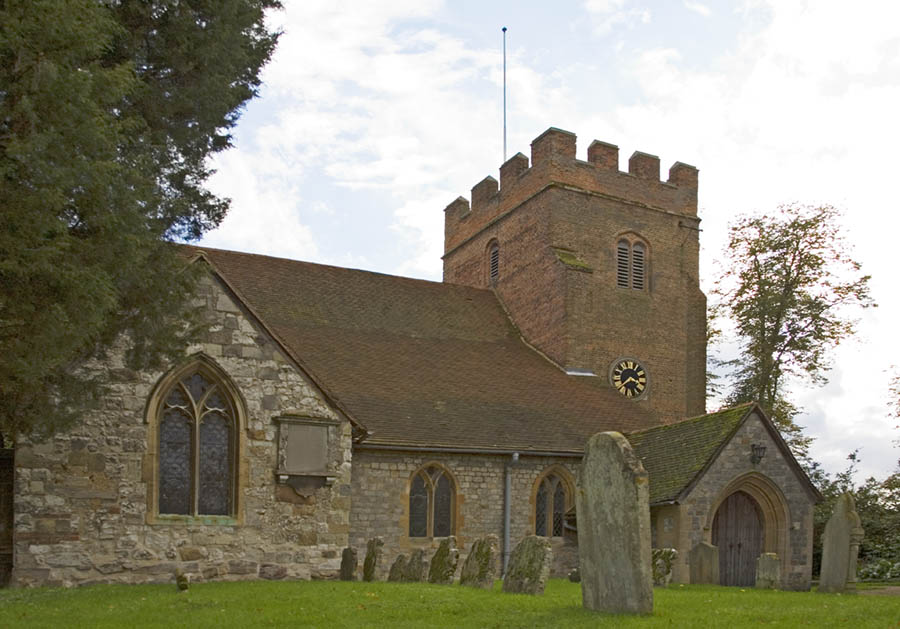
St Mary's Church, Thorpe which was built in the early 7th century within the Godley hundred

Godley was a hundred in what is now Surrey, England. Egham, Thorpe, Chertsey and Chobham are all mentioned in the Chertsey Abbey charter of 673 AD due to a donation by Frithuwold. Chobham manor needed to be large to have a reasonable economic importance as it covered very poor quality heathland. Most of the population of the hundred would have settled on the more fertile alluvial soil bordering the River Thames.

Godley appears in Domesday Book of 1086 as Godelie. Godley was a hundred (these are not marked on the Surrey map, which shows only Domesday manors) an administrative area, where local leaders met about once a month. It included the manors of Chobham, Egham, Thorpe, Chertsey, Pyrford and Byfleet. Pyrford is within the Godley hundred but unusually lies within the Woking parish.

The hundred was probably bounded to the west by the River Blackwater and to the north by the River Thames. To the north was the Land of Sunningas; to the south Woking (hundred) and then the Land of Godhelmingas, to the west the Land of Basingas.

In the Godley hundred, in Saxon times, the heriot, death duties, usually consisted of the tenants' best beast.

== See also ==
- Medieval Surrey
- Surrey hundreds
