= Regiones =

Early Anglo-Saxon division

Regiones (singular: regio) or provinciae,(singular: provincia), also referred to by historians as small shires or early folk territories, were early territorial divisions of Anglo-Saxon England, referred to in sources such as Anglo-Saxon charters and the writings of Bede. They are likely to have originated in the years before 600, and most evidence for them occurs in sources from or about the 7th century.

Regiones were self-sufficient units of mixed subsistence agriculture consisting of scattered settlements producing the range of foodstuffs and other forms of produce necessary to support their population.

Regiones gradually fragmented in the later Anglo-Saxon period as land was granted into private or ecclesiastical ownership by charter, and the smaller manors that emerged were gradually re-organised for military purposes into hundreds and the larger shires that later evolved into counties. The patterns of obligation that characterised regiones were often retained between successor manors, however, and their traces can be seen in many of the sokes, thanages, liberties, baronies and other administrative and ecclesiastic divisions that characterised later medieval society.

Some historians have identified regiones with the concept of the Anglo-Saxon multiple estate. Others have argued that, while similarly organised, multiple estates represent a later stage of territorial organisation, after the concept of folkland or tribal occupation and obligation began to be replaced by that of bookland or documented private ownership.

== Naming and areas ==
Primary historical sources refer to these areas exclusively in Latin as regiones or provinciae and it is not known what the equivalent contemporary Old English term would have been. Several different terms were used when original Latin texts were later translated, including -ge, which meant "district" and survived as the second element of the names of several regiones including Eastry and Ely; and meagth, which meant "kindred", suggesting the areas had tribal origins.

In areas of Jutish settlement - such as the Kingdom of Kent and the area around the Solent - regiones often took the name of a topographical element with the Old English suffix "-wara" meaning "-dwellers". Examples include the Wihtwara of the Isle of Wight, the Meonwara of the area around the River Meon in south Hampshire, the Limenwara around the River Rother (formerly known as the Limen) in Kent.

Similar units with names ending in "-ingas" meaning "people of..." can be found in areas of Saxon settlement. Examples in Wessex include the areas of the Readingas, Sunningas and Basingas around Reading, Sonning and Basingstoke. In the Kingdom of Essex examples have been identified including the Berecingas around Barking, the Haeferingas of modern Havering, the Uppingas of Epping and the Hrothingas that occupied the area of the modern Rodings.

Examples in areas of Anglian settlement include the Blithingas around Blythburgh in the Kingdom of East Anglia. Many of the smaller areas mentioned in the Tribal Hidage are likely to have been regiones.

Within the area of the Kingdom of Northumbria regiones were often named after their central place with the Old English suffix "-scīr" – for example Hallamshire or Hexhamshire – which has led historians to refer to them as "small shires" to distinguish them from the later shires that evolved into the historic counties of England.

== Origins ==
Various explanations exist for how these territorial units may have formed in the 5th and 6th centuries. The first elements in names ending in -ingas have often been interpreted as personal names, and the territories have often been seen as the areas settled by families or political groups led by those named individuals, or perhaps with them as their earliest known common ancestor.

Regiones may have formed from earlier units based around centres such as hillforts in the aftermath of the end of Roman rule in Britain, subsequently transferred to Anglo-Saxon rulers. Some regiones carry evidence of continuity with earlier Roman or pre-Roman subdivisions, including that of the Brahhingas, which was based around Braughing in modern Hertfordshire, the site of both an earlier Iron Age oppidum and a large Roman town. This would suggest that regiones succeeded the Roman subdivisions of civitates known as pagi.

Many small shires have been identified in the area of the south east of modern Scotland that was under Northumbrian control during the early medieval period, but many with identical features have also been identified north of the River Forth in areas that were never under Anglo-Saxon or Roman rule, suggesting that the territories may have even earlier Celtic origins.

== Structure and role ==
Regiones were characterised by well-defined areas, generally of the order of 100 square miles (26,000 ha) and often made up of 12 vills. They generally conformed to local topography, occupying a geographically coherent area such as a defined stretch of a river valley. They constituted self-contained and organised economic units of subsistence agriculture including a diverse range of scattered settlements practising a mix of arable and pastoral farming and sharing common grazing land.

Regiones were typically centred upon a royal vill. Anglo-Saxon England lacked the high volume trade in essential foodstuffs necessary to sustain a large royal household in a single location. Royal vills therefore formed a network of halls and accommodation across a kingdom through which a royal household would tour in an itinerary, where each regio would provide food renders to support the royal household and from where the regio and the wider kingdom would be administered.

Where they are recorded in charters or by Bede the rulers of regiones are referred to as principes (princes), reguli (kings) or subreguli (sub-kings).

== Later territorial continuity ==
The regio as a basic territorial unit gradually fragmented during the later Anglo Saxon period. The smaller manors that characterise the Domesday Book emerged from within regiones through the endowment of churches with land, the rewarding of officials and the division of a family's land among inheritors.

In Kent the areas of the regiones survived as the lathes into which the later county was subdivided. The rapes of Sussex, which similarly each included several hundreds, may also reflect the regiones that made up the earlier Kingdom.

Away from those areas traces of earlier regiones can be found where later groups of hundreds contributed to a single royal manor. In 1066 the 19 hundreds of Oxfordshire were annexed in this manner to 7 royal manors that included Headington, Kirtlington and Bensington. In Berkshire and north Hampshire the regio centres of Reading, Sonning and Basingstoke remained centres of distinctive groupings of hundreds throughout the Middle Ages, with the "Six hundreds of Basingstoke" and the "Seven hundreds of Cookham and Bray" referred to in medieval records closely resembling the earlier territories of the Basingas and Sunningas. The Surrey hundreds of Chertsey and Woking correspond to the earlier territory of the Woccingas.

The defined territories of regiones also formed the basis for later ecclesiastic geography. Conversion to christianity was frequently followed by the establishment of a minster for the regiones, with the boundaries of the regiones territory frequently defining the minster parishes which the minsters served.

== Bibliography ==
- Bailey, Keith (1989), "The Middle Saxons", in Bassett, Steven (ed.), The Origins of Anglo-Saxon Kingdoms, Leicester: Leicester University Press, pp. 108–122, ISBN 0718513177
- Bassett, Steven (1989), "In search of the origins of Anglo-Saxon Kingdoms", in Bassett, Steven (ed.), The Origins of Anglo-Saxon Kingdoms, Leicester: Leicester University Press, pp. 3–27, ISBN 0718513177
- Campbell, James (2008), "A Nearly, but Wrongly, Forgotten Historian of the Dark Ages", in Barrow, Julia; Wareham, Andrew (eds.), Myth, Rulership, Church and Charters: Essays in Honour of Nicholas Brooks, Aldershot: Ashgate Publishing, pp. 31–44, ISBN 0754651207
- Charles-Edwards, Thomas (1989), "Early medieval kingships in the British Isles", in Bassett, Steven (ed.), The Origins of Anglo-Saxon Kingdoms, Leicester: Leicester University Press, pp. 28–39, ISBN 0718513177
- Faith, Rosamond (1999), The English Peasantry and the Growth of Lordship, Leicester: Leicester University Press, ISBN 0718502043
- Rippon, Stephen (2012), Making Sense of an Historic Landscape, Oxford: Oxford University Press, ISBN 0199533784
- Stenton, Frank (1971), Anglo-Saxon England (third ed.), Oxford: Oxford University Press (published 1989)
- Thornton, David E. (2009), "Communities and Kinship", in Stafford, Pauline (ed.), A Companion to the Early Middle Ages: Britain and Ireland c.500-1100, London: John Wiley & Sons, pp. 91–106, ISBN 1444311018
- Williamson, Tom (2013), Environment, Society and Landscape in Early Medieval England: Time and Topography, Woodbridge: Boydell Press, ISBN 1843837374
- Yorke, Barbara (1995), Wessex in the early Middle Ages, Leicester University Press, ISBN 071851856X
