= Readingas =

The Readingas (Old English Rēadingas) were a tribe or clan of early Anglo-Saxon England whose capital was Reading; their territory formed a regio or administrative subdivision of the early Kingdom of Wessex. The area of the Readingas adjoined that of the Sunningas to the east and that of the Basingas to the south. The subdivision retained a role beyond the Anglo-Saxon period as Reading remained the administrative center for a distinctive grouping of hundreds within Berkshire throughout the Middle Ages.

The name may have been taken from a personal name and mean "Rēada's people", or it may be based on a topographical root and mean "The people of the red [one]".

== Bibliography ==
- Yorke, Barbara (1995), Wessex in the early Middle Ages, Continuum International Publishing Group, ISBN 0-7185-1856-X
