= Minster hypothesis =

The minster hypothesis is a debated view that the organisation of the early Anglo-Saxon Christian church was based around minsters staffed by communities of clerics and providing spiritual services within a defined area (known as a parochia).

== The underlying ideas ==
John Blair put forward a description of the early Anglo-Saxon Christian church in England in a number of publications. He believed that the organisation of the early church was based around minsters staffed by a community of clerics and providing spiritual services within a defined area (known as a parochia). Minsters were established close to royal vills, as part of the process by which pagan communities were converted to Christianity. During 10th and 11th centuries, parochial duties were increasingly taken over by estate churches which were the property of local land owners. The diminishing role for minsters and the emergence of estate churches accompanied the fragmentation of the Anglo-Saxon multiple estates that had been common in the earlier landscape. The new estate churches were frequently dependent to some extent on the original minster church within whose boundary they were located. Sonning (Berkshire) is an example of an original minster which by the 12th century had eight dependent churches, four of which had become independent parishes by the 15th century. Although minsters were in decline by 1086, it is still possible to identify them in Domesday wherever the description goes beyond the purely formulaic. Clues to identification of minsters include references to groups of priests; a church endowment exceeding one hide; tenure by a royal or named clerk; a separate valuation or survey or some additional sign of status.

== Etymology ==
Blair did not himself coin the phrase "minster hypothesis", instead using (but not coining) the phrase "minster model". The term "minster hypothesis" was first used in a critical review by Cambridge and Rollason. The term has subsequently been widely adopted by both proponents and opponents of the underlying ideas. The term "minster system" has sometimes been used as an alternative.

== Areas of dispute ==
Disputed points include

- the extent to which there was a deliberate and planned programme of establishing minsters to provide parochial services
- the extent to which private churches were numerous in the early Christian period
- whether or not all minsters had parochial duties
- the applicability of evidence from a later date to infer an earlier practice.
