= Food render =

Food render or food rent (Old English: foster) was a form of tax in kind (Old English: feorm) levied in Anglo-Saxon England, consisting of essential foodstuffs provided by territories such as regiones, multiple estates or hundreds to kings and other members of royal households at a territory's royal vill.

The early medieval British Isles lacked the sophisticated trade in essential foodstuffs that had supported the urban economies of Roman Britain, and which would be necessary to support large agriculturally unproductive households remaining static in a single location. Kings and their entourages therefore constantly toured the subdivisions of their kingdoms, staying at networks of royal properties where they could expect to be supported by the territory's inhabitants. In the words of historian Thomas Charles-Edwards: "it made much more sense to take a royal household to the food than the food to the royal household".

Food renders were distinct from the tribute that Kings extracted from other subjugated kingdoms. Food renders consisted of the varied range of foodstuffs that constituted a balanced diet and were consumed within the donor's territory. If the King or members of his household did not visit, the donor was freed from his obligations for the year. Kings did not routinely travel through subjugated kingdoms, however, and tribute extracted from such areas often took the form of livestock that could easily be transported to the dominant kingdom.

The late 7th century laws of Ine of Wessex list the food render expected of an estate of ten hides as "10 vats of honey, 300 loaves, 12 ambers of Welsh ale, 30 ambers of clear ale, 2 full-grown cows or 10 wethers, 10 geese, 20 hens, 10 cheeses, a full amber of butter, 5 salmon, 20 pounds in weight of fodder, and 100 eels." Grazing would also have been made available for visitors' mounts.

Customary food renders in England declined through the twelfth and thirteenth centuries as currency became more readily available. Eel-rents, however, were collected in large numbers at least through the fourteenth century, and in smaller numbers throughout the later Middle Ages. The last active eel rents appear in records from the seventeenth century.

== Bibliography ==
- Charles-Edwards, Thomas (1989), "Early medieval kingships in the British Isles", in Bassett, Steven (ed.), The Origins of Anglo-Saxon Kingdoms, Leicester: Leicester University Press, pp. 28–39, ISBN 0718513177
- Dyer, Christopher (2001), Everyday Life in Medieval England, London: A&C Black, ISBN 0826419828
- Faith, Rosamund (2013), "Feorm", in Lapidge, Michael; Blair, John; Keynes, Simon; et al. (eds.), The Wiley Blackwell Encyclopedia of Anglo-Saxon England, London: John Wiley & Sons, pp. 186–187, ISBN 978-1118316092
- Greenlee, John Wyatt (n.d.), "English Eel Rents: 10th - 17th Centuries", Historia Cartarum
- Lavelle, Ryan (2013), "Ine 70.1 and Royal Provision in Anglo-Saxon Wessex", in Owen-Crocker, Gale R.; Schneider, Brian W. (eds.), Kingship, Legislation and Power in Anglo-Saxon England, Woodbridge: Boydell & Brewer, pp. 259–274, ISBN 978-1843838777
