= Sunningas =

The Sunningas were a tribe or clan of early Anglo-Saxon England, whose territory formed a regio or administrative subdivision of the early Kingdom of Wessex. The Sunningas inhabited Sonning and its environs, in the modern county of Berkshire; their territory adjoined that of the Readingas, centered on Reading to the west, and the Basingas, whose capital was Basingstoke, to the south. The subdivision retained a role beyond the Anglo-Saxon period as Sonning remained the administrative centre for a distinctive grouping of hundreds throughout the Middle Ages.
