= Shire court =

Anglo-Saxon legal institution

A shire court or shire moot was an Anglo-Saxon government institution, used to maintain law and order at a local level, and perform various administrative functions, including the collection of taxes for the central government.

The system originated in Wessex, then expanded to other parts of England. Although retained after the 1066 Norman Conquest, it gradually lost its power, before the shire courts were formally abolished by the County Courts Act 1846.

== Purpose and membership ==
Headed by an Earl, it was composed of local magnates, both secular and spiritual, who sat in council for the shire; also present was the county sheriff, or shire-reeve, who, after the conquest, became the king's representative. Thereafter it appears courts were headed by the local bishop, who determined the result, while the sheriff ensured it was carried out.

Most legal issues, including theft or murder, were managed by tithing and hundred courts in the south, or wapentakes in the northern shires. The shire court primarily dealt with civil issues, such as land disputes, and met at least twice a year, acting as a Court of Appeal; an issue had to have been rejected three times by a hundred court before it was passed up to the shire court.

Using multiple courts often led to arguments over jurisdiction, that delayed legal resolution; in addition to those of the hundreds, these included borough. It was possible for a wealthy and determined individual to delay judgement almost indefinitely, but few were powerful enough to do so regularly.

The practice originated in Wessex, then gradually expanded into the rest of England; a similar model was used in Wales, particularly after the 1284 Statute of Rhuddlan, although some unique Welsh practices were retained.

Another important function was collecting taxes for central government. Outside urban areas, Anglo-Saxon England was a non-cash economy, based on barter, or in kind payments. The process monetised taxes paid in goods or food lower down, with the members of the court then responsible for converting it into coin.

== Decline and abolishment ==
The courts remained in place after the 1066 Norman Conquest, but lost their jurisdiction over the church; in return for papal support, William the Conqueror established separate ecclesiastical courts. Over the next century, criminal justice was gradually transferred to the Crown, starting with the Curia regis; by 1278, shire courts only tried civil cases under 40 shillings (2 pounds sterling). They continued in existence until abolished by the County Courts Act 1846.

In middle and later mediaeval times the local criminal courts were presided over by a local justice of the peace, appointed by the monarch. These developed into magistrates' courts. Higher criminal courts included commissions of trailbaston and forest courts presided over by a justice in eyre from the time of Henry II. These itinerant justices of the high court travelled around one of six eyres or regional court circuits, and by 1234 under Henry III the system had developed into the Court of King's Bench permanently based in Westminster Hall. Justices of the King's Bench were appointed by letters patent to commissions of gaol delivery and oyer and terminer which sat at assizes; these generally took place in county courts every six months in county towns during the Hilary and Trinity vacations.

== See also ==
- Court of piepowders
- English criminal law
- Government in medieval England
- History of the courts of England and Wales
- Manorial court

== Sources ==
- Powell, Edward (1988). "Jury Trial at Gaol Delivery in the late Middle Ages: The Midland Circuit, 1400-29". In Cockburn, J. S.; Green, Thomas A. (eds.). Twelve Good Men and True: The Criminal Trial Jury in England, 1200-1800. Princeton University Press. ISBN 0691055114.
- Shepperson, Tessa. "A Confusion of Courts". History of Law.
- Thompson, George Jarvis (1931). "Development of the Anglo-American Judicial System". Cornell Law Review. 17 (1).
- Wareham, Andrew (2012). "Fiscal policies and the institution of a tax state in Anglo-Saxon England within a comparative context". The Economic History Review. 65 (3): 910–931. doi:10.1111/j.1468-0289.2011.00624.x. hdl:10.1111/j.1468-0289.2011.00624.x. JSTOR 23271556. S2CID 154521348.
- Zinkeisen, Frank (1895). "The Anglo-Saxon Courts of Law". Political Science Quarterly. 10 (1): 132–144. doi:10.2307/2139582. JSTOR 2139582.
