= Jus antiquum =

Period in the legal history of the Catholic Church

Jus antiquum is a period in the legal history of the Catholic Church, spanning from the beginning of the church to the Decretum of Gratian, i.e. from A.D. 33 to around 1150. In the first 10 centuries of the church, there was a great proliferation of canonical collections, mostly assembled by private individuals and not by church authority as such.

== Ancient Church Orders ==
At no time, and least of all during the earliest centuries, was there any attempt to draw up a uniform system of legislation for the whole of the Christian Church. The various communities ruled themselves principally according to their customs and traditions, which, however, possessed a certain uniformity resulting from their close connexion with natural and divine law. Strangely enough, those documents which bear the greatest resemblance to a small collection of canonical regulations, such as the Didache, the Didascalia and the Canons of Hippolytus, have not been retained, and find no place in the collections of canons, doubtless for the reason that they were not official documents. Even the Apostolic Constitutions (q.v.), an expansion of the Didache and the Didascalia, after exercising a certain amount of influence, were rejected by the council in Trullo (692).

Thus the only pseudo-epigraphic document preserved in the law of the Greek Church is the small collection of the eighty-five so-called "Apostolic Canons" (q.v.). The compilers, in their several collections, gathered only occasional decisions, the outcome of no pre-determined plan, given by councils or by certain great bishops.

These compilations began in the East. It appears that in several different districts canons made by the local assemblies (Note: The councils which we are about to mention, up to the 9th century, have been published several times, notably in the great collections of Hardouin, Mansi, &c.; they will be found brought together in one small volume in Bruns, Canones apostolorum et conciliorum (Berlin, 1839).) were added to those of the council of Nicaea which were everywhere accepted and observed.

== In the East ==
=== Greek collection ===
The first example seems to be that of the province of Pontus, where after the twenty canons of Nicaea were placed the twenty-five canons of the council of Ancyra (314), and the fifteen of that of Neocaesarea (315–320). These texts were adopted at Antioch, where the twenty-five canons of the so-called council in encaeniis of that city were further added (341).

Soon afterward, Paphlagonia contributed twenty canons passed at the council of Gangra (held, according to the Synodicon orientale, in 343), (Note: The date of this council was formerly unknown; it is ascribed to 343 by the Syriac Nestorian collection recently published by M. Chabot, Synodicon Orientale, p. 278, note 4.) and Phrygia fifty-nine canons of the assembly of Laodicea (345–381?), or rather of the compilation known as the work of this council. The collection was so well and so widely known that all these canons were numbered in sequence, and thus at the Council of Chalcedon (451) several of the canons of Antioch were read out under the number assigned to them in the collection of the whole. It was further increased by the twenty-eight (thirty) canons of Chalcedon; about the same time were added the four canons of the council of Constantinople of 381, under the name of which also appeared three (or seven) other canons of a later date. Towards the same date, also, the so-called Apostolic Canons were placed at the head of the group. Such was the condition of the Greek collection when it was translated and introduced into the West.

In the course of the 6th century the collection was completed by the addition of documents already in existence, but which had hitherto remained isolated, notably the canonical letters of several great bishops, Dionysius of Alexandria, St Basil and others. It was at this time that the Latin collection of Dionysius Exiguus became known; and just as he had given the Greek councils a place in his collection, so from him were borrowed the canons of councils which did not appear in the Greek collection—the twenty canons of Sardica (343), in the Greek text, which differs considerably from the Latin; and the council of Carthage of 410, which itself included, more or less completely, in 105 canons, the decisions of the African councils. Soon after came the council in Trullo (692), also called the Quinisextum, because it was considered as complementary to the two councils (5th and 6th ecumenical) of Constantinople (553 and 680), which had not made any disciplinary canons. This assembly elaborated 102 canons, which did not become part of the Western law till much later, on the initiative of Pope John VIII.(872–881).

=== Final form ===
Now, in the second of its canons, the council in Trullo recognized and sanctioned the Greek collection above mentioned; it enumerates all its articles, insists on the recognition of these canons, and at the same time prohibits the addition of others. As thus defined, the collection contains the following documents: firstly, the eighty-five Apostolic Canons, the Constitutions having been put aside as having suffered heretical alterations; secondly, the canons of the councils of Nicaea, Ancyra, Neocaesarea, Gangra, Antioch, Laodicea, Constantinople (381), Ephesus (the disciplinary canons of this council deal with the reception of the Nestorians, and were not communicated to the West), Chalcedon, Sardica, Carthage (that of 419, according to Dionysius), Constantinople (394); thirdly, the series of canonical letters of the following great bishops—Dionysius of Alexandria, Peter of Alexandria (the Martyr), Gregory Thaumaturgus, Athanasius, Basil of Caesarea, Gregory of Nyssa, Gregory of Nazianzus, Amphilochius of Iconium, Timotheus of Alexandria, Pope Theophilus of Alexandria, Cyril of Alexandria, and Gennadius of Constantinople; the canon of Cyprian of Carthage (the Martyr) is also mentioned, but with the note that it is only valid for Africa. With the addition of the twenty-two canons of the ecumenical council of Nicaea (787), this will give us the whole contents of the official collection of the Greek Church; since then it has remained unchanged. The law of the Greek Church was in reality rather the work of the Byzantine emperors.

=== Nomocanon ===
The collection has had several commentators; we need only mention the commentaries of Photius (883), Zonaras (1120) and Balsamon (1170). A collection in which the texts are simply reproduced in their chronological order is obviously inconvenient; towards 550, Johannes Scholasticus, patriarch of Constantinople, drew up a methodical classification of them under fifty heads. Finally should be mentioned yet another kind of compilation still in use in the Greek Church, bearing the name of nomocanon, because in them are inserted, side by side with the ecclesiastical canons, the imperial laws on each subject: the chief of them are the one bearing the name of John Scholasticus, which belongs, however, to a later date, and that of Photius (883).

== In the West ==
The canon law of the other Eastern Churches had no marked influence on the collections of the Western Church, so we need not speak of it here. From the 5th century onwards, a certain unification in the ecclesiastical law began to take place within the sphere of the see of Constantinople, but it was not till later that a similar result arrived in the West. For several centuries there is no mention of any but local collections of canons, and even these are not found till the 5th century; we have to come down to the 8th or even the 9th century before we find any trace of unification. This process was uniformly the result of the passing on of the various collections from one region to another.

=== North African collections ===
The most remarkable, and the most homogeneous, as well as without doubt the most ancient of these local collections is that of the Church of Africa. It was formed, so to speak, automatically, owing to the plenary assemblies of the African episcopate held practically every year, at which it was customary first of all to read out the canons of the previous councils. This gave to the collection an official character. At the time of the Vandal invasion this collection comprised the canons of the council of Carthage under Gratus (about 348) and under Genethlius (390), the whole series of the twenty or twenty-two plenary councils held during the episcopate of Aurelius, and finally, those of the councils held at Byzacene. Of the last-named we have only fragments, and the series of the councils under Aurelius is very incomplete. The African collection has not come to us directly: we have two incomplete and confused arrangements of it, in two collections, that of the Hispana and that of Dionysius Exiguus. Dionysius knows only the council of 419, in connexion with the affair of Apiarius; but in this single text are reproduced, more or less fully, almost all the synods of the collection; this was the celebrated Concilium Africanum, so often quoted in the Middle Ages, which was also recognized by the Greeks. The Spanish collection divides the African canons among seven councils of Carthage and one of Mileve; but in many cases it ascribes them to the wrong source; for example, it gives under the title of the fourth council of Carthage, the Statuta Ecclesiae antiqua, an Arlesian compilation of Saint Caesarius, which has led to a number of incorrect references. Towards the middle of the 6th century a Carthaginian deacon, Fulgentius Ferrandus, drew up a Breviatio canonum, (Note: Edited by Pierre Pithou (Paris, 1588), and later by Chifflet, Fulg. Ferrandi opera (Dijon, 1694); reproduced in Migne, Patr. Lat. vol. 67, col. 949.) a methodical arrangement of the African collection, in the order of the subjects. From it we learn that the canons of Nicaea and the other Greek councils, up to that of Chalcedon, were also known in Africa.

=== Rome ===
The Roman Church, even more than the rest, governed itself according to its own customs and traditions. Up to the end of the 5th century the only canonical document of non-Roman origin which it officially recognized was the group of canons of Nicaea, under which name were also included those of Sardica. A Latin version of the other Greek councils (the one referred to by Dionysius as prisca) was known, but no canonical use was made of it. The local law was founded on usage and on the papal letters called decretals. The latter were of two kinds: some were addressed to the bishops of the ecclesiastical province immediately subject to the pope; the others were issued in answer to questions submitted from various quarters; but in both cases the doctrine is the same.

=== Dionysius Exiguus and his collection ===
At the beginning of the 6th century the Roman Church adopted the double collection, though of private origin, which was drawn up at that time by the monk Dionysius, known by the name of Dionysius Exiguus, which he himself had assumed as a sign of humility. He was a Scythian by birth, and did not come to Rome till after 496, his learning was considerable for his times, and to him we owe the employment of the Christian era and a new way of reckoning Easter. At the desire of Stephen, bishop of Salona, he undertook the task of making a new translation, from the original Greek text, of the canons of the Greek collection. The manuscript which he used contained only the first fifty of the Apostolic Canons; these he translated, and they thus became part of the law of the West. This part of the work of Dionysius was not added to later; it was otherwise with the second part. This embodied the documents containing the local law, namely 39 decretals of the popes from Siricius (384–398) to Anastasius II. (496–498). As was natural this collection received successive additions as further decretals appeared. The collection formed by combining these two parts remained the only official code of the Roman Church until the labours undertaken in consequence of the reforming movement in the 11th century.

=== Dionysio-Hadriana ===
In 774 Pope Adrian I. gave the twofold collection of the Scythian monk to the future emperor Charlemagne as the canonical book of the Roman Church; this is what is called the Dionysio-Hadriana. This was an important stage in the history of the centralization of canon law; the collection was officially received by the Frankish Church, imposed by the council of Aix-la-Chapelle of 802, and from that time on was recognized and quoted as the liber canonum. If we consider that the Church of Africa, which had already suffered considerably from the Vandal invasion, was at this period almost entirely destroyed by the Arabs, while the fate of Spain was but little better, it is easy to see why the collection of Dionysius became the code of almost the whole of the Western Church, with the exception of the Anglo-Saxon countries; though here too it was known.

The other collections of canons, of Italian origin, compiled before the 10th century, are of importance on account of the documents which they have preserved for us, but as they have not exercised any great influence on the development of canon law, we may pass them over.

=== In Gaul ===
The Dionysio-Hadriana did not, when introduced into Gaul, take the place of any other generally received collection of canons. In this country the Church had not been centralized round a principal see which would have produced unity in canon law as in other things; even the political territorial divisions had been very unstable. The only canonical centre of much activity was the Church of Arles, which exercised considerable influence over the surrounding region in the 5th and 6th centuries.

==== Quesnel collection ====
The chief collection known throughout Gaul before the Dionysio-Hadriana was the so-called collection of Quesnel, named after its first editor. (Note: Published by Quesnel in his edition of the works of St Leo, vol. ii. (Paris, 1675); reproduced by the brothers Ballerini, with learned dissertations, Opera S. Leonis, vol. iii., Migne, P.L. 56.) It is a rich collection, though badly arranged, and contains 98 documents—Eastern and African canons and papal letters, but no Gallic councils; so that it is not a collection of local law.

=== Local councils ===
It would be impossible to enumerate here all the Gallic councils which contributed towards the canon law of that country; we will mention only the following:—Arles (314), of great importance; a number of councils in the district of Arles, completed by the Statuta Ecclesiae antiqua of St Caesarius; the councils of the province of Tours; the assemblies of the episcopate of the three kingdoms of the Visigoths at Agde (506), of the Franks at Orleans (511), and of the Burgundians at Epaone (517); several councils of the kingdoms of the Franks, chiefly at Orleans; and finally, the synods of the middle of the 8th century, under the influence of St Boniface. Evidently the impulse towards unity had to come from without; it began with the alliance between the Carolingians and the Papacy, and was accentuated by the recognition of the liber canonum.

=== In Spain ===
In Spain the case, on the contrary, is that of a strong centralization round the see of Toledo. Thus we find Spanish canon law embodied in a collection which, though perhaps not official, was circulated and received everywhere; this was the Spanish collection, the Hispana.

==== The Hispana ====
The collection is well put together and includes almost all the important canonical documents. In the first part are contained the councils, arranged according to the regions in which they were held: Greek councils, following a translation of Italian origin but known by the name of Hispana; African councils, Gallican councils and Spanish councils. The latter, which form the local section, are further divided into several classes: firstly, the synods held under the Roman empire, the chief being that of Elvira (c. 300); next the texts belonging to the kingdom of the Suevi, after the conversion of these barbarians by St Martin of Braga: these are, the two councils of Braga (563 and 572), and a sort of free translation or adaptation of the canons of the Greek councils, made by Martin of Braga; this is the document frequently quoted in later days under the name of Capitula Martini papae; thirdly, the decisions of the councils of the Visigothic Church, after its conversion to Catholicism. Nearly all these councils were held at Toledo, beginning with the great council of 589. The series continued up to 694 and was only interrupted by the Mussulman invasion. Finally, the second part of the Hispana contains the papal decretals, as in the collection of Dionysius.

From the middle of the 9th century this collection was to become even more celebrated; for, as we know, it served as the basis for the famous collection of the False Decretals.

=== Great Britain and Ireland ===
The Churches of Great Britain and Ireland remained still longer outside the centralizing movement. Their contribution towards the later system of canon law consisted in two things: the Penitentials and the influence of the Irish collection, the other sources of local law not having been known to the predecessors of Gratian nor to Gratian himself.

==== Penitentials ====
The Penitentials are collections intended for the guidance of confessors in estimating the penances to be imposed for various sins, according to the discipline in force in the Anglo-Saxon countries. They are all of Anglo-Saxon or Irish origin, and although certain of them were compiled on the continent, under the influence of the island missionaries, it seems quite certain that a Roman Penitential has never existed. (Note: This is proved, in spite of the contrary opinions of Wasserschleben and Schmitz, by M. Paul Fournier, "Étude sur les Pénitentiels", in the Revue d’histoire et de littérature religieuses, vol. vi. (1901), pp. 289–317, and vol. vii., 1902, pp. 59–70 and 121–127.) They are, however, of difficult and uncertain ascription, since the collections have been largely amended and remodelled as practice required. Among the most important we may mention those bearing the names of Vinnianus (d. 589), Gildas (d. 583), Theodore of Canterbury (d. 690), the Venerable Bede (d. 735) and Egbert of York (732–767); the Penitentials which are ascribed to St Columbanus, the founder of Luxeuil and Bobbio (d. 615), and Cumean (Cumine Ailbha, abbot of Iona); in the Prankish kingdom the most interesting work is the Penitential of Halitgar, bishop of Cambrai from 817 to 831. As penances had for a long time been lightened, and the books used by confessors began to consist more and more of instructions in the style of the later moral theology (and this is already the case of the books of Halitgar and Rhabanus Maurus), the canonical collections began to include a greater or smaller number of the penitential canons.

==== Irish collection ====
The Irish collection, (Note: Edited by Wasserschleben (Giessen, 1874). See also P. Fournier, "De l’influence de la collection irlandaise sur la formation des collections canoniques", in Nouvelle Revue historique de droit français et étranger, vol. xxiii, note I.) though it introduced no important documents into the law of the Western Church, at least set canonists the example of quoting passages from the Scriptures and the writings of the Fathers. This collection seems to date from the 8th century; besides the usual sources, the author has included several documents of local origin, beginning with the pretended synod of St Patrick.

=== The false decretals ===
In the very middle of the 9th century a much enlarged edition of the Hispana began to be circulated in France. To this rich collection the author, who assumes the name of Isidore, the saintly bishop of Seville, added a good number of apocryphal documents already existing, as well as a series of letters ascribed to the popes of the earliest centuries, from Clement to Silvester and Damasus inclusive, thus filling up the gap before the decretal of Siricius, which is the first genuine one in the collection. The other papal letters only rarely show signs of alteration or falsification, and the text of the councils is entirely respected. (Note: The collection of the False Decretals has been published with a long critical introduction by P. Hinschius, Decretales Pseudo-Isidorianae et capitula Angilramni (Leipzig, 1863). For more information, see Pseudo-Isidorian Decretals.) From the same source and at the same date came two other forged documents—firstly, a collection of Capitularies, in three books, ascribed to a certain Benedict (Benedictus Levita), (Note: The latest edition is in Pertz, Monumenta Germaniae, vol. ii. part ii.) a deacon of the church of Mainz; this collection, in which authentic documents find very little place, stands with regard to civil legislation exactly in the position of the False Decretals with regard to canon law. The other document, of more limited scope, is a group of Capitula given under the name of Angilram, bishop of Metz. It is nowadays admitted by all that these three collections come from the same source. For a study of the historical questions connected with the famous False Decretals, see the article Pseudo-Isidorian Decretals; here we have only to consider them with reference to the place they occupy in the formation of ecclesiastical law. In spite of some hesitation, with regard rather to the official character than to the historical authenticity of the letters attributed to the popes of the earlier centuries, the False Decretals were accepted with confidence, together with the authentic texts which served as a passport for them. All later collections availed themselves indiscriminately of the contents of this vast collection, whether authentic or forged, without the least suspicion. The False Decretals did not greatly modify nor corrupt the Canon Law, but they contributed much to accelerate its progress towards unity. For they were the last of the chronological collections, i.e. those which give the texts in the order in which they appeared. From this time on, canonists began to exercise their individual judgment in arranging their collections according to some systematic order, grouping their materials under divisions more or less happy, according to the object they had in view. This was the beginning of a codification of a common canon law, in which the sources drawn upon lose, as it were, their local character. This is made even more noticeable by the fact that, in a good number of the works extant, the author is not content merely to set forth and classify the texts; but he proceeds to discuss the point, drawing conclusions and sometimes outlining some controversy on the subject, just as Gratian was to do more fully later on.

=== Systematic collections ===
During this period, which extended from the end of the 9th century to the middle of the 12th, we can enumerate about forty systematic collections, of varying value and circulation, which all played a greater or lesser part in preparing the juridical renaissance of the 12th century, and most of which were utilized by Gratian.

==== Regino ====
We need mention only the chief of them—the Collectio Anselmo dedicata, by an unknown author of the end of the 9th century; the Libri duo de synodalibus causis et disciplinis ecclesiasticis, (Note: Edited by Wasserschleben (Leipzig, 1840); reproduced by Migne, P.L. 132.) compiled about 906 by Regino, abbot of Prüm, and dedicated to Hatto of Mainz, relatively a very original treatise.

==== Burchard ====
The enormous compilation in twenty books of Burchard, bishop of Worms (1112–1122), the Decretum or Collectarium, (Note: Edited several times; in Migne, P.L. 140.) very widely spread and known under the name of Brocardum, of which the 19th book, dealing with the process of confession, is specially noteworthy. Towards the end of the 11th century, under the influence of Hildebrand, the reforming movement makes itself felt in several collections of canons, intended to support the rights of the Holy See and the Church against the pretensions of the emperor. To this group belong an anonymous collection, described by M. P. Fournier as the first manual of the Reform.

==== Anselm Deusdedit ====
The collection of Anselm, bishop of Lucca, (Note: Unpublished) in 13 books (1080–1086); that of Cardinal Deusdedit, (Note: Edited by Mgr. Pio Martinucci (Venice, 1869). On this collection see Wolf von Glanvell, Die Kanonessammlung des Kardinals Deusdedit (Paderborn, 1905).) in 4 books, dedicated to Pope Victor III. (1086–1087); and lastly that of Bonizo, (Note: Unpublished.) bishop of Sutri, in 10 books (1089).

==== Ivo of Chartres ====
In the 12th century, the canonical works of Ivo of Chartres (Note: Several times edited; in Migne, P.L. 161. See P. Fournier, "Les Collections canoniques attribuées à Yves de Chartres", Bibliothèque de l’École des Chartres (1896 and 1897).) are of great importance. His Panormia, compiled about 1095 or 1096, is a handy and well-arranged collection in 8 books; as to the Decretum, a weighty compilation in 17 books, there seems sufficient proof that it is a collection of material made by Ivo in view of his Panormia. To the 12th century belong the collection in the MS. of Saragossa (Caesaraugustana) to which attention was drawn by Antonio Agustin; that of Cardinal Gregory, called by him the Polycarpus, in 8 books (about 1115); and finally the Liber de misericordia et justitia of Algerus, (Note: Printed in Martene, Nov. Thesaur. anecdot. vol. v. col. 1019.) scholasticus of Liége, in 3 books, compiled at latest in 1123.

But all these works were to be superseded by the Decretum of Gratian, who by his work would inaugurate what would become known as the Jus novum period of the history of canon law.
