= Anglo-Saxon multiple estate =

Historical multi-settlement landholdings

An Anglo-Saxon multiple estate was a large landholding controlled from a central location with surrounding subsidiary settlements. These estates were present in the early Anglo-Saxon period, but fragmented into smaller units in the late Anglo-Saxon period. Despite some academic criticism, the concept has been widely used and a large number of possible examples have been proposed.

== Definition ==
The concept of an Anglo-Saxon multiple estate was developed by Professor Glanville Jones of Leeds University. The idea originally appeared in a paper published in 1961 and was fleshed out in a 1976 book on medieval settlement. The term "great estate" is sometimes used as an alternative to multiple estate. These estates typically contained various features:

- a central caput from which the estate was managed
- a minster church providing parochial support to the whole estate
- surrounding agricultural settlements specialising in particular crops.

The specialised settlements, dependent on the caput, often took their name from the crop they produced – Cheswick (cheese wick), Berwick (barley farm), etc. The caput has been variously described as a villa regalis, aula, mansio, or maerdref. Specialisation may have been encouraged by "renders" – taxation in kind – paid to the king.

These estates may have been based around a royal vill and may have been coterminous with the parochia of an early minster church.

== Chronology ==
The origin of some of these estates has been traced back to Roman times or earlier – for example, H. P. R. Finberg proposed a Roman origin for Withington, Gloucestershire, while Glanville Jones himself suggested a pre-Roman origin for some estates These multiple estates were a common feature in the English landscape before the 10th century and were usually owned by the king or an important monastery. In the late Anglo-Saxon period, many of these large estates fragmented into smaller units which eventually became independent parishes. The resultant parishes frequently share the same name differentiated by a suffix or prefix. The fragmentation of these estates resulted in the diminishing importance of their minster churches which (under the "minster hypothesis") had been the basis of early Christian church organisation.

== Academic status ==
The concept has been criticised – for example, because the evidence used is often much later than the date of the proposed estate. Nonetheless, the concept is widely used and a large number of possible examples have been proposed.
