= Bryce Lyon =

American historian

Bryce Dale Lyon (April 22, 1920 – 2007) was an American medievalist who taught at the University of Colorado, Harvard University, the University of Illinois, the University of California at Berkeley and Brown University. By the end of his career, Lyon wrote, co-authored, or edited over twenty books; published over fifty scholarly articles; and wrote over one hundred book reviews.

== Early life and education ==
Bryce Dale Lyon was born April 22, 1920, in Bellevue, Ohio, to E. Paul Lyon and Florence Gundrum. Life in Bellevue explained Lyon's interest in economic history. Bellevue was a railroad town serviced by the Mad River & Lake Erie Railroad, the Toledo-Norwalk Railroad, the Nickel Plate Railroad, the Wheeling & Lake Erie Railroad and the Pennsylvania Railroad. These railroads connected Bellevue with Cleveland and Toledo, enabling trade and commerce in Bellevue. The wealth of Bellevue contributed to the creation of Standard Oil.

In 1942 Lyon obtained a B.A. in history, graduating summa cum laude from Baldwin-Wallace College in Berea, Ohio. World War II delayed Lyon's goal to obtain a Ph.D. in history. World War II also delayed Lyon's marriage to Mary Elizabeth Lewis, a fellow student at Baldwin-Wallace. Mary was the perfect personal and professional companion, having majored in classics and possessing a keen grasp of Latin. As Lyon's career progressed, Mary transitioned from typist and editor to co-researcher and co-author.

In June 1946, Lyon and his wife Mary moved to Ithaca, New York, to attend Cornell University for his Ph.D. in history. The luminaries at Cornell University allowed Lyon to pursue both ancient and medieval history. Professor Carl Stephenson, an eminent medievalist, became Lyon's thesis director. Lyon also received a minor in ancient history with Professor M.L.W. Laistner and a minor in political theory with Professor George H. Sabine.

Professor Stephenson introduced Lyon to Henri Pirenne's writings. Henri Pirenne, a renowned Belgian medieval historian, theorized the Roman Empire ended when subsistence living replaced trade. Pirenne believed trade first reappeared in the Low Countries. According to Pirenne, this trade explains why many institutions from Middle Ages started in the Low Countries. Building upon Pirenne's theories, Stephenson suggested Lyon write his thesis on feudalism. Lyon narrowed his thesis to The Money Fief Under the English Kings, 1066-1485.

== Career ==
After earning his Ph.D. from Cornell University in 1949, Lyon accepted a position in the history department at the University of Colorado. S. Harrison Thomson, the chair of the department of history, greeted Lyon, saying: “You will be gone within three years. Either you will publish yourself out of Colorado or I will fire you.” Lyon taught medieval history at University of Colorado from 1949 through 1951.

In 1952, Lyon received a fellowship to work in Belgium. Lyon found material in the Belgian archives to revise his thesis on the transition from feudal to non-feudal contracts in England and the Low Countries during the late Middle Ages. The book emerging from this research defined Lyon's career.

While in Belgium, Lyon accepted a position as an assistant professor of history at Harvard University, a position he held from 1951 to 1956. Lyon received this offer largely based on his thesis he revised in Belgium, From Fief to Indenture: The Transition from Feudal to Non-Feudal Contract in Western Europe. In 1954 Lyon compiled and edited a volume of Carl Stephenson's finest articles, Medieval Institutions: Selected Essays by Carl Stephenson, to recognize his mentor's scholarly career.

From 1956 to 1959, Lyon was an associate professor of history at the University of Illinois. Together with other professors from the department of history at Illinois, Lyon co-wrote A History of the World' in 1960. Additionally, Lyon wrote "The Middle Ages in Recent Historical Thought" published in 1959. During this time, Lyon also began his book entitled A Constitutional and Legal History of Medieval England published in 1960. Lyon recognized trade required a mature legal system.

From 1959 through 1965, Lyon was a professor of history at the University of California at Berkeley. Lyon also served as assistant dean to the College of Arts and Sciences from 1959 through 1965. While at Berkeley, Lyon revised Medieval History, Europe from the Second to the Sixteenth Century by Carl Stephenson.

From 1965 until his retirement in 1986, Lyon was the Barnaby C. and Mary Critchfield Keeney Professor of History at Brown University in Providence, RI. Lyon also chaired the department of history at Brown University from 1968 through 1975. During this time, Lyon's notable books included: Medieval Finance. A Comparison of Financial Institutions in Northwestern Europe, A History of the Western World, Studies of West European Medieval Institutions, and The Emergence of Common Law and Parliament. While at Brown, Lyon also researched the life of Henri Pirenne and the Annales School of History. This research resulted in published editions of Pirenne's correspondence with Marc Bloch and Karl Lamprecht, a major article on Maurice Prou’s ties to Pirenne, and the biography entitled Henri Pirenne: A Biographical and Intellectual Study. Working as a team, Lyon and his wife, Mary, translated The Wardrobe Book of William de Norwell 12 July 1338 to 27 May 1340. Deciphering Latin abbreviations into full Latin, Lyon and his wife gave future scholars access to the account books of Edward III revealing his military, political, financial and logistical strategy during the Hundred Years’ War.

== Post-Retirement ==
Lyon and his wife translated another Wardrobe book, resulting in The Wardrobe Book of 1296-1297: A Financial and Logistical Record of Edward I’s 1297 Campaign in Flanders Against Philip IV of France. This work is a primary source of English diplomacy and logistics during the early stages of the Hundred Years’ War.

== Honors ==
- Doctor of Pedagogy, Baldwin-Wallace College.
- Fellowships from the John Simon Guggenheim Memorial Foundation
- Fellow of the American Academy of Arts and Sciences.
- Fellow of the Belgian Royal Historical Society
- Festschrift honoring Bryce Lyon's retirement: Law, Customs, and Social Fabric in Medieval Europe: Essays in Honor of Bryce Lyon [1990]
- Festschrift honoring Bryce Lyon's life: Comparative Perspectives on History and Historians: Essays in Memory of Bryce Lyon (1920–2007) [2012]
- Visiting Member, Institute for Advanced Study at Princeton
