= Minster (church) =

Honorific title given to particular churches in England

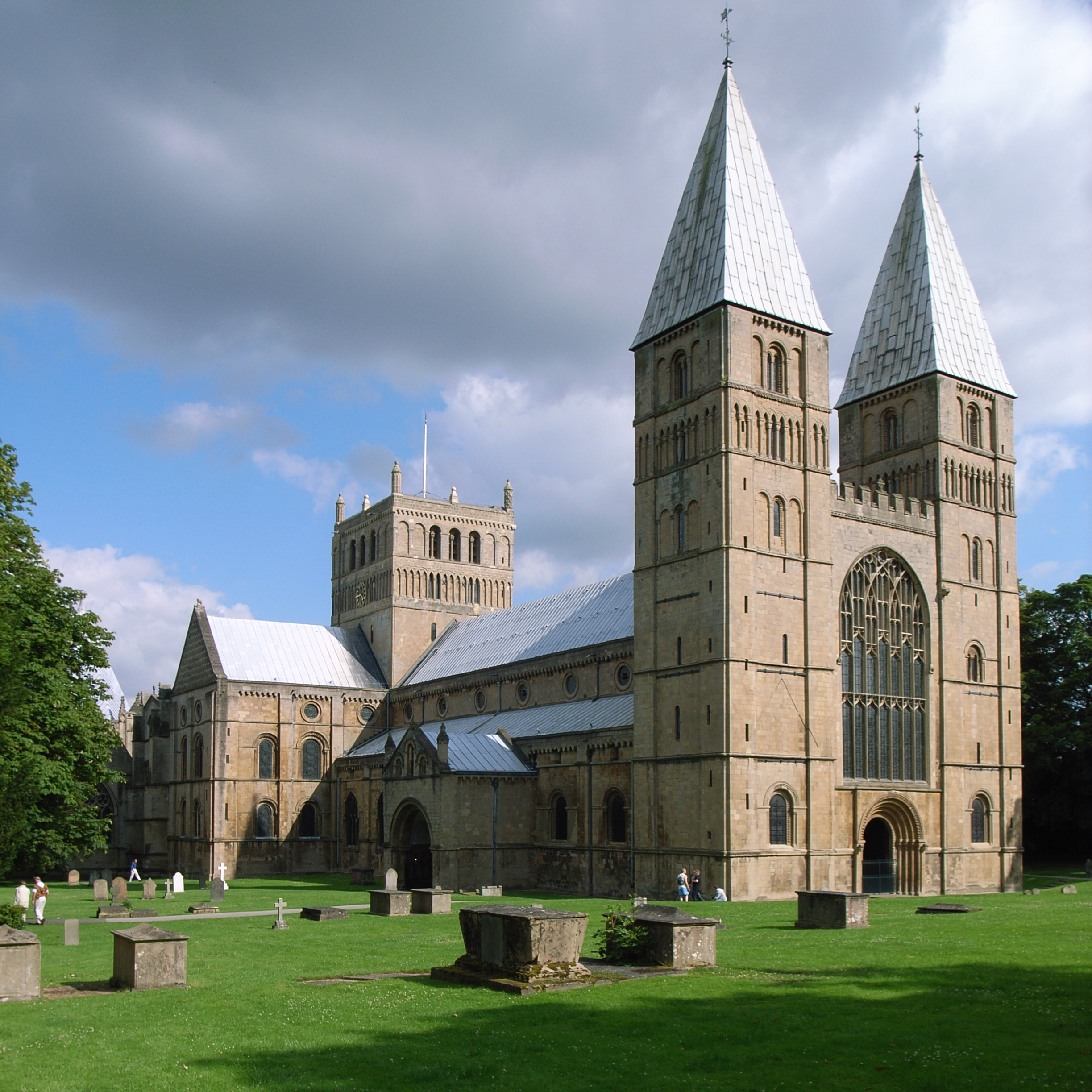
Southwell Minster

Minster is an honorific title given to particular churches in England and Wales, most notably York Minster in Yorkshire and Westminster Abbey in London.

The term minster is first found in royal foundation charters of the 7th century, when it designated any settlement of clergy living a communal life and endowed by charter with the obligation of maintaining the daily office of prayer. Widespread in 10th-century England, minsters declined in importance with the systematic introduction of parishes and parish churches from the 11th century onwards. The term continued as a title of dignity in later medieval England, in instances where a cathedral, monastery, collegiate church or parish church had originated with an Anglo-Saxon foundation.

Eventually, the word minster came to be applied occasionally in a more general way to "any large or important church, especially a collegiate or cathedral church". In the 21st century, the Church of England has designated certain parish churches as minsters by bestowing both the status of the name and defined responsibilities. Almost half of the minsters are found in the Yorkshire and the Humber region, with Dorset and Devon as other areas with many historic minsters.

The term also exists in German as "Münster" and is used mainly for Protestant churches. The German term can be used for some Roman Catholic churches, such as the Strasbourg Cathedral. Other Roman Catholic examples are Freiburg im Breisgau Cathedral (Freiburger Münster), Breisach parish church (Breisacher Münster), Aachen Cathedral (Aachener Münster, increasingly called Aachener Dom since it became a bishop's seat in 1930), the ancient cathedral of Konstanz (Konstanzer Münster), Essen Cathedral (superseded by Essener Dom since 1957), the parish churches of Neuss (St. Quirinus), Schwäbisch Gmünd and Ingolstadt, and many more.

== Etymology ==
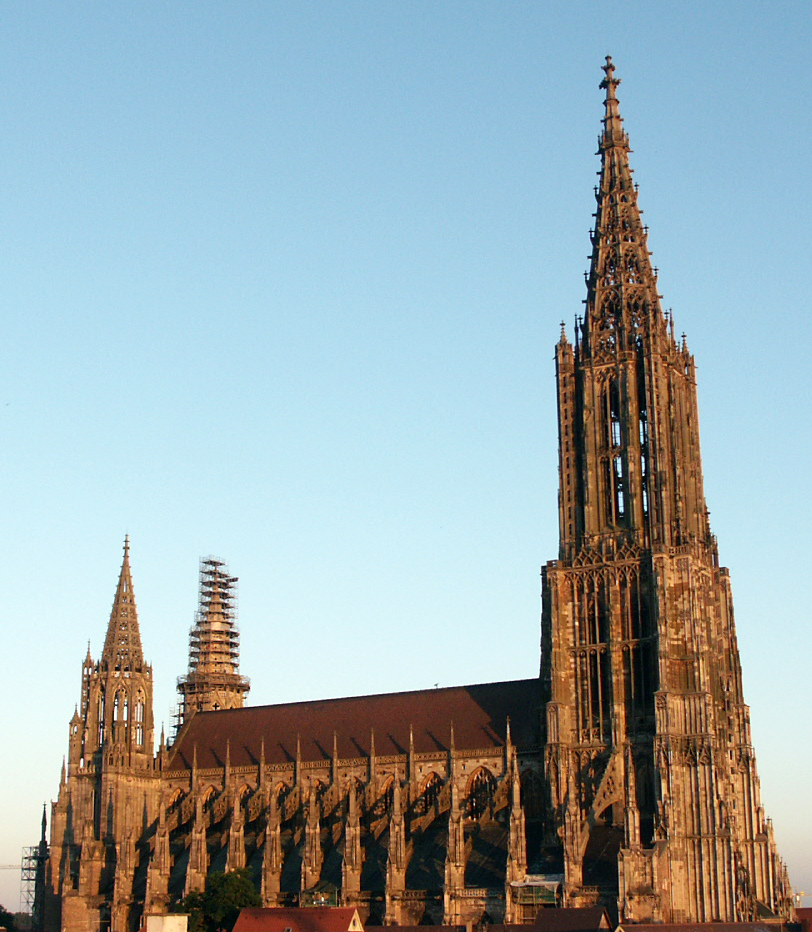
Ulm Minster in Germany, formerly the tallest church in the world (2003)

The word minster (Old English mynster) was a rendering of the Latin monasterium, from Greek "μοναστήριον" ("monasterion"). In early English sources, monasterium and mynster were used interchangeably. They were applied to all communities who had devoted their lives to Christian observance, regardless of the gender of the occupants or the activities in which said occupants typically engaged. Monasterium was for instance applied equally to a small community of men living away from other secular settlements, to a large community of men and women living in a planned enclosure designed around a church, and to a widow and her unmarried daughters living in seclusion.

The modern English term "monastery" does not express the same connotations as the Latin monasterium, from which it derives, or the Old English mynster. This is because the term has come to be associated with contemplative regularity, such as that observed by the Benedictine or Cistercian orders, although this does not apply to the situation in Anglo-Saxon England prior to the tenth century.

By the tenth century, a gradual distinction between a "church" and a "mynster" began to emerge. For instance, in the ‘Leechdoms’, the sixteenth day was propitious for establishing a mynster, and the sixth day of the moon for founding a church. This suggests that by the tenth and eleventh centuries, mynster was being used to refer to a "superior church" which was regarded as long-established and to which people paid their dues.

An early appearance was in the Ecclesiastical History of the Venerable Bede (731).

The modern German term "Münster" is the translation for minster. Monastery or cloister is called "Kloster".

== History ==
=== Early and mid Anglo-Saxon periods ===
The first minsters in the English-speaking parts of Britain were founded in the century after the mission to the Saxons led by Augustine of Canterbury in 597. The first cases for which documentary evidence has been preserved are Oswy's programme of 654/5, in which he endowed 12 small minsters, and a gift from Alhfrith to Wilfrid in around 660 to accompany the foundation of the minster at Ripon. An expansion of monasteries began around 670, with many substantial royal gifts of land. Kings made grants of land to named individuals to found a minster. In 734 Bede wrote a letter to Ecgbert (Archbishop of York), warning that noble families were abusing the privileged legal status accorded to the clergy, by making excessive landed endowments to minsters under their control. This reduced the overall stock of lands carrying the obligations of military service to the Northumbrian state.

Alan Thacker states:

The term 'minster' was applied by the Anglo-Saxons to all religious communities, whether of monks proper or of secular clergy, a usage which reflects the fact that many early Anglo-Saxon monasteries had assumed the pastoral role which was ultimately the principal distinction of the secular college. Early Anglo-Saxon monks might baptize, preach, and administer the sacraments to the laity in their locality, and distinctions were further blurred by the existence of 'double monasteries' of nuns and secular clerks. In the last resort, however, monks could be free of pastoral obligations, while the secular minster always had its parish ('parochia') over which it exercised extensive and well-defined rights, including control over baptism and burial and the receipt of various financial dues such as church-scot and tithe.

The word derives from the Old English "mynster", meaning "monastery", "nunnery", "mother church" or "cathedral", itself derived from the Latin "monasterium" and the Ancient Greek "μοναστήριον", meaning a group of clergy where the Brothers would cloister themselves to meditate . Thus, "minster" could apply to any church whose clergy followed a formal rule: as for example a monastery or a chapter; or to a church served by a less formal group of clergy living communally. In the earliest days of the English Church, from the 6th to the 8th centuries, minsters, in their various forms, constituted the only form of Christian institution with a permanent site. At the beginning of the period, they were the only form of permanent collective settlement in a culture that had not developed towns or cities. Kings, nobles and bishops were continually on the move, with their respective retinues, from estate to estate.

Minsters were commonly founded by the king or by a royal thegn, receiving a royal charter and a corporate endowment of bookland and other customary agricultural rights and entitlements within a broad territory; as well as exemption from certain forms of customary service (especially military). The superior of the minster was generally from the family of the founder. The minster's primary purpose was to support the king and the thegn in the regular worship of the divine office; especially through intercession in times of war. Minsters are also said to have been founded, or extensively endowed, in expiation for royal crimes; as for example Minster-in-Thanet near Ramsgate. Minsters might acquire pastoral and missionary responsibilities, for instance the three minsters of north-east Herefordshire, Leominster, Bromyard and Ledbury, all active in their areas before the towns were founded on episcopal manors; but initially this appear to have been of secondary importance. In the 9th century, almost all English minsters suffered severely from the depredations of Viking invaders; and even when a body of clergy continued, any form of regular monastic life typically ceased. The important role of minsters in the organisation of the early Christian church in Anglo-Saxon England has been called the "Minster hypothesis".

=== Late Saxon and Norman periods ===
Following the English recovery in the 10th century, surviving minsters were often refounded in accordance with the new types of collective religious bodies then becoming widespread in Western Europe, as monasteries following the reformed Benedictine rule, or as collegiate churches or cathedral chapters following the rule of Chrodegang of Metz. Consequently, by the 11th century, a hierarchy of minsters became apparent; cathedral churches, or head minsters having pre-eminence within a diocese; surviving old minsters being pre-eminent within an area broadly equivalent to an administrative hundred; while newer lesser minsters and field churches were increasingly proliferating on local estates; the difference being that lesser minsters had graveyards, where field churches did not. Of particular importance for these developments, was the royal enforcement in this period of tithe as a compulsory religious levy on arable production. This vastly increased the resources available to support clergy; but at the same time strongly motivated local landowners to found their own local churches, so as to retain tithe income within their own estates.

In the 11th and 12th centuries former lesser minsters and field churches, typically served by individual priests, developed into the network of parishes familiar to this day. The old minsters mostly then were designated as parish churches. For these parish churches, their former pre-eminence was acknowledged by the occasional retention of the honorific title; and sometimes by the continued recognition of former estate churches within their ancient territories as being, in some degree, of subsidiary status and dignity. Otherwise however, old minsters might continue collective worship as collegiate churches; their clergy initially being designated as 'portioners', as each canon was supported by a set portion of the college's endowment income. During the 11th and 12th centuries many such former minsters were provided with new statutes by which their endowments were split between their complement of canons, such that each canonry then became a 'prebend'; but otherwise numbers of former minsters continued as 'portioner' colleges through the medieval period.

=== Late-20th- and 21st-century additions ===
The Church of England has designated additional minsters in the 20th and 21st centuries, by adding an honorific title to existing parish churches. The practice continues in the 2020s.

== Current usage in England ==
Status		Examples
Cathedrals	Time immemorial	Lincoln Cathedral, Lincolnshire; York Minster, North Yorkshire
Cathedrals	19th-century elevation	Ripon Cathedral, North Yorkshire; Southwell Minster, Nottinghamshire
Parish churches	Former cathedral	Stow Minster, Lincolnshire
Parish churches	Former collegiate church	Beverley Minster, East Yorkshire; Hemingbrough Minster, North Yorkshire; Howden Minster, East Yorkshire; Wimborne Minster, Dorset
Parish churches	Parish church	St Andrew's Minster, Ashingdon, Essex; Reading Minster, Berkshire; Stonegrave Minster, North Yorkshire; St. Gregory's Minster, Kirkdale, North Yorkshire; St Denys' Church, Warminster, Wiltshire
Parish churches	Parish church (recent elevation)	Cheltenham Minster, Gloucestershire (2013); Croydon Minster, London (2011); Dewsbury Minster, West Yorkshire (1994); Doncaster Minster, South Yorkshire (2004); Godalming Minster, Surrey (2024); Great Yarmouth Minster, Norfolk (2011); Grimsby Minster, Lincolnshire (2010); Halifax Minster, West Yorkshire (2009); Hull Minster, East Yorkshire (2017); Ipswich Minster, Suffolk (2025); King's Lynn Minster, Norfolk (2011); Leeds Minster, West Yorkshire (2012); Plymouth Minster, Devon (2009); Preston Minster, Lancashire (2003); Rotherham Minster, South Yorkshire (2004); Stoke Minster, Staffordshire (2005); Sunderland Minster, Tyne and Wear (1998); St Helens Minster, Merseyside (2026); Sts. Thomas Minster, Isle of Wight (2008); Taunton Minster, Somerset (2022)
Minster status preserved in placenames		Axminster, Bedminster, Exminster, Forrabury and Minster, Ilminster, Iwerne Minster, Leominster, Lytchett Minster, Minster-in-Thanet, Kidderminster, Upminster, Westminster, Wimborne Minster
Ruins		South Elmham Minster

== Current usage in Wales ==
Wales saw the designation of its first minster church in 2024, as St. Mary's Church in Swansea was officially granted minster status by the Church in Wales.

Similarly to Church of England practice, the Welsh Anglicans announced that minster status is a title for large or important churches, particularly collegiate churches or cathedrals. The dedication was part of the Church in Wales historic £10 million effort of evangelism throughout Wales, and reflects the importance of the minster to the surrounding area. The dedication was presided over by The Most Rev. Andy John, Archbishop of Wales and Bishop of Bangor, in a special service on February 16, 2025.

Status		Examples
Parish churches	Parish church (recent elevation)	Swansea Minster, South Wales (2025)

== In German-speaking countries ==
Some churches have the title Münster, and some churches are officially one but do not carry it in their name. Examples include:

- Basel Minster
- Bern Minster
- Essen Minster
- Freiburg Minster
- Konstanz Minster
- Salem Minster
- Ulm Minster
- Radolfzell Minster
- Moosburg Minster

== Footnotes ==
=== Sources ===
- Foot, Sarah (2006). Monastic Life in Anglo-Saxon England, c.600-900. Cambridge University Press.
- Morris, Richard (1989). Churches in the Landscape. J.M. Dent.
