= Royal vill =

Anglo-Saxon settlement

A royal vill, royal tun or villa regalis (Old English: cyneliċ tūn) was the central settlement of a rural territory in Anglo-Saxon England, which would be visited by the King and members of the royal household on regular circuits of their kingdoms. The royal vill was the centre for the administration of a subdivision of a kingdom, and the location where the subdivision would support the royal household through the provision of food rent. Royal vills have been identified as the centres of the regiones of the early Anglo-Saxon period, and of the smaller multiple estates into which regiones were gradually divided by the 8th century.

The British Isles during the early Middle Ages lacked the sophisticated long-distance trade in essential foodstuffs required to support agriculturally unproductive households in a single location. Kings and their entourages could therefore only support themselves by constantly moving between territories with an obligation to support them, and they maintained networks of halls and accommodation distributed throughout their kingdoms for this purpose. These royal vills also provided points of contact between royal households and local populations.

Substantial Anglo-Saxon royal vills have been excavated at sites including Yeavering in Northumbria and at Cowdery's Down in Basingstoke, revealing settlements with large timber halls for feasting purposes and other social venues.

== Bibliography ==
- Charles-Edwards, Thomas (1989), "Early medieval kingships in the British Isles", in Bassett, Steven (ed.), The Origins of Anglo-Saxon Kingdoms, Leicester: Leicester University Press, pp. 28–39, ISBN 0718513177
- Rippon, Stephen (2012), Making Sense of an Historic Landscape, Oxford: Oxford University Press, ISBN 978-0199533787
- Yorke, Barbara (2002), Kings and Kingdoms of Early Anglo-Saxon England, London: Routledge, ISBN 1134707258
