= Basingas =

The Basingas were an Old English tribe, whose territory in the Loddon Valley formed a regio or administrative subdivision of the early Kingdom of Wessex. Their leader, Basa, gave the tribe its name which survives in the names of Old Basing and Basingstoke, both in Hampshire. (The existence of both the tribe and their leader must be assumed to have been inferred from the existence of the place name "Basingstoke" as there is no independent documentary evidence referring to them.)

== Origins ==
Settlement patterns suggest the existence of a town at Basingstoke attached to the nearby oppidum of Winklebury prior to the Roman conquest of Britain. In the early Roman era it was the nearest town to Calleva Atrebatum, lay between two roads leading to Venta Belgarum and Noviomagus Reginorum and was populated predominantly by the Atrebates.

== History ==
The Basingas settled the eastern outskirts of Basingstoke concurrent with the Frankish conquest of Alamannia in the early sixth century. In subsequent generations they took over de facto governance of the town. They appear to have been subsumed into the Kingdom of Wessex early in its formation, as they are not mentioned as a distinct tribe in the Tribal Hidage. Their territory (Basengum) is mentioned in the Anglo-Saxon Chronicle as the site of a battle versus Danish Vikings in 871 AD.

Old Basing was first settled around 700 by an Old English tribe known as the Basingas, who give the village its name (the meaning is "Basa's people"). It was the site of the Battle of Basing on 22 January 871, when a Danish army defeated Ethelred of Wessex. It is also mentioned in the Domesday Book of 1086.

The subdivision of the Basingas retained a role beyond the Anglo-Saxon period as Basingstoke remained the administrative centre for a distinctive grouping of hundreds within Hampshire throughout the Middle Ages.
