= Murdrum =

Historical English crime

Murdrum was the crime of murdering someone in a secret manner in medieval English law.

== Origins ==
It was introduced into Anglo-Saxon law by the Danes. It is distinguished from simple homicide. In the laws of Cnut an unknown man who was killed was presumed to be a Dane, and the vill or tithing was compelled to pay 40 marks for his death.

After the Norman Conquest of 1066, the law was revived to protect the Anglo-Normans. The origins of the Norman law are described in the 12th-century Dialogus de Scaccario:

In the period immediately following the Conquest what were left of the conquered English lay in ambush for the distrusted and hated Normans and murdered them secretly in woods and unfrequented places as opportunity offered. Now when the kings and their ministers had for some years inflicted the most severe penalties on the English without effect, it was finally decided that the hundred in which a Norman was found killed, without his slayer being known or revealing his identity by flight, should be mulcted in a large sum ... according to the locality of the murder and the commonness of the crime.

In later years, the Anglo-Normans became indistinguishable from the native English. Nevertheless, the murdrum was retained as the most effective law against secret murder (as opposed to open murder that could be handled by the hue and cry) no matter the victim's ethnicity.

== Exemptions and abolition ==
When King Henry I granted tax liberties to London in 1133, he exempted the city from taxes such as scot, danegeld, and murdrum. Richard I of England exempted the Knights Templar from being charged with murdrum and Latrocinium amongst other privileges. The murdrum was abolished in the reign of Edward III.

== See also ==
- Frankpledge
