= German collective guilt =

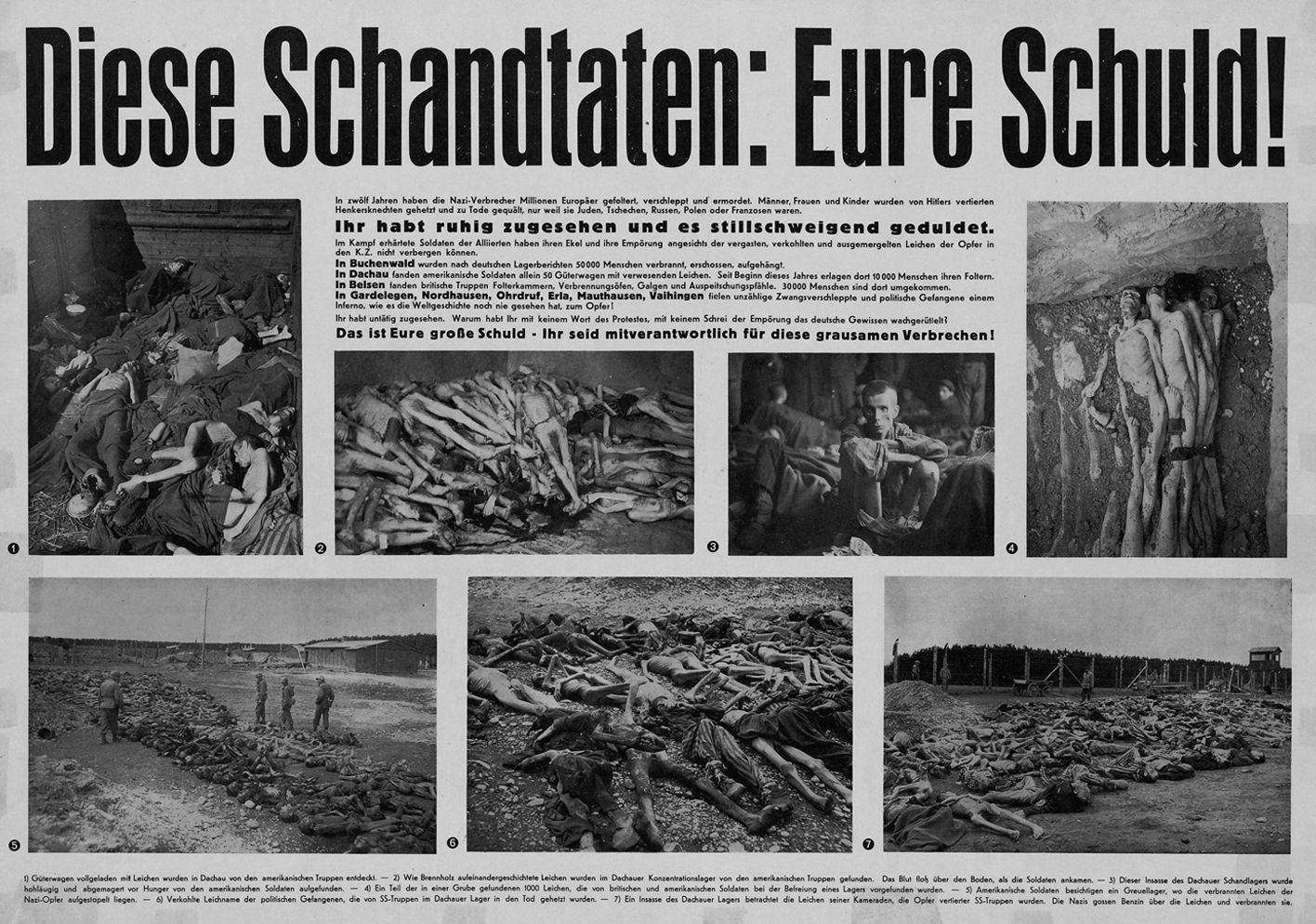
"These atrocities: Your fault!" – a poster showing the concentration camps to the German populace. The text accuses Germans as a whole of doing nothing while atrocities were committed.

German collective guilt (German: Kollektivschuld) refers to the contentious notion of a shared, collective responsibility attributed to the German people as a whole for the perpetration of the Holocaust and other atrocities committed by Nazi Germany during World War II.

== Advocates ==
Swiss psychoanalyst Carl Jung wrote an influential essay in 1945 about this concept as a psychological phenomenon, in which he asserted that the German people felt a collective guilt (Kollektivschuld) for the atrocities committed by their fellow countrymen, and so introduced the term into German intellectual discourse. Jung said collective guilt was "for psychologists a fact, and it will be one of the most important tasks of therapy to bring the Germans to recognize this guilt."

After the war, the Allied occupation forces in Allied-occupied Germany promoted shame and guilt with a publicity campaign, which included posters depicting Nazi concentration camps with slogans such as "These Atrocities: Your Fault!" (Diese Schandtaten: Eure Schuld!).

The theologian Martin Niemöller and other churchmen accepted shared guilt in the Stuttgarter Schuldbekenntnis (Stuttgart Declaration of Guilt) of 1945. The philosopher and psychologist Karl Jaspers delivered lectures to students in 1946 which were published under the title The Question of German Guilt. In this published work, Jaspers describes how "an acknowledgment of national guilt was a necessary condition for the moral and political rebirth of Germany". Additionally, Jaspers believed that no one could escape this collective guilt, and taking responsibility for it might enable the German people to transform their society from its state of collapse into a more highly developed and morally responsible democracy. He believed that those who committed war crimes were morally guilty, and those who tolerated them without resistance were politically guilty, leading to collective guilt for all.

The German collective guilt for the events of the Holocaust has long been an idea that has been pondered by famous and well-known German politicians and thinkers. In addition to those mentioned previously, German author and philosopher Bernhard Schlink describes how he sometimes feels as if being German is a huge burden, due to the country's past. According to Schlink, "the reason the European crisis is so agonising for Germany is that the country has been able to retreat from itself by hurling itself into the European project". Schlink also believes that "the burden of nationality has very much shaped the way in which Germans view themselves and their responsibilities within Europe", and he describes how Germans see themselves as Atlanticists or Europeans, rather than as Germans. Schlink sees this existing guilt becoming weaker from generation to generation. Thomas Mann also advocated for collective guilt:

Those, whose world became grey a long time ago when they realized what mountains of hate towered over Germany; those, who a long time ago imagined during sleepless nights how terrible would be the revenge on Germany for the inhuman deeds of the Nazis, cannot help but view with wretchedness all that is being done to Germans by the Russians, Poles or Czechs as nothing other than a mechanical and inevitable reaction to the crimes that the people have committed as a nation, in which unfortunately individual justice, or the guilt or innocence of the individual, can play no part.

== Opponents ==
Björn Höcke, leader of the Thuringian state branch of the far-right Alternative for Germany party, has called the Holocaust memorial in Berlin a "monument of shame," and has called for a "180-degree change in memory policy." Höcke's comments were unanimously condemned by media and politicians across the political spectrum. The Buchenwald Memorial Foundation accused Höcke of defaming the public memory of the murdered Jews of Europe; Charlotte Knobloch accused him of "intolerable völkisch agitation", stating that the AfD is poisoning Germany's political culture with "right-wing extremist, racist, and anti-semitic theories and tirades." In response to his comments, the Center for Political Beauty, an activist group, erected a replica of the Berlin Holocaust memorial within sight of Höcke's house.

In January 2025, at a campaign event which was staged by the political party Alternative for Germany, Elon Musk stated that "There is too much focus on past guilt, and we need to move beyond that". Musk's comments were also widely condemned. According to a 2025 poll by the Remembrance, Responsibility and Future Foundation, 45% of Germans agreed that it made them "angry at how even today the crimes against the Jews are held against the Germans", while 28% disagreed.

== See also ==
- Austria victim theory
- Anti-Germans (political current)
- Myth of the clean Wehrmacht
- Denazification
- Diffusion of responsibility
- Germanophobia
- German resistance to Nazism
- Gonin Gumi
- Japanese history textbook controversies
- Milgram experiment
- Moral disengagement
- Reprisal
- State responsibility
- War crime
- War Guilt Clause
- War guilt question
- Wiedergutmachung
- Vergangenheitsbewältigung
- White guilt
- Zero hour (1945)
