= Pre-trial detention =

Detention after arrest and charge until a trial

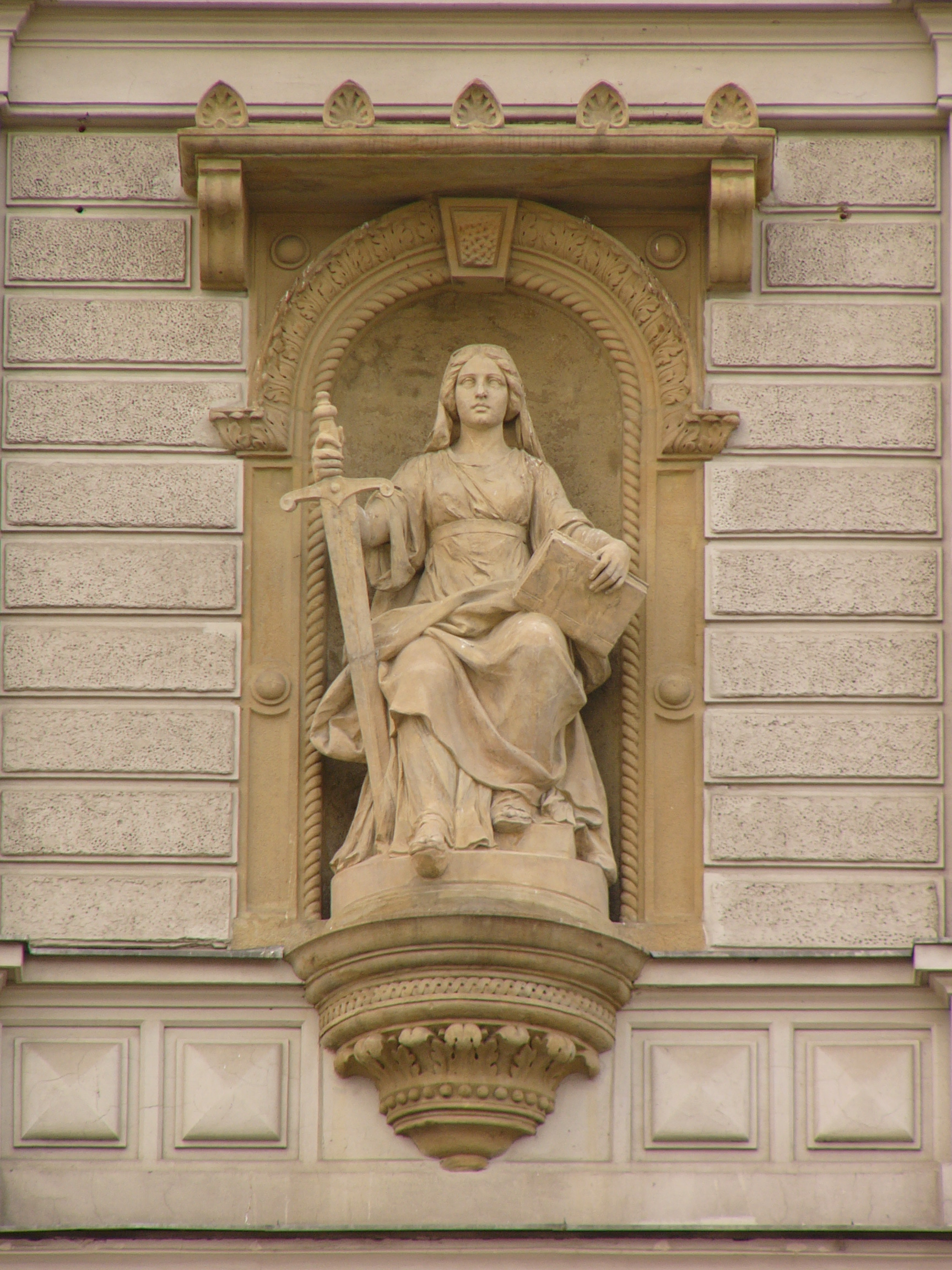
Lady Justice—the allegory of justice—statue at court building in Olomouc, Czech Republic

Pre-trial detention, also known as jail, preventive detention, provisional detention, or remand, is the process of detaining a person until their trial, after they have been arrested and charged with an offence. A person who is on remand is held in a jail, prison or detention centre or held under house arrest. Varying terminology is used, especially from country to country; the term "remand" is generally used in common law jurisdictions and "preventive detention" elsewhere. In the United States, "remand" is rare except in official documents, and "jail" is the most commonly used term. Detention before charge is commonly referred to as custody and continued detention after conviction is referred to as imprisonment.

Because imprisonment without trial is contrary to the presumption of innocence, pre-trial detention in liberal democracies is usually subject to safeguards and restrictions. Typically, a suspect will be remanded only if it is likely that they could commit a serious crime, interfere with the investigation, or fail to come to the trial. In the majority of court cases, the suspect will not be in detention while awaiting trial, often with restrictions such as bail.

Research on pre-trial detention in the United States has found that pre-trial detention increases the likelihood of convictions, primarily because individuals who would otherwise be acquitted or have their charges dropped enter guilty pleas. A 2021 review of existing research found that "the current pretrial system [in the US] imposes substantial short- and long-term economic harms on detained defendants in terms of lost earnings and government assistance, while providing little in the way of decreased criminal activity for the public interest... the costs of cash bail and pretrial detention are disproportionately borne by Black and Hispanic individuals, giving rise to large and unfair racial differences in cash bail and detention that cannot be explained by underlying differences in pretrial misconduct risk."

== Detention before charge or trial ==
The pre-charge detention period is the period of time during which an individual can be held and questioned by police, prior to being charged with an offence. Not all countries have such a concept, and in those that do, the period for which a person may be detained without charge varies by jurisdiction. The prohibition of prolonged detention without charge, habeas corpus, was first introduced in England about a century after the 1215 Magna Carta; the use of habeas corpus ad subjiciendum in 1305 was cited by William Blackstone.

=== Albania ===
Albania has one of the highest rates of pre-trial detention in Europe. In November 2025, the United Nations Committee Against Torture (CAT) reported that approximately 57 per cent of detainees in Albania were held in pre-trial detention, describing its use as systematic rather than exceptional and noting its contribution to severe prison overcrowding. The Committee, citing findings of the European Committee for the Prevention of Torture (CPT), also raised concerns about detention conditions, including inadequate living standards and limited access to medical care, particularly at the Tirana Prison Hospital.

=== Armenia ===
Armenia has one of the highest rates of pre-trial detention in Europe, with nearly half of its prison population awaiting trial rather than serving a conviction. Although reforms such as the 2021 Criminal Procedure Code aimed to make detention a last resort, critics say it is still used routinely, raising concerns about due process, the presumption of innocence, and public trust in the justice system.

=== Czech Republic ===
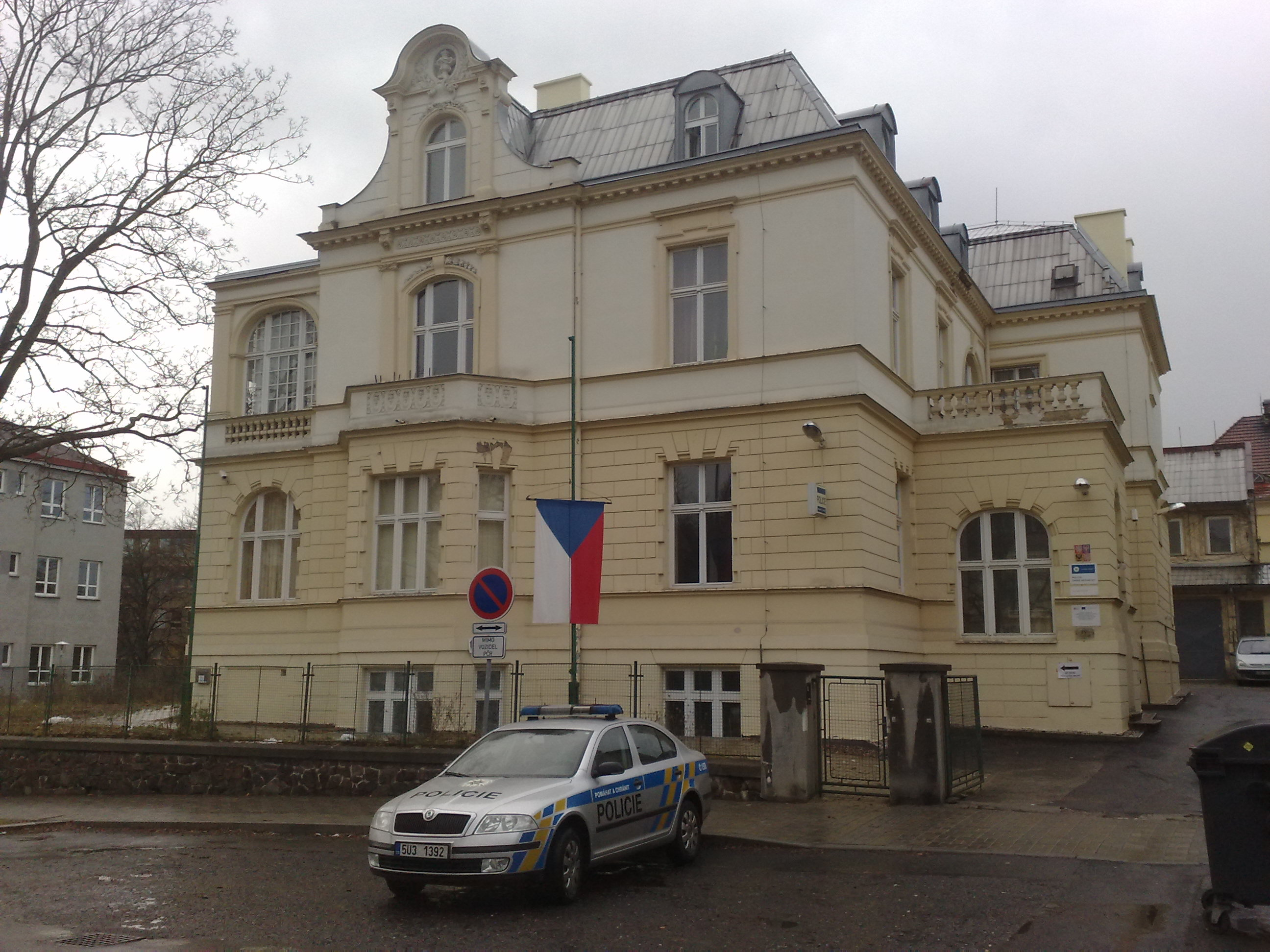
Czech Police station in Teplice

Under Article 8 of the Charter of Fundamental Rights and Basic Freedoms of the Czech Republic, which has the same legal standing as the Czech Constitution, a suspect must be immediately familiarised with the grounds of detention, must be interviewed and within 48 hours either released or charged and handed over to a court. The court then has a further 24 hours either to order a custody, or to release the person detained.

Detailed rules of detention are included in the Criminal Procedural Code. The Czech Police may arrest and detain a suspect after obtaining prosecutor's consent. In an urgent case the police may detain a suspect without the consent. In both cases, however, the police detention may take place only when grounds for pre-trial detention exist. The statutory limits of 48 + 24 hours must be complied with and reaching the time limit should aways trigger immediate release, unless a court has ordered pre-trial custody.

Anybody may detain a person, who was caught while perpetrating a crime (not a misdemeanor) or immediately after it, when capturing of the perpetrator is necessary to either ascertain the perpetrator's identity or to prevent the perpetrator from escaping or to secure evidence. The perpetrator must immediately be handed over to the police, or when that is not possible, detention of the perpetrator must be immediately reported to the police.

=== People's Republic of China ===
According to a reply of the Supreme People's Court, detention refers to the detention of a suspect or defendant in a specific place in accordance with the law, restricting or temporarily depriving them. Compulsory measures for personal freedom include arrest and detention. Criminal detention is when police departments and prosecutor's offices deal with criminal cases, in which current criminals or major suspects are temporarily deprived of their personal freedom and detained in a statutory emergency situation.

==== Requirements ====
- Chinese police departments can first detain current criminals or major suspects in one of the following situations:

1. Preparing to commit a crime, committing a crime, or being discovered immediately after the crime.
2. The victim or the person who saw it with his own eyes identified that he committed a crime.
3. Crime evidence is found in or around the scene.
4. Attempting to commit suicide, run away or remain at large after committing a crime.
5. There is a possibility of destruction, forged evidence or collusion of confession.
6. A false name and address is given, with the true identity of the suspect remaining unknown.
7. There are frequent crimes, multiple crimes, gang crime and major suspects.

- In addition to the authority of the police to decide and enforce detention in accordance with the law, the prosecutor's office also has the right to decide to detain criminal suspects and defendants in the following two situations in cases directly accepted by the prosecutor's office:.

1. Attempt to commit suicide, escape or escape after committing a crime;
2. There is a possibility of destruction, forged evidence or collusion. After the People's Procuratorate decides to detain, it shall be executed by the public security department.

==== Review of the necessity of detention ====
The 2012 amendments to the Criminal Procedure Law added a system for reviewing criminal suspects in custody after arrest. On 13 January 2016, the chief prosecutor issued the "Regulations on the People's Procuratorate for Handling Custody Necessity Review Cases (Trial)," which would translate to Prosecutorial Guidelines for Pretrial Detention Reviews (Trial) in American and British English. Under the guidelines, criminal suspects and defendants may petition the prosecutor's office for a pretrial detention review. If the prosecutor's office considers that detention is unnecessary after the review, it will recommend that the case-handling agency release the suspect or change its compulsory measures.

Subsequent rules describe how prosecutors’ offices should review whether pretrial detention remains justified after an arrest. In 2023, the chief prosecutor and police ministry jointly issued the Provisions on Efforts to Review and Assess the Necessity of Detention, which in American and British English would translate to Pretrial Detention Review Rules. The rules require prosecutors to review whether a defendant should be released or detained pending trial and, where detention is unnecessary, recommend release or a motion for amendment of the conditions of release. When detention reviews are triggered by motions or jail recommendations, the rules set statutory deadlines and require the police and courts to report implementation of prosecutor recommendations within a 10-day deadline, with a corrective action notice where they do not.

==== During custody ====
- Criminal detention

The detention period is 3 days, and can be extended for 1–4 days with the approval of the administrative person in charge of the police department. Suspects who commit crimes on the verge of committing crimes, committing multiple crimes, or conspiring to commit crimes can be extended for 30 days (up to 37 days). During the period of detention, it is ruled out that criminal suspects are released, If the prosecutor's office does not approve the arrest, the suspect shall be released immediately. If the prosecutor approves the arrest, it will go directly to the stage of investigation and custody. Those who need to continue the investigation and meet the conditions for release on bail pending trial or residential surveillance shall be released on bail pending trial or residential surveillance in accordance with the law.

- Detective custody

The period of investigation and custody after the arrest of a criminal suspect shall not exceed two months. Cases that are complicated and cannot be terminated after the time limit expires may be extended for one month with the approval of the prosecutor's office at the next higher level.

If the investigation cannot be terminated after the expiration of the preceding article, it may be extended for two months with the approval or decision of the provincial, autonomous region, or home rule city prosecutor's office.

1. Major and complicated cases in remote areas with very inconvenient transportation
2. Major criminal group case
3. Severe and complicated cases of fleeing crimes
4. The crime involves a wide range of major and complicated cases with difficulty in obtaining evidence.

- Extended custody

Extended custody is based on the "Criminal Procedure Law of the People's Republic of China" for criminal suspects and defendants in the investigation, review and prosecution trial stages in which the period of custody of a suspect has been exceeded. Illegal acts that stipulate the time limit of custody by law. If the criminal suspect or defendant has been detained for more than five years, and the case is still in the stages of investigation, review and prosecution, first instance, and second instance, it is a case of "prolonged detention without decision". Prolonged unresolved cases may also have overdue custody, or there may be no overdue custody after legal procedures have been approved. According to the "Criminal Procedural Law of the People's Republic of China", the investigative agency's criminal detention period for criminal suspects is 30 days. In addition, there can be a maximum period of 7 days for arrest and review. When the case is transferred from the police to the prosecutor's office and the court, the procedure of "changing custody" must be carried out in accordance with the law. If a criminal suspect or defendant is found to have been detained for an extended period of time, if the detention center fails to promptly report to the prosecutor's office in writing and notify the case-handling agency, the procuratorate stationed in the detention center shall report to the chief prosecutor for approval and issue a "Notice of Correction of Illegal Laws" to the detention center in the name of that court.

=== Ireland ===
In Ireland, a person brought before the District Court and charged may be either released on bail or held on remand (Irish: athchur) while awaiting trial. Typically this is for less than 8 days, but it can be as long as 30 days. Cloverhill Prison is the main remand prison in the Dublin area. If the prisoner's court appearance is in 4 days or less, they may be held at a Garda station. In the 2020s, there has been an increase in the number of prisoners held on remand for minor offences, Peter McVerry noting that remand was almost always used if the defendant was homeless or severely mentally ill.

=== United Kingdom ===
Pre-trial detention in England and Wales allows courts to remand defendants in custody before conviction, engaging the right to liberty and the presumption of innocence, and is governed primarily by the Bail Act 1976, which establishes a rebuttable presumption in favour of release. Empirical research found that despite legal reforms introduced in 2017 to require greater disclosure, sufficient time for decision-making, and clearer reasoning, pre-trial detention hearings often remain brief, poorly reasoned, and characterized by limited engagement with case-specific factors. As a result, the reforms have had minimal impact in practice, demonstrating a persistent gap between formal legal standards and the entrenched culture of pre-trial detention decision-making in UK courts.

England and Wales is nevertheless recognised as having a comparatively low rate of pre-trial detention relative to many European and global counterparts, despite the significant absolute number of defendants remanded in custody each year. This has been attributed to structural features of the legal framework, including a strong statutory presumption of bail, custody time limits, restrictions on detention for non-imprisonable offences, limited use of money bail, and the availability of tailored alternatives to custody, all of which act to constrain routine or disproportionate use of pre-trial detention.

=== United States ===
In the United States, a person is protected by the federal Constitution from being held in prison unlawfully. The right to have one's detention reviewed by a judge is called habeas corpus. The U.S. Constitution states that "The Privilege of the Writ of Habeas Corpus shall not be suspended, unless when in Cases of Rebellion or Invasion the public Safety may require it". A declaration of a state of emergency can suspend the right to habeas corpus.

No person shall be held to answer for any capital, or otherwise infamous crime, unless on a presentment or indictment of a Grand Jury, except in cases arising in the land or naval forces, or in the Militia, when in actual service in time of War or public danger; ... nor be deprived of life, liberty, or property, without due process of law

— Fifth Amendment to the United States Constitution

The Sixth Amendment requires criminal defendants to be "informed of the nature and cause of the accusation". The U.S. Bill of Rights thus grants some protection against being held without criminal charge, subject to the courts' interpretation of what due process means. Federal authorities have also exercised the power to arrest people on the basis of being a material witness. Involuntary commitment of the mentally ill is another category of detention without criminal prosecution, but the right of habeas corpus still applies. The scope of such detentions is also limited by the Bill of Rights.

The executive's military powers have been used to justify holding enemy combatants as prisoners of war, unlawful combatants, and civilian internees; the latter two practices have been controversial, especially with regard to the indefinite detention implied by uncertainty as to when the "war on terror" might be declared to have ended. Administrative detention, a term applied to many of these categories, is also used to imprison illegal immigrants.

=== Sweden ===
In Swedish law, häktning is a pre-trial supervision measure, where a suspect can be jailed for crimes that have a prison term of at least one year. There are two degrees of suspicion: reasonable suspicion is the lower level, and probable cause is the higher level. Remanding occurs if the committed crime has a statutory minimum penalty of at least one year, and includes:

1. a risk of recidivism,
2. a risk that the suspect will destroy evidence or otherwise affect the investigation of the crime, or
3. a risk that the suspect will flee prosecution or punishment.

Alternatively, remanding occurs for probable cause suspicion (and lesser crimes) when:

1. the suspect does not have permanent residence in Sweden, and can be assumed to want to leave Sweden.
2. the identity of the suspect is not established, if the suspect refuses to provide it or has given a false identity.

A person may be held in custody normally for no more than 14 days (or seven days if the degree of suspicion is reasonable suspicion). After the period, a new hearing is held to determine whether or not häktning should be extended. For suspects under age 18, "serious reasons" for detention decisions are needed and should be notified to court. From July 2021, a person remanded under häktning cannot be held in custody for longer than six to nine months in total (three months for minors).

When a person is facing less serious crimes, they are given a summary penalty order by prosecutors. A person who was remanded but was not sentenced or freed after trial is entitled to financial compensation, which is determined by the Chancellor of Justice. The compensation can vary, but it is usually 30,000 SEK for the first month; 20,000 SEK for every subsequent month, up to and including the sixth month; and 15,000 SEK for every month after that. Any loss of income is also compensated. In 2007, 1200 people were compensated.

If a prisoner is sentenced, the remand time counts as part of the prison time, such that less time remains after the trial. The Committee for the Prevention of Torture of the Council of Europe has repeatedly criticised pre-trial detention in Sweden for the high percentage of cases where restrictions on communication are applied. In Sweden, communication restrictions include no visits, no telephone calls, no newspapers, and no TV.

=== Turkey ===
Pretrial detention in Turkey, as illustrated in the case of several politicians, has in some instances extended for periods exceeding seven years. This practice has drawn scrutiny from international human rights bodies, which have raised concerns about the justification for such prolonged detention, particularly when it involves individuals charged with offenses related to political speech. The European Court of Human Rights has issued judgments calling for release in specific cases, finding violations of rights to liberty and freedom of expression. The continuation of detention despite these rulings highlights ongoing debates regarding legal procedures and compliance with international human rights standards.

Recent rulings in Turkey have applied pretrial detention differently in separate cases. In one instance, courts ordered the continued pretrial detention of two journalists charged in connection with their reporting, while granting pretrial release on bail to two individuals accused of assaulting a journalist. More recently, the use of pretrial detention has been highlighted by the case of Istanbul Mayor Ekrem İmamoğlu, who has been held in pretrial custody since March after prosecutors accused him of 142 corruption offenses carrying potential sentences totaling between 828 and 2,352 years, a move widely viewed in the context of his status as a leading political rival to President Recep Tayyip Erdoğan.

== Detention during trial ==
The term "remand" may be used to describe the process of keeping a person in detention rather than granting bail. A prisoner who is denied, refused or unable to meet the conditions of bail, or who is unable to post bail, may be held in a prison on remand. Although remanded prisoners are usually detained separately from sentenced prisoners, due to prison overcrowding they are sometimes held in a shared accommodation with sentenced prisoners. Reasons for being held in custody on remand vary depending on the local legal system, but may include:

- the suspect has been accused of carrying out a particularly serious offence
- the suspect having previous convictions for similar offences
- reasons to believe the suspect could leave the court's jurisdiction to avoid its trial and possible punishment
- reasons to believe the suspect may destroy evidence or interfere with witnesses
- the suspect is likely to commit further offences before the trial
- the suspect is believed to be in danger from accomplices, victims, or vigilantes

In most countries, remand prisoners are considered innocent until proven guilty by a court and may be granted greater privileges than sentenced prisoners. For example, most jurisdictions that prohibit convicted criminals from voting in elections will still allow remand prisoners to vote, unless they have been disqualified from voting for some other reason. Other privileges commonly granted include:

- wearing own clothes rather than prison uniform
- keeping more personal possessions
- being entitled to additional visiting hours per week
- not being required to complete prison-related work or education

Not all remand prisons grant these privileges; in particular, remand prisoners are often forced to wear prison uniforms and denied additional visitation rights, supposedly for safety reasons, although some facilities allow remand prisoners to wear a uniform that is a different color or otherwise clearly distinguishable from the uniforms of convicted criminals. Often they are denied all visits and all newspaper and media access, for risk of interfering with the investigation, such as communicating a story with fellow remand prisoners.

=== Czech Republic ===
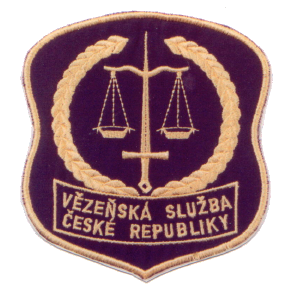
Seal of the Czech prison service

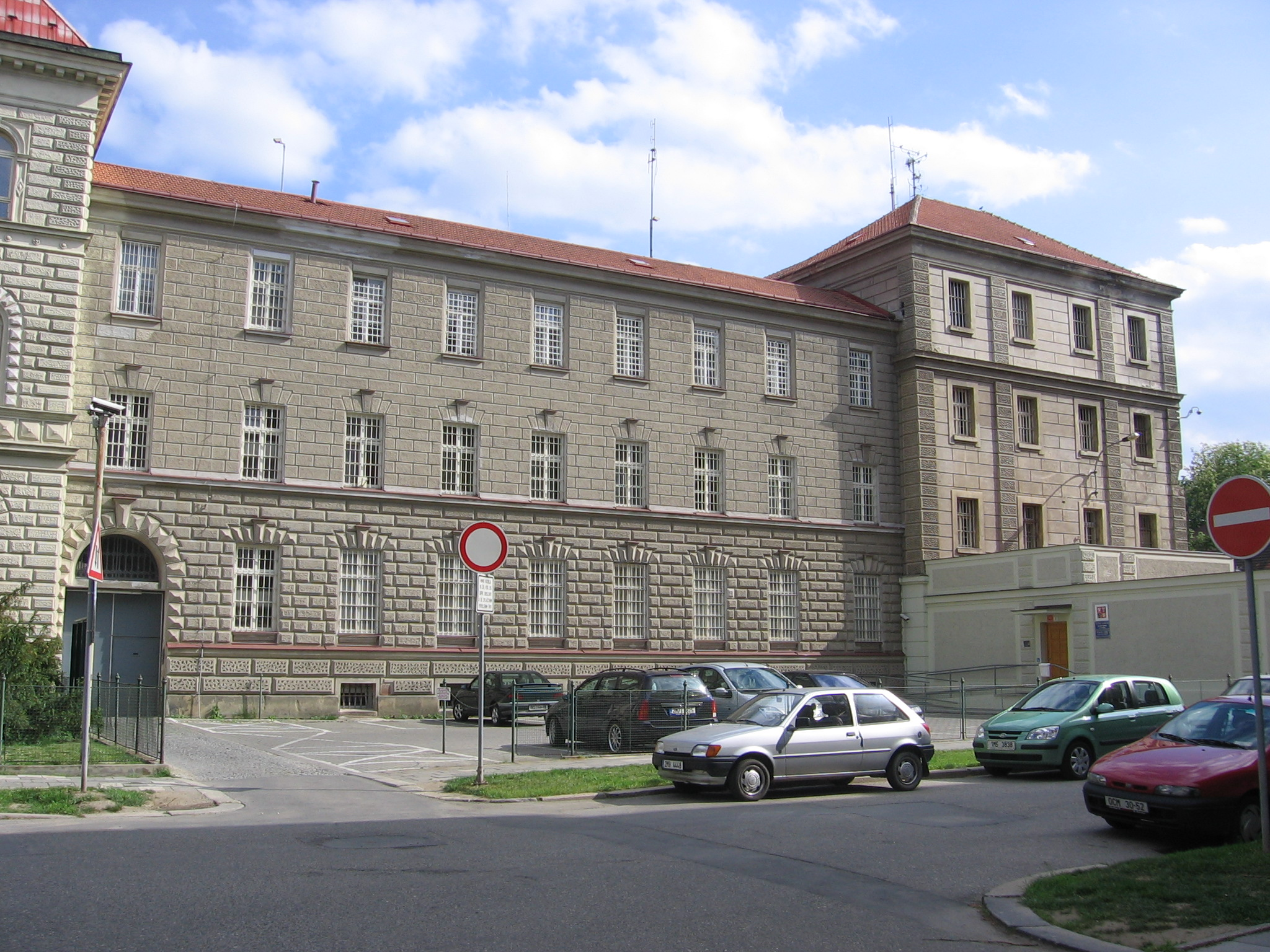
Olomouc remand prison

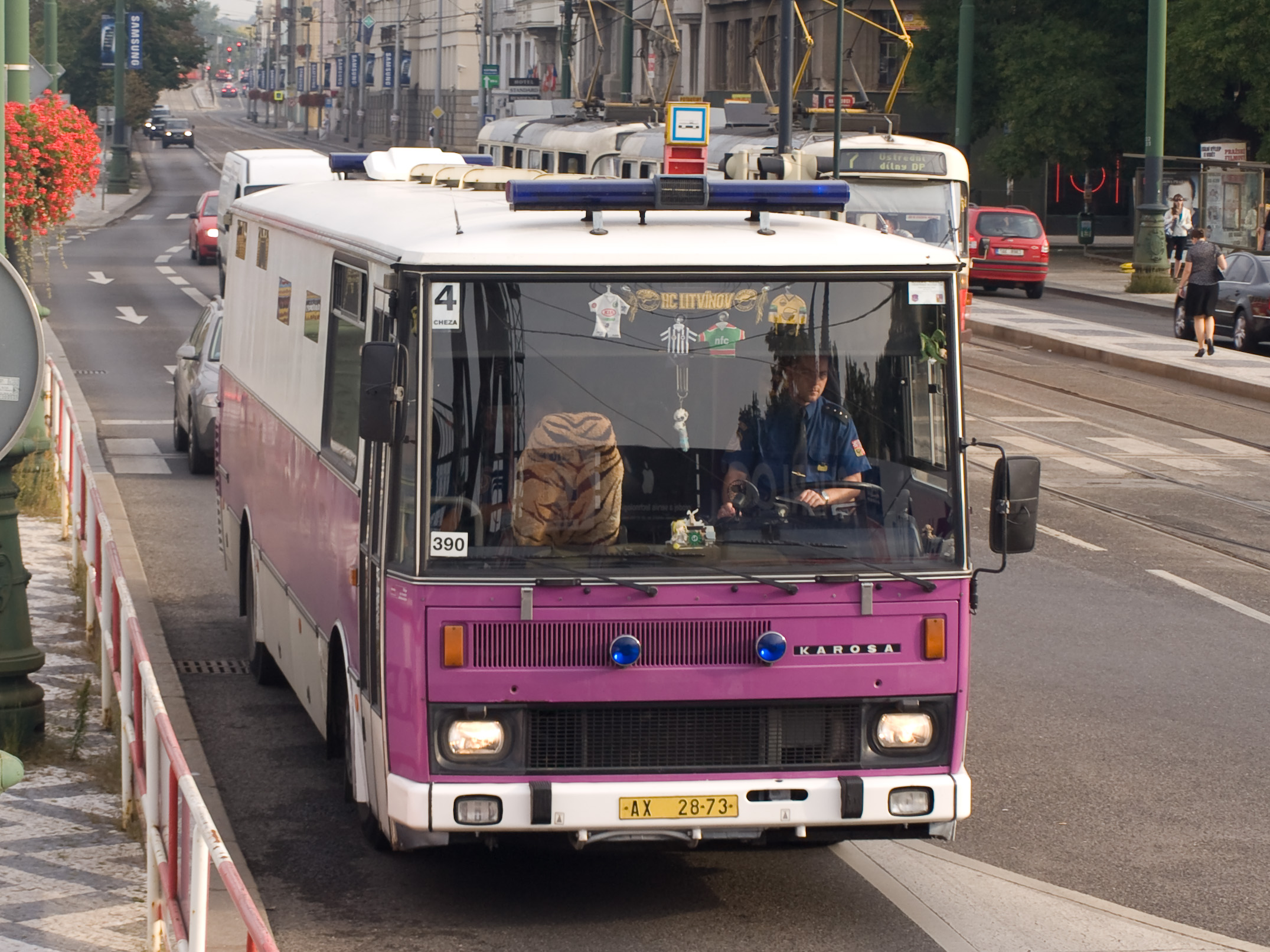
Buses of the Czech prison service are characterised by its white-violet color scheme and absence of windows in the prison section.

Under Article 8 (5) of the Charter of Fundamental Rights and Basic Freedoms, which has the same legal standing as the Constitution, nobody shall be taken into custody except on the basis of a court decision, and for reasons and a detention period stipulated by the law. Detailed rules of remand custody are contained in the Criminal Procedural Code. A person may be remanded in custody by the decision of a court only when a number of preconditions is met cumulatively:

- they have been charged with committing a crime which is punishable by
  - more than two years of imprisonment in case of intentionally committed crime, or
  - more than three years of imprisonment in case of negligently committed crime,

(the 2/3 years rule is subject to certain defined statutory exceptions, e.g. where a suspect has already been evading the proceedings) and

- there are reasonable grounds indicating that the alleged act was committed and it has all features of the given crime, and
- there are apparent reasons for suspicion, that the act was committed by the charged person, and
- because of the personality of the charged person, the nature of the crime and its gravity, the objective of the custody may not be reached by a different measure.

At the same time, there must be reasonable concern, that the charged person may either

- (a) escape or evade the criminal proceedings, or
- (b) influence witnesses or otherwise similarly frustrate the proceedings, or
- (c) continue criminal activity with which they were charged, or finish a criminal act they had attempted, or commit a criminal act they were preparing or threatening to commit.

The charged person may be remanded in custody subject to maximum terms as follows:

- one year in cases of crimes which are dealt with by a single judge,
- two years in cases of crimes which are dealt with by a panel of three judges,
- three years in cases of felony crimes (i.e. intentional crimes punishable by a sentence with an upper jail term of at least 10 years)
- four years in cases punishable by an exceptional penalty (i.e. 20–30 years or life imprisonment)

one third of the maximum detention periods time may be exhausted in pre-trial proceedings and two thirds may be exhausted during the trial. Reaching the maximum time is always reason for immediate release. An exception to the time limits above arises in cases of remand due to concern of (b) interfering with witnesses or similar frustration of proceedings, in which case the maximum pre-trial detention period may be only three months, except where the charged person has already been influencing witnesses or otherwise frustrating the proceedings.

The court must review the reasons for the pre-trial custody every three months and decide either to continue it, or to release the charged person. Both the prosecutor and the person in custody may file a complaint against any decision on custody, which leads to review by an appellate court. Special rules of remand pertain to persons who are processed for extradition, e.g. illegal foreigners, those detained due to international (foreign) warrant or the European Arrest Warrant.

==== Conditions in Czech remand prisons ====
In the Czech Republic, remand takes place in remand prisons or in separated sections of standard prisons. Remand prisons are often in city centres and appertain to court houses. Most remand prisons are over 80 years old, with some, like Pankrác Prison, being more than 125 years old. Men, women and juveniles are held separately. Also persons charged with committing different types of crimes (e.g. unintentional, intentional, violent, etc.) are held separately.

Deficiencies of remand prisons according to 2010 Czech ombudsman's report
- insufficient daylight
- too intensive nightlight
- insufficient space for out-walks
- lack of leisure activities
- lack of working opportunities
- presence of prison guards during health care delivery
- restricted access to telephone

Cells have capacity varying between 1–8 beds, with most having between 2–4 beds. Some remand prisons have rooms intended for watching TV, gyms or chapels, but these are exceptional mainly due to overcrowding and lack of space. All have special areas for interviews between the inmates and their attorneys, visiting rooms and courtyards for out-walks.

Each cell has a WC divided from the rest of the cell-space and running cold water. Each cell-mate has own bed, storage locker and chair. Inmates which are held due to concern of influencing witnesses are held in isolation with very limited possibility of contact with other inmates as well as the outer world (apart from interviews with own attorneys).

At any given time in 2011, there were around 2.500 inmates in the Czech remand prisons (including ~170 women and ~45 juveniles), compared to some 20.500 convicted inmates (for 10,6 million population). The average length of remand custody is around 100 days, with few inmates spending in remand more than 2 years.

More than half of foreign inmates of the Czech remand prisons are from Slovakia, Ukraine and Vietnam. Other numerous foreigners are from Bulgaria, Moldova, North Macedonia, Poland, Romania, Russia and Serbia. When it comes to non-European states, there are numerous detainees from Nigeria, Algeria, Morocco, Uzbekistan, Kazakhstan and Mongolia. There are mostly only few individuals of other nationalities.

=== Republic of Ireland ===
In the Republic of Ireland, a person may also be held on remand during trial.

=== United Kingdom ===
In England and Wales, a suspect may be remanded after charge if:

- The suspect has been charged with a serious crime
- The suspect has been convicted of a serious crime in the past
- The suspect has breached bail conditions or failed to surrender either now or in the past
- The police believe the suspect may not appear in court
- The police believe the suspect may commit another crime if released on bail

Remanding a suspect following arrest and until their first hearing at a magistrates' court is a decision made by the police using the criteria set above. Any such person 'remanded in police custody' will be transported by prisoner custody officers from the police cells to the next available sitting magistrate's court. This may be the same day, or may require the remanded individual to stay in police custody overnight or over the weekend. At the first hearing, the court will decide whether it necessary to remand the suspect until the end of the trial. If the suspect is not remanded the court may issue bail conditions for suspect to abide to until the trial. Adults will be held on court remand at a regular prison, while those below the age of 18 will be held at a secure centre for young people. If a remanded suspect is convicted and given a prison sentence, the time they spent on remand is deducted from the length of the sentence. A convicted suspect may be released immediately after being sentenced, if the time they spent on remand was longer than or equal to the sentence they received.

=== United States ===
The Eighth Amendment to the United States Constitution prohibits excessive bail. Under the US Code, pretrial detention of federal suspects is allowed only under certain circumstances, such as when the defendant is a danger to witnesses or jurors.

== Impact ==
Studies of pretrial detention in the United States have found that it significantly increases the probability of conviction and the length of sentences, largely because individuals who would otherwise be acquitted in trial enter guilty pleas. Studies have found that pretrial detention also lowers the defendants' prospects in the labour market, and contributes to poverty traps whereby individuals unable to pay bail end up accruing more debt. A 2017 study, using data from New York City, found that pretrial detention increases the likelihood of recidivism.

A 2025 report by the Venice Commission concludes that the pretrial detention of elected mayors has a dual impact, infringing not only on the individual's rights but also on the rights of voters, whose democratic choice is frustrated when their elected representative is replaced. Consequently, such detention constitutes a direct interference with citizens' fundamental right to participate in the conduct of local affairs, necessitating strict judicial scrutiny and robust procedural safeguards.

== Criticisms ==
Pre-trial detention has been described as a "necessary evil". A 2013 report by the Centre for Crime and Justice Studies concluded that pre-trial detention was being overused worldwide, and that most were being held for minor crimes. A 2014 report by the Open Society Foundations called it a "massive and widely ignored pattern of human rights abuse". A person must be found guilty "beyond reasonable doubt" in order to be convicted at a trial. However, pre-trial detention requires a lower threshold such as "reasonable suspicion". In most countries, the prosecution only need to prove that the charges are well-founded and that there is a sufficient threat that the defendant will commit another crime or undermine the judicial process. In the United States, the system of money bail means that a defendant can be detained even if neither of these threats can be identified, solely because nobody was willing or able to deposit the bail money for them.

In the Harvard Law Review, Stephanie Bibas also noted its impact on plea bargaining. Pretrial detention alters a defendant's incentives by making their best-case scenario not zero days in jail, but the length of time served pretrial. Therefore, a defendant may be more likely to plead guilty if the chance of acquittal is low, or if the expected sentence on a guilty plea is less than the amount of jail time that would be served pretrial. Pretrial detainees may also find it harder to mount an effective defence. This coercive effect on downstream outcomes such as taking plea bargains has been empirically demonstrated to be especially strong for people held pretrial on low-level charges (i.e., misdemeanors). The Open Society Foundation report also concluded that some detainees face worse conditions than convicted prisoners; for example the suicide rate is three times higher worldwide.

In the U.S., pretrial detention has been found to negatively affect local labor markets, especially in areas with high percentages of Black residents, suggesting racialized collateral impacts on employment. The July 2022 result of a New York Times examination of handwritten lists of names of Egyptian civilians imprisoned indefinitely in pre-trial detention exposed the mockery of the country's legal limits. There have been no public records of the number of detainees held in pre-trial detention, but according to the Times analysis, more than 4,500 people were held under such system of pre-trial detention, some even for more than six months. The Egyptian judicial system has been criticized for falsely charging political opponents of Abdel Fattah el-Sisi for 'terrorist links'. Often no formal complaint is filed or evidence is presented, preventing detainees from legally fighting in their defense before getting locked up. Meanwhile, human rights groups estimate that at least 60,000 political prisoners have been detained in Egypt, including pretrial detainees and those tried and sentenced for suspicion of having terror links or intolerable political points of view.

== See also ==
- Arbitrary arrest and detention
- Defence Regulation 18B
- Extrajudicial detention
- Immigration detention
- Law enforcement agency powers
- Nightwalker Statute
- Powers of the police in England and Wales
- Quasi-criminal
- Restorative justice
- Security certificate
- Summary jurisdiction
- Unlawful combatant
