= Headborough =

Person who was head of a tithing, and charged with maintaining order

In English law, the term headborough, head-borough, borough-head, borrowhead, or chief pledge, referred historically to the head of the legal, administrative, and territorial unit known as a tithing, which sometimes, particularly in Kent, Surrey and Sussex, was known as a borgh, borow, or borough. The office was rendered in Latin documents as capitalis plegius (chief pledge) or decennarius (tenner).

In the Anglo-Saxon system of frankpledge, or frith-borh, the headborough presided over the borhsmen in his jurisdiction, who in turn presided over the local tithingmen. Frankpledge was a system that existed to create an incentive for a tithing to police itself, and consequently, the headborough was effectively obliged to police his tithing, as well as dealing with more administrative matters. By the early 16th century, the office had evolved into the position of parish constable, a parochial officer subordinate to a hundred-constable.

Although the parish constable and hundred-constable share the term, the two roles had different functions, and origins. While the hundred-constable originated from senior military officers enforcing civil order, the parish constable had a wide range of civil administration functions in addition to a recognisable policing role. It is the hundred-constable which originated the term constable, and the parish constable acquired it by comparison; where the term headborough or chief pledge is used in contrast to a constable, the term constable is likely to refer specifically to the role of a hundred-constable.

In the sense of parish constable, the term is found in the induction to Shakespeare's The Taming of the Shrew (written c. 1590–92), when the Hostess of an alehouse, arguing with a drunken troublemaker, declares, "I know my remedie, I must go fetch the Headborough" (Induction, i); and again in Much Ado About Nothing (written c. 1598–9), where the dramatis personae describes Verges as a Headborough, subordinate to Constable Dogberry (Act 3, scene 5).
