= Statute of Winchester =

Act of Parliament of England

- Act of Parliament
- Parliament of England
- Long title: Statutum Wynton̄
- Citation: 13 Edw. 1. St. 2
- Territorial extent: England and Wales

Dates
- Royal assent: 8 October 1285
- Commencement: 8 October 1285 (Note: Start of session.)
- Repealed: 1 January 1970

Other legislation
- Repealed by: Continuance, etc. of Laws Act 1623; Criminal Statutes Repeal Act 1827; Criminal Statutes (Ireland) Repeal Act 1828; Criminal Law (India) Act 1828; Statute Law Revision Act 1863; Statute Law Revision (Ireland) Act 1872; Statute Law (Repeals) Act 1969
- Relates to: Metropolitan Police Act 1829; Statute of Northampton

Status: Repealed

Text of statute as originally enacted

The Statute of Winchester of 1285 (13 Edw. 1. St. 2; Latin: Statutum Wynton̄), also known as the Statute of Winton, was a statute enacted by King Edward I of England that reformed the system of Watch and Ward (watchmen) of the Assize of Arms of 1252, and revived the jurisdiction of the local courts. It received royal assent on 8 October 1285.

It was the primary legislation enacted to regulate the policing of the country between the Norman Conquest and the Metropolitan Police Act 1829 (10 Geo. 4. c. 44). Of particular note was the requirement to raise hue and cry, and that "the whole hundred … shall be answerable" for any theft or robbery, in effect a form of collective responsibility.

== Chapters ==
The Statute of Winchester was composed of six chapters:

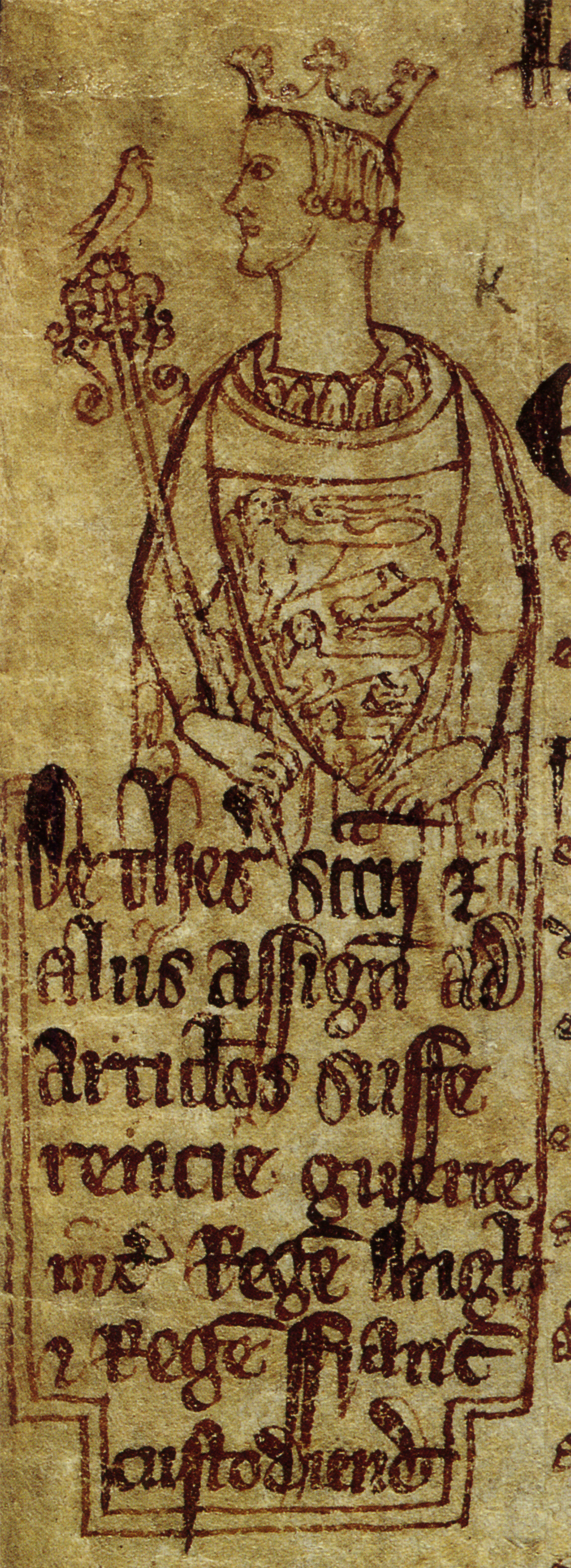
Drawing of Edward I, 1297/98

Chapter	Title	England and Wales	Ireland	India
1	Fresh Suit shall be made after Felons and Robbers from Town to Town, &c.	Criminal Statutes Repeal Act 1827 (7 & 8 Geo. 4. c. 27)	Statute Law (Ireland) Revision Act 1872 (35 & 36 Vict. c. 98)	Criminal Law (India) Act 1828 (9 Geo. 4. c. 74)
2	Inquiry of Felons and Robbers, and the County shall answer if they be not taken.	Criminal Statutes Repeal Act 1827 (7 & 8 Geo. 4. c. 27)	Statute Law (Ireland) Revision Act 1872 (35 & 36 Vict. c. 98)	Criminal Law (India) Act 1828 (9 Geo. 4. c. 74)
3	This Act shall be respited until Easter next.	Criminal Statutes Repeal Act 1827 (7 & 8 Geo. 4. c. 27)	Statute Law (Ireland) Revision Act 1872 (35 & 36 Vict. c. 98)	Criminal Law (India) Act 1828 (9 Geo. 4. c. 74)
4	At what Times the Gates of great Towns shall be shut, and when the Night Watch shall begin and end.	Criminal Statutes Repeal Act 1827 (7 & 8 Geo. 4. c. 27)	Statute Law (Ireland) Revision Act 1872 (35 & 36 Vict. c. 98)	Criminal Law (India) Act 1828 (9 Geo. 4. c. 74)
5	Breadth of Highways leading from one Market-Town to another.	Highways (No. 2) Act 1766 (7 Geo. 3. c. 42)	Statute Law (Ireland) Revision Act 1872 (35 & 36 Vict. c. 98)	Criminal Law (India) Act 1828 (9 Geo. 4. c. 74)
6	That View of Arms be made. Hue and Cry shall be followed. Fairs or Markets shall not be kept in Church-yards.	Statute Law (Repeals) Act 1969 (c. 52)	Statute Law (Ireland) Revision Act 1872 (35 & 36 Vict. c. 98)	

== Subsequent developments ==
The statute was confirmed by the Statute of Northampton (2 Edw. 3. c. 6).

Chapter 6 of the statute was repealed "as concerneth the having, repairing, and view of harness and arms." was repealed by section 11 of the Continuance, etc. of Laws Act 1623 (21 Jas. 1. c. 28).

== See also ==
- History of law enforcement in the United Kingdom

== Bibliography ==
- Henry Summerson, "The Enforcement of the Statute of Winchester, 1285–1327" (1992) 13 The Journal of Legal History 232 (No 3)
- Beatrice A Lees, "The Statute of Winchester and Villa Integra" (1926) 41 The English Historical Review 98 (No 161: January 1926)
