= Nightwalker statute =

Law requiring strangers at night to be arrested

Nightwalker statutes were English statutes, before modern policing, allowing or requiring night watchmen to arrest those found on the streets after sunset and hold them until morning. Foremost among them was the Statute of Winchester of 1285, which was re-adopted or amended several times until its repeal by the Criminal Statutes Repeal Act 1827. It stated that "if any stranger do pass by them, he shall be arrested until morning." Such power was interpreted to extend not only to the watchmen themselves, but also to assistants, and allowed the arrest and detention of all persons.

== See also ==
- Village lock-up
- Hue and cry
- Policing in the United Kingdom
- Security
- Security officer
- Watchman (law enforcement)
- Curfew
