= Frankpledge =

System of surety in medieval England

Frankpledge was a system of joint suretyship common in England throughout the Early Middle Ages and High Middle Ages. The essential characteristic was the compulsory sharing of responsibility among persons connected in tithings. This unit, under a leader known as the chief-pledge or tithing-man, was then responsible for producing any man of that tithing suspected of a crime. If the man did not appear, the entire group could be fined.

While women, clergy, and the richer freemen were exempt, otherwise all men over 12 years of age were organised in the system for mutual surety.

== Origins ==
The first mention of frankpledge comes in 1114–1118, with the Leges Henrici Primi (Laws of Henry I); but 12th-century figures like William of Malmesbury were keen to link it to pre-Norman times, and to the laws of Canute the Great. Some historians have indeed seen in the Anglo-Saxon frith-borh (literally "peace-pledge") the clear anticipation of frankpledge; others consider the 12th-century commentators were reading back into earlier times the later concept, and that the borh system was much less rigid and comprehensive than frankpledge. On this view, William the Conqueror, with the revival of murdrum with respect to the French invaders, played an important role in systematically and universally making the tithing adopt compulsory frankpledge, so as to increase and consolidate the power of the Normans and to establish a more stringent policy.

== Anglo-Saxon sureties ==
The borh was a system of surety whereby individuals – a family member, a master for servants, a lord for dependents – became responsible for producing others in court in event of misdemeanors. At the same time, late Anglo-Saxon society increasingly shared responsibility in legal matters in groups of ten. The group was referred to as a teothung or tything, i.e. a "thing (assembly) of ten men".

The tything was under the leadership of a tythingman chosen from among them, with the responsibility of producing in the court of justice any man of their number who was summoned. The first tythings were entirely voluntary associations, being groups formed through the mutual consent of their free members. The aspect of the system which initially prevented its being made universally compulsory was that only landed individuals could be forced to pay any fines which might be put upon the group:

the landless man was worthless as a member of a frith-borh, for the law had little hold over a man who had no land to forfeit and no fixed habitation. So the landless man was compelled by law to submit to a manorial lord, who was held responsible for the behaviour of all his "men"; his estate became, so to speak, a private frith-borh, consisting of dependents instead of the freemen of the public frith-borhs. These two systems, with many variations, existed side by side; but there was a general tendency for the freemen to get fewer and for the lords to grow more powerful.

— Albert F. Pollard, The History of England: A Study in Political Evolution

The tithing eventually became a territorial unit, part of the vill, while the eventual merger of borh and tithing underpinned the Norman frankpledge system. In its ultimate form, if an individual did not appear when summoned to court the remaining members of the tithing could swear an oath to the effect that they had no hand in the escape of the summoned man: they would otherwise be held responsible for the deeds of the fugitive and could be forced to pay any fines his actions had incurred. This examination of the members of the tything before the court is the origin of the phrase "view of frankpledge".

== Geography and profits of frankpledge ==
Frankpledge did not at first take place in Wales or eight Northern and border counties, but elsewhere was common in the area under the Danelaw, and in the south and southwest of England. By the time of Edward I, however, the sheriff's tourn also began to appear in shires like Northumberland and Cumberland.

The bi-annual view of frankpledge which was carried out by the sheriff involved payment of a tithing penny to the sheriff, as well as other opportunities for profit including fines: for this reason exemption from the tourn, or the private takeover of view of frankpledge by lords or boroughs, were valued privileges; while conversely the 1217 Magna Carta sought explicitly to restrict what the sheriff could legitimately demand of frankpledge.

== Later historical development ==
The frankpledge system began to decline in the 14th century. The extension of centralised royal administration on the one hand, and the increasing appropriation of view of frankpledge by private landlords of the other, both served to undermine the local system; as too did greater agrarian differentiation and mobility – a process exacerbated by the impact of the Black Death. Nevertheless, the system survived in places into the 15th century, although increasingly superseded by local constables – the former chief pledges – operating under the justices of the peace: their oversight represented the remains of view of frankpledge.

Ultimately, the principle behind frankpledge still remains in force, in England and Wales, with regard to riots. Until the Riot (Damages) Act 1886, members of each civil parish were, collectively, directly responsible for repaying any damages due to a riot within their area. Under the Act (and its 2016 replacement), the damages are indirectly levied on the local population via the police rate (now a component in council tax) in the relevant local authority area.

== See also ==
- Frith
- Collective responsibility
- Court leet
- Gonin Gumi for a similar institution in Tokugawa Japan
- Hue and cry
- Neighbourhood watch
- Norman yoke
