= Rōnin =

Samurai without a lord or master

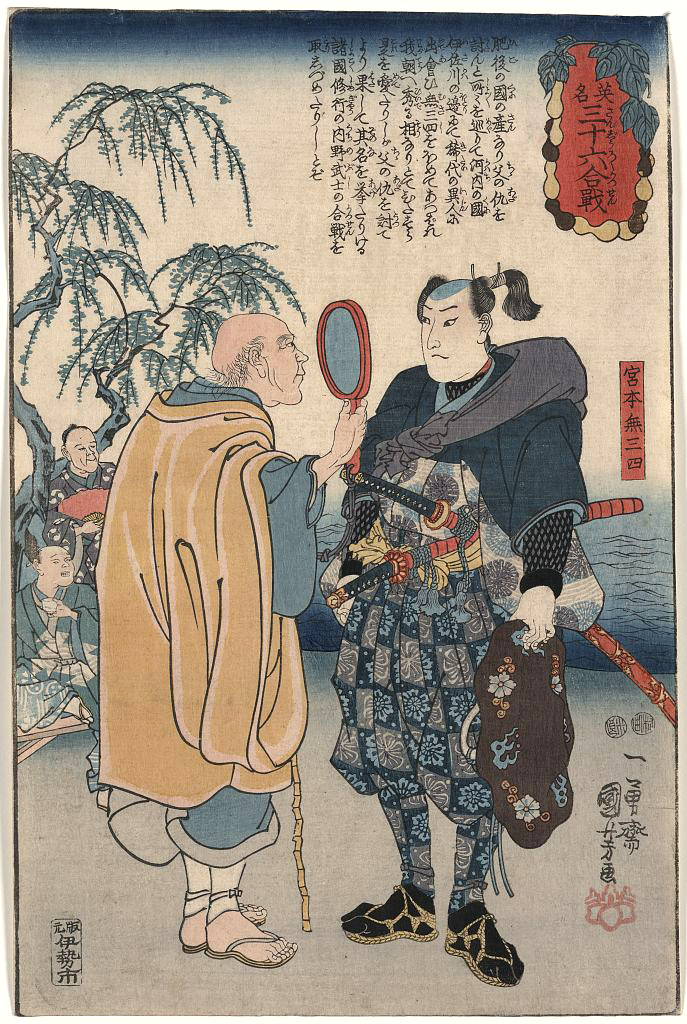
A woodblock print by ukiyo-e master Utagawa Kuniyoshi depicting famous rōnin Miyamoto Musashi having his fortune told

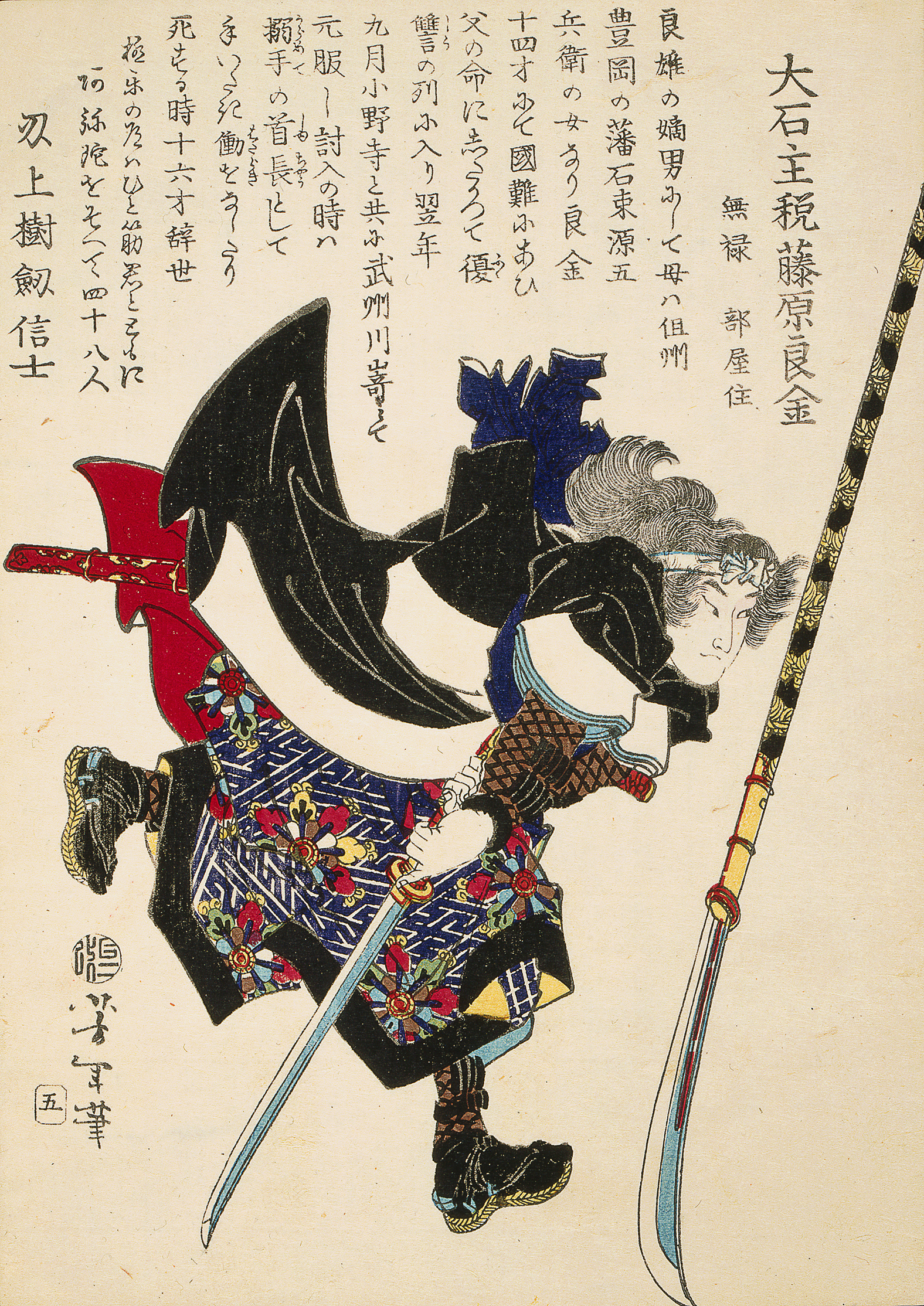
Ukiyo-e woodblock print by Yoshitoshi depicting Oishi Chikara, one of the forty-seven rōnin

In feudal Japan to early modern Japan (1185–1868), a rōnin (/ˈroʊnɪn/ ROH-nin; Japanese: 浪人, IPA: [ɾoːɲiɴ], 'drifter' or 'wandering man', lit. 'unrestrained or dissolute person') was a samurai who had no lord or master and, in some cases, had also severed all links with his family or clan. A samurai became a rōnin upon the death of his master, or after the loss of his master's favor or legal privilege.

In modern Japanese, the term is usually used to describe a salaryman who is unemployed or a secondary school graduate who has not yet been admitted to university.

== Etymology ==
The word rōnin is usually translated to 'drifter' or 'wanderer'; however, per kanji, rō (浪) means "wave" as on the water, as well as "unrestrained, dissolute", while nin (人) means "person". It is an idiomatic expression for 'vagrant' or 'wanderer', someone who does not belong to one place. The term originated in the Nara and Heian periods, when it referred to a serf who had fled or deserted his master's land. It later came to be used for a samurai who had no master. In medieval times, the ronin were depicted as the shadows of samurai, master-less and not honorable.

== Status ==
According to the Bushido Shoshinshu (the "Code of the Warrior"), a samurai was supposed to commit seppuku (also harakiri, "belly cutting", a form of ritual suicide) upon the loss of his master. One who chose not to honor the code was "on his own" and was meant to suffer great shame. The undesirability of rōnin status was mainly a discrimination imposed by other samurai and by daimyō, the feudal lords.

As with other samurai, rōnin were armed with two swords. Rōnin used a variety of other weapons as well. Some rōnin—usually those who lacked money—would carry a bō (staff around 1.5 to 1.8 m (5 to 6 ft)) or jō (smaller staff or walking stick around 0.9 to 1.5 m (3 to 5 ft)) or a yumi (bow). Most weapons would reflect the ryū (martial arts school) from which they came if they were students.

During the Edo period, with the shogunate's rigid class system and laws, the number of rōnin greatly increased; confiscation of fiefs during the rule of the third Tokugawa shōgun Iemitsu resulted in an especially large increase of their number. During previous ages, samurai were able to move between masters and even between occupations. They could also marry between classes. However, during the Edo period, samurai were restricted, and were—above all—forbidden to become employed by another master without their previous master's permission.

Because the former samurai could not legally take up a new trade, or because of pride were loath to do so, many rōnin looked for other ways to make a living with their swords. Those rōnin who desired steady, legal employment became mercenaries that guarded trade caravans, or bodyguards for wealthy merchants. Many other rōnin became criminals, operating as bandits and highwaymen, or joining organized crime in towns and cities. Rōnin were known to operate or serve as hired muscle for gangs that ran gambling rings, brothels, protection rackets, and similar activities. Many were petty thieves and muggers. The criminal segment gave the rōnin of the Edo period a persistent reputation of disgrace, with an image of thugs, bullies, cutthroats, and wandering vagrants. After the abolition of the Samurai, some of the ronin continued with their thuggery and their mercenary work and activities, such as participating in the infamous assassination of Korean Empress Myeongseong of the Joseon Dynasty in 1895, the Eulmi Incident.

== History ==
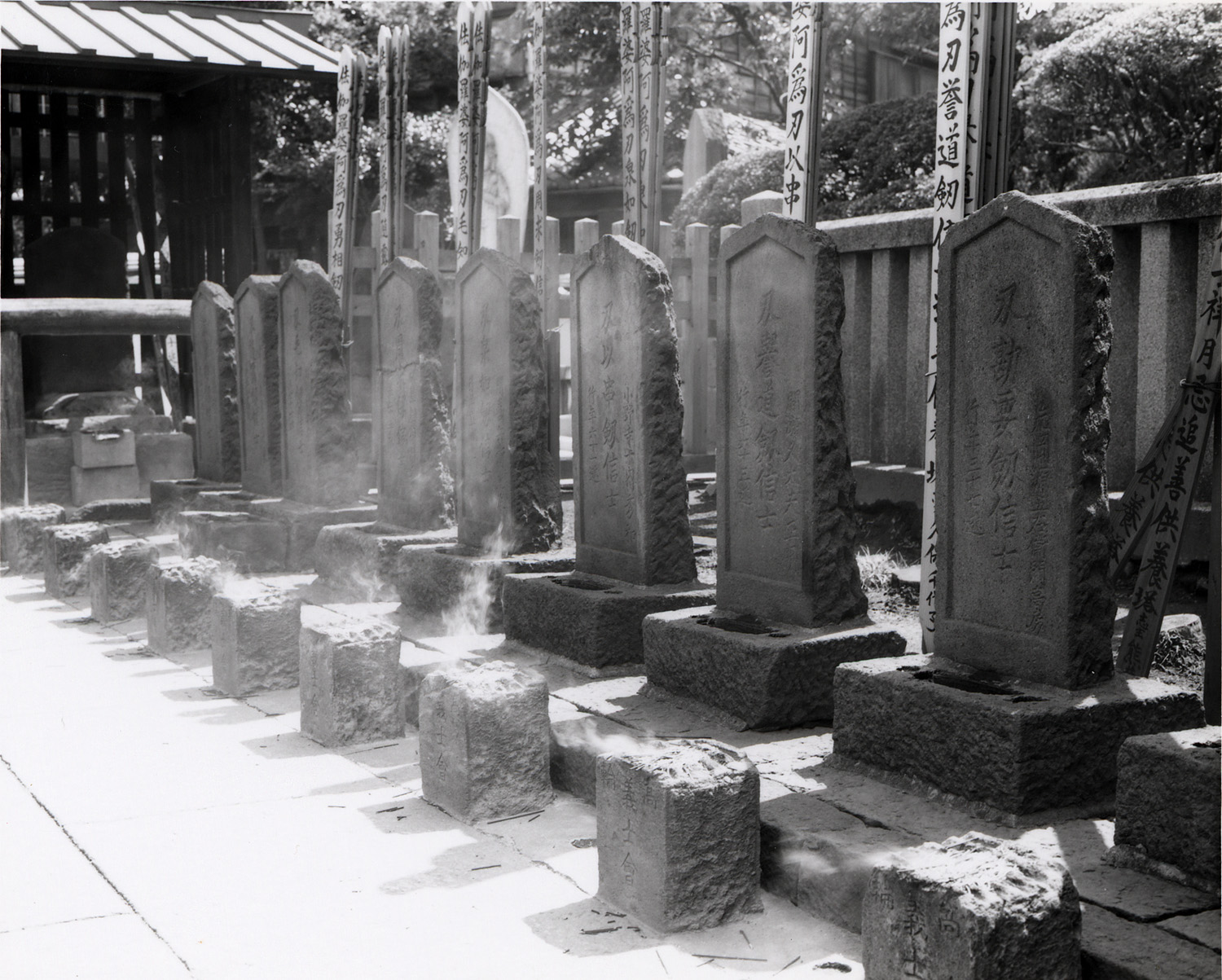
Graves of the forty-seven rōnin at Sengaku-ji

Until the Sengoku period, peasants accounted for the majority of daimyō armies, so they accounted for the majority of ronin.

Especially in the Sengoku period, daimyō needed additional fighting men, and even if a master had perished, his rōnin was able to serve new lords. In contrast to the later Edo period, the bond between the lord and the vassal was loose, and some vassals who were dissatisfied with their treatment left their masters and sought new lords. Many warriors served a succession of masters, and some even became daimyō. As an example, Tōdō Takatora served ten lords. Additionally, the division of the population into classes had not yet taken place, so it was possible to change one's occupation from warrior to merchant or farmer, or the reverse. Saitō Dōsan was one merchant who rose through the warrior ranks to become a daimyō.

As Toyotomi Hideyoshi unified progressively more significant parts of the country, daimyō found it unnecessary to recruit new soldiers. The Battle of Sekigahara in 1600 resulted in the confiscation or reduction of the fiefs of large numbers of daimyō on the losing side; consequently, many samurai became rōnin. As many as a hundred thousand rōnin joined forces with Toyotomi Hideyori and fought at the Siege of Osaka. In the ensuing years of peace, there was less need to maintain expensive standing armies, and many surviving rōnin turned to farms or became townspeople. A few, such as Yamada Nagamasa, sought adventure overseas as mercenaries. Still, the majority lived in poverty as rōnin. Their number approached half a million under the third Tokugawa shōgun Iemitsu.

Initially, the shogunate viewed them as dangerous and banished them from the cities or restricted the quarters where they could live. They also prohibited serving new masters. As rōnin found fewer options, they joined in the Keian Uprising of 1651. This forced the shogunate to rethink its policy. It relaxed restrictions on daimyō inheritance, resulting in fewer confiscations of fiefs, and it permitted rōnin to join new masters.

Not having the status or power of employed samurai, rōnin were often disreputable and festive, the group targeted humiliation or satire. It was undesirable to be a rōnin, as it meant being without a stipend or land. As an indication of the shame felt by samurai who became rōnin, Lord Redesdale recorded that a rōnin killed himself at the graves of the forty-seven rōnin. He left a note saying that he had tried to enter the service of the daimyō of Chōshū Domain but was refused. He killed himself, wanting to serve no other master and hating being a rōnin. On the other hand, the famous 18th-century writer Kyokutei Bakin renounced his allegiance to Matsudaira Nobunari, in whose service Bakin's samurai father had spent his life. Bakin voluntarily became a rōnin, and eventually spent his time writing books (many of them about samurai) and engaging in festivities.

In the 19th century, Emperor Meiji abolished the samurai class and any status rōnin had died with them.

== Notable rōnin ==
- Forty-seven rōnin
- Kyokutei Bakin
- Miyamoto Musashi
- Sakamoto Ryōma
- Yamada Nagamasa

== Portrayals in media ==
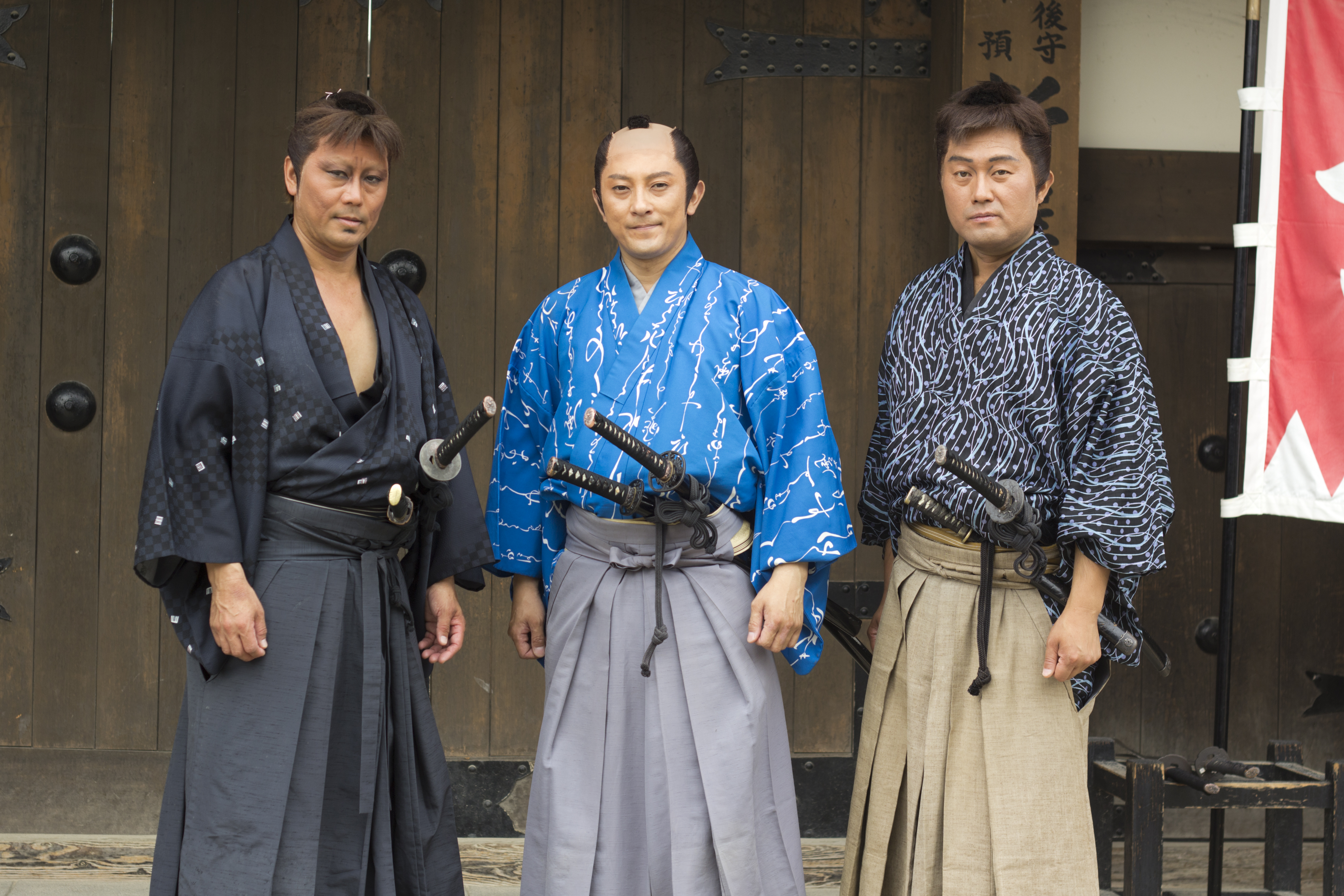
Actors portraying ronin on left and right, employed samurai in the middle. His chonmage makes him identifiable as an employed samurai.

Numerous modern works of Japanese fiction set in the Edo period cast characters who are rōnin. Ronin Jin from Samurai Champloo being one

=== Comics ===
- The moniker Ronin has often appeared in Marvel Universe comic series, and has been used by many characters such as Echo (Maya Lopez) and Hawkeye (Clint Barton).
- Usagi Yojimbo depicts an anthropomorphic rabbit rōnin main character, Miyamoto Usagi, whom Stan Sakai based partially on the famous swordsman Miyamoto Musashi.

=== Film ===
- Rōnin are often depicted in the jidaigeki of Akira Kurosawa, in particular Yojimbo, Sanjuro and Seven Samurai.
  - The 1954 film Seven Samurai follows the story of a village of farmers that hire seven rōnin to combat bandits who will return after the harvest to steal their crops.
  - The 1961 film Yojimbo tells the story of a rōnin who arrives in a small town where competing crime lords vie for supremacy. The two bosses each try to hire the newcomer as a bodyguard. The film inspired the Spaghetti Western films A Fistful of Dollars and Django, and spawned the 1962 sequel Sanjuro.
- The 1962 film Harakiri is set in Edo period of early 17th century Japan, and concerns two Ronin who present themselves at the palace of the Ii clan to request permission to commit ritual suicide.
- The 1998 film Ronin portrays former special forces and intelligence operatives who find themselves unemployed at the end of the Cold War. Devoid of purpose, they become high-paid mercenaries. There is also a direct comparison of the characters to the forty-seven rōnin.
- The film 47 Ronin is a 2013 Japanese-American fantasy action film depicting a fictional account of the forty-seven rōnin.
- The 2015 film, titled Last Knights, is a more stylized version of the story of the forty-seven rōnin, a joint production among the UK, Czech Republic and South Korea.

=== Television ===
- In the manga and anime Rurouni Kenshin, the hitokiri Himura Kenshin becomes a rōnin after the end of the Edo period, wandering for ten years in order to mend his sins and to complete the restoration.
- Samurai Jack, the protagonist of the eponymous animated television series, is technically a rōnin because he serves no master and is mostly seen wandering the land, searching for a resolution to his quest to defeat his nemesis, the shapeshifting master of darkness, Aku, after the latter opens a time portal that sends Jack into a future where Aku reigns supreme.
- In the 2004 anime series Samurai Champloo, one of the protagonists is the rōnin Jin. Along with the vagrant swordsman Mugen, he accompanies a young girl named Fuu on a quest to find the "samurai who smells of sunflowers".
- In the 2023 anime series Revenger, the protagonist becomes a rōnin after a meeting with a shadowy organization following an assassination attempt.

=== Video games ===
- The 2001 video game Battle Realms features a Ronin as the Tier 3 unit of the game’s Serpent Clan faction.
- The main character in each game of the Way of the Samurai series is always an archetypal ronin who wanders into the setting one day and must choose a faction to work with or find a way to unite them against a greater foe.
- The 2020 video game Ghost of Tsushima features many rōnin as part of the story, including Ryuzo (Leonard Wu), the childhood friend of the protagonist Jin Sakai.
- In the 2020 video game Genshin Impact, the first playable character from the nation of Inazuma, Kaedehara Kazuha, became a rōnin not too long before the game's events.
- The 2023 video game Honkai: Star Rail features Acheron, a rōnin from the fallen planet of Izumo, as a playable character starting from version 2.1.
- The protagonist of the 2024 video game Rise of the Rōnin is a rōnin navigating the tumultuous period of 19th-century Japan, making pivotal choices that influence the nation's future.
- In 2026, a new legendary card called the Ronin was added to the mobile game Clash Royale.

== See also ==
- Gonin Gumi – groups of households which united for collective protection against rōnin
- Japanese holdout
- Knight-errant, a similar figure in western literature
- Shinsengumi
- Youxia
