= Collective responsibility =

Responsibility of organizations, groups and societies

Collective responsibility or collective guilt is the responsibility of organizations, groups and societies. Collective responsibility in the form of collective punishment is often used as a disciplinary measure in closed institutions, such as boarding schools (punishing a whole class for the actions of one known or unknown pupil), military units, or prisons (juvenile and adult). The effectiveness and severity of this measure may vary greatly, but it often breeds distrust and isolation among their members. Historically, collective punishment is a sign of authoritarian tendencies in the institution or its home society.

In ethics, both methodological individualists and normative individualists question the validity of collective responsibility. Normally, only the individual actor can accrue culpability for actions that they freely cause. The notion of collective culpability seems to deny individual moral responsibility. Contemporary systems of criminal law accept the principle that guilt shall only be personal. According to genocide scholar A. Dirk Moses, "The collective guilt accusation is unacceptable in scholarship, let alone in normal discourse and is, I think, one of the key ingredients in genocidal thinking."

== In business ==
As the business practices known as corporate social responsibility (CSR) and sustainability mature and converge with the responsibilities of governments and citizens, the term "collective responsibility" is beginning to be more widely used.

Collective responsibility is widely applied in corporations, when an entire workforce may be held responsible for failing to achieve corporate targets (for example, profit targets), irrespective of the performance of individuals or teams which may have achieved or overachieved within their area. Collective punishment, even including measures that may further harm the prospect of achieving targets, is applied as a measure to 'teach' the workforce.

== In culture ==
The concept of collective responsibility is present in literature, most notably in Samuel Taylor Coleridge's "The Rime of the Ancient Mariner", a poem telling the tale of a ship's crew who died of thirst after they approved of one crew member's killing of an albatross.

1959's Ben-Hur and 1983's prison crime drama Bad Boys depict collective responsibility and punishment. The play An Inspector Calls by J. B. Priestley also features the theme of collective responsibility throughout the investigation process.

== In politics ==
In some countries with parliamentary systems, there is a convention that all members of a cabinet must publicly support all government decisions, even if they do not agree with them. Members of the cabinet that wish to dissent or object publicly must resign from their positions or be sacked.

As a result of collective responsibility, the entire government cabinet must resign if a vote of no confidence is passed in parliament.

== In law ==
Where two or more persons are liable in respect of the same obligation, the extent of their joint liability varies among jurisdictions.

== In religion ==
The Jewish faith recognizes two kinds of sin, offenses against other people, and offenses against God. An offense against God may be understood as a violation of a contract (the Covenant between God and the Children of Israel). Ezra, a priest and a scribe, was the leader of a large group of exiles. On his return to Jerusalem, where he was required to teach the Jews to obey the laws of God, he discovered that the Jews had been marrying non-Jews. He tore his garments in despair and confessed the sins of Israel before God, before he went on to purify the community. The Book of Jeremiah (Yirmiyahu [ירמיהו]) can be organized into five sub-sections. One part, Jeremiah 2–24, displays scorn for the sins of Israel. The poem in 2:1–3:5 shows the evidence of a broken covenant against Israel.

This concept is found in the Old Testament (or the Tanakh). Some examples of it are the account of the Flood, the Tower of Babel, Sodom and Gomorrah and in some interpretations, the Book of Joshua's Achan. In those records, entire communities were punished for the actions of the vast majority of their members. This was accomplished in as much as it is impossible to state whether there were no other righteous people, or that there were children who were too young to be responsible for their deeds.

Through this framework of inductive reasoning, both the account of the Flood and Sodom and Gomorrah do identify righteous people who happen to be the immediate or prospective family members of a prophet or prophet's nephew, along with them. These sequences of events are reconciled for the former example afterwards as the etiological basis for the reader's presumed good fortunes in the Noahic covenant with all living creatures, in which God promises never again to destroy all life on Earth (a category implicitly broader than the unrighteous) by flood and creates the rainbow as the sign of this "everlasting covenant between God and every living creature of all flesh that is on the earth", and for the latter example pre-empted with an explicitly stated numerical target of 9 other community members' lives to be put in peril (and to have an ostensibly lower number of homes destroyed, being located in Sodom) due to a hypothetical 10th's evaluation as unrighteous.

The practice of blaming the Jews for Jesus' death is the longest-lasting example of collective responsibility. In this case, the blame was not only cast upon the Jews of Jesus's time, it was also cast upon successive generations of Jews. This practice is documented in Matthew 27:25-66 New International Version (NIV) 25: "All the people answered, 'His blood is on us and on our children!'"

== Collective punishment ==
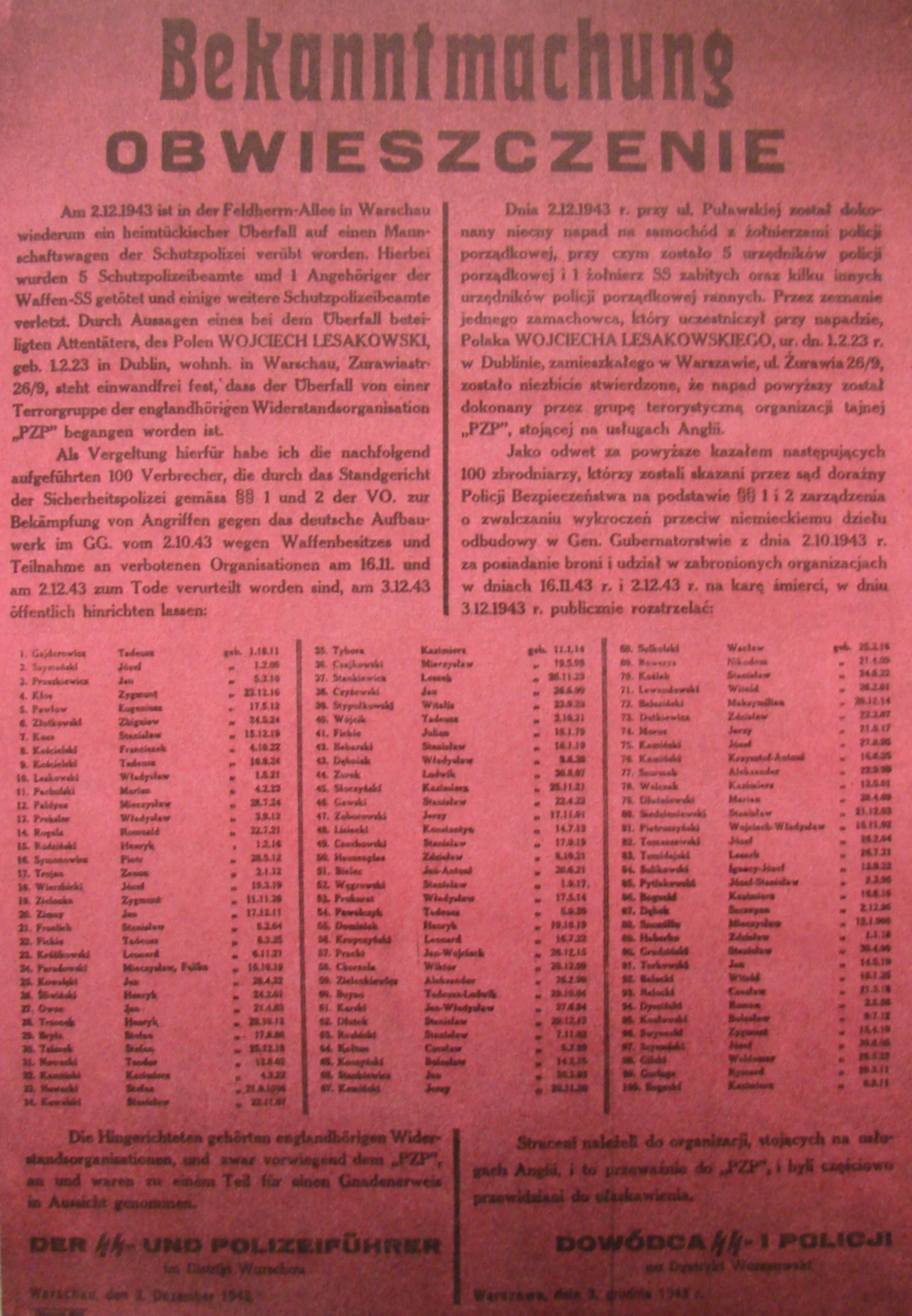
The announcement of the execution of 100 Polish roundup (Polish: łapanka) hostages as revenge for the assassination of five German policemen and one SS man by Armia Krajowa's guerrilla fighters (referred to in the text as "a Polish terrorist organization in British service"). Warsaw, 2 October 1943.

Collective responsibility in the form of collective punishment is often used as a disciplinary measure in closed institutions, such as boarding schools, military units, or prisons. Historically, collective punishment is a sign of authoritarian and/or totalitarian tendencies in the institution and/or its home society. For example, in the Soviet Gulags, all members of a brigada (work unit) were punished for bad performance of any of its members.

Collective punishment is also practiced in the situation of war, economic sanctions, etc., presupposing the existence of collective guilt. Collective guilt, or guilt by association, is the controversial collectivist idea that individuals who are identified as a member of a certain group carry the responsibility for an act or behavior that members of that group have demonstrated, even if they themselves were not involved. Contemporary systems of criminal law accept the principle that guilt shall only be personal.

During the occupation of Poland by Nazi Germany, the Germans applied collective responsibility: any kind of help which was given to a person of Jewish faith or origin was punished with death, and not only the rescuer, but his/her family was also executed. This was widely publicized by the Germans. During the occupation, for every German killed by a Pole, 100–400 Poles were shot in retribution. Communities were held collectively responsible for the purported Polish counter-attacks against the invading German troops. Mass executions of łapanka hostages were conducted every day during the Wehrmacht advance across Poland in September 1939 and thereafter.

Another example of collective punishment was applied after the war, when ethnic Germans in Central and Eastern Europe were collectively blamed for Nazi crimes, resulting in the committing of numerous atrocities against the German population, including killings (see Expulsion of Germans after World War II and Beneš decrees).

== Perception ==
Entitativity is the perception of groups as being entities in themselves (an entitative group), independent of any of the group's members.

== Ethics ==
In ethics, individualists question the idea of collective responsibility.

Methodological individualists challenge the very possibility of associating moral agency with groups, as distinct from their individual members, and normative individualists argue that collective responsibility violates principles of both individual responsibility and fairness.

— Stanford Encyclopedia of Philosophy

Normally, only the individual actor can accrue culpability for actions that they freely cause. The notion of collective culpability seems to deny individual moral responsibility. Does collective responsibility make sense? History is filled with examples of a wronged man who tried to avenge himself, not only on the person who has wronged him, but on other members of the wrongdoer's family, tribe, ethnic group, religion, or nation.

According to A. Dirk Moses, "The collective guilt accusation is unacceptable in scholarship, let alone in normal discourse and is, I think, one of the key ingredients in genocidal thinking."

== See also ==
- Crimes against humanity
- Diffusion of responsibility
- Extreme careerism
- Frankpledge
- Frith-borh
- German collective guilt
- Gonin Gumi
- Kin punishment
- Milgram experiment
- Moral disengagement
- NotAllMen
- Privilege (social inequality)
- Reprisal
- Self-hating Jew
- State responsibility
- War crime
- White guilt
