= Gonin Gumi =

Households during Edo Japan

The Gonin Gumi (五人組) were groups of five households that were held collectively responsible, in a manner similar to the Frith-borh in England, during the Edo period of Japanese history. All households in the shogunate were members of such a group, with all members of the group held responsible for the good conduct of all of the other members, and of their dependents. The responsibility included responsibility for crime and for non-payment of taxes.

== Overview ==
When the Tokugawa Shogunate came to power, they implemented a patriarchal system in Japan by reinforcing organized farming villages. The Gonin Gumi, which was introduced in January 1725, was an integral part of this policy. The Japanese official register declared that members of the collective are "duty bound to keep watch not only over the doings of their families, but also of their employees and tenants, as they are responsible to the Government for actions of these people." The Gonin Gumi were primarily aimed at combating the vagabondage and brigandage of the time, including mutual defence against the rōnin. Some sources underscored that this system was established for the purpose of taxation and the peasant households that constitute each Gonin Gumi were jointly held responsible for a member's inability to pay.

The Gonin Gumi was headed by a leader who was usually elected from within, but sometimes appointed from above. In Kyoto, an elder called machi toshiyori led the grouping, with three member-representatives helping him in the administration. The groups did not always contain five households. In some districts, the groups could comprise six, or even ten, households. The Gonin Gumi was reorganized annually and those who left and did not join other groups could be punished after a trial.

The Gonin Gumi are sometimes erroneously conflated with the ryo-donari (両隣) or muko-sangen (向こう三軒), which are informal social institutions. The Gonin Gumi were formal institutions, involved in law enforcement.

== See also ==
- Frith-borh
