= Tithing =

Historic English legal, administrative or territorial unit

A tithing or tything was a historic English legal, administrative or territorial unit, originally ten hides (and hence, one tenth of a hundred). Tithings later came to be seen as subdivisions of a manor or civil parish. The tithing's leader or spokesman was known as a tithingman.

== Etymology ==
The noun tithing breaks down as ten + thing, which is to say, a thing (an assembly) of the households who live in an area that comprises ten hides. Comparable words are Danish herredthing for a hundred, and English husting for a single household.

Sound changes in the prehistory of English are responsible for the first part of the word looking so different from the word ten. In the West Germanic dialects which became Old English, n had a tendency to elide when positioned immediately before a th.

The noun is not to be confused with the verb to tithe, its present participle tithing, nor the act of tithing, though they partly share the same origin.

== History ==
The term originated in the 10th century, when a tithing meant the households in an area comprising ten hides. The heads of each of those households were referred to as tithingmen; historically they were assumed to all be males, and older than 12 (an adult, in the context of the time). Each tithingman was individually responsible for the actions and behaviour of all the members of the tithing, by a system known as frankpledge. If a person accused of a crime was not forthcoming, his tithing was fined; if he was not part of the frankpledge, the whole town was subject to the fine.

Unlike areas dominated by Wessex, Kent had been settled by Jutes rather than Saxons, and retained elements of its historical identity as a separate and wealthy kingdom into the Middle Ages. While Wessex and Mercia eventually grouped their hundreds into Shires, Kent grouped hundreds into lathes. Sussex, which had also been a separate kingdom, similarly grouped its hundreds into rapes. The different choice of terminology continued to the level of the tithing; in Kent, parts of Surrey, and Sussex, the equivalent term was a borgh, borow, or borough (not to be confused with borough in its more usual sense of a chartered or privileged town); their equivalent to the tithingman was therefore a borsholder, borough-holder or headborough.

The Norman Conquest introduced the feudal system, which quickly displaced the importance of the hundred as an administrative unit. With the focus on manorial courts for administration and minor justice, tithings came to be seen as subdivisions of a manor. The later break-down of the feudal system did not detract from this, as the introduction of Justices of the Peace lead to petty sessions displacing many of the administrative and judicial functions of the manorial courts. By the Reformation, civil parishes had replaced the manor as the most important local administrative concept, and tithings came to be seen as a parish subdivision.

Frankpledge eventually evolved into both the Jury system and the petty constabulary, but tithings themselves had lost their practical significance, and fell into disuse. Despite this, active tithings continued to be found in some parts of rural England well into the 19th century, and tithings and hundreds have never been formally abolished.
