= Hue and cry =

Means of community policing

In common law, a hue and cry is a process by which bystanders are summoned to assist in the apprehension of a criminal who has been witnessed in the act of committing a crime (cf. in flagrante delicto).

== Etymology ==
It is possible that the term is an Anglicisation via Anglo-French of the Latin hutesium et clamor, meaning "a horn and shouting". Other sources indicate that it has always been a somewhat redundant phrase meaning an outcry and cry, though such "redundancy" is a feature of the legal doublet. "Hue" appears to come from the Old French huer, which means "to shout", and "cry" from Old French crier "to cry".

== History ==
Hue and Cry Act 1734
- Act of Parliament
- Parliament of Great Britain
- Long title: An Act for the Amendment of the Law relating to Actions on the Statute of Hue and Cry.
- Citation: 8 Geo. 2. c. 16
- Territorial extent: Great Britain

Dates
- Royal assent: 15 May 1735
- Commencement: 24 June 1735 (Note: Section 1.)
- Repealed: England and Wales: 1 July 1827; India: 1 March 1829
Other legislation
Amends	Statute of Westminster 1285; Hue and Cry Act 1584
Repealed by	England and Wales: Criminal Statutes Repeal Act 1827; India: Criminal Law (India) Act 1828
Relates to	Statute of Winchester; Hue and Cry Act 1748

Status: Repealed

Text of statute as originally enacted

Hue and Cry Act 1748
- Act of Parliament
- Parliament of Great Britain
- Long title: An Act for remedying Inconveniencies which may happen by Proceedings in Actions on the Statutes of Hue and Cry.
- Citation: 22 Geo. 2. c. 24
- Territorial extent: Great Britain

Dates
- Royal assent: 26 May 1749
- Commencement: 24 June 1749 (Note: Section 1.)
- Repealed: England and Wales: 1 July 1827; India: 1 March 1829
Other legislation
Amends	Hue and Cry Act 1584
Repealed by	England and Wales: Criminal Statutes Repeal Act 1827; India: Criminal Law (India) Act 1828
Relates to	Statute of Winchester; Hue and Cry Act 1734

Status: Repealed

Text of statute as originally enacted

By the Statute of Winchester of 1285 (13 Edw. 1. St. 2. c. 4), it was provided that anyone, either a constable or a private citizen, who witnessed a crime shall make hue and cry, and that the hue and cry must be kept up against the fleeing criminal from town to town and from county to county, until the felon is apprehended and delivered to the sheriff. All able-bodied men between the ages of fifteen and sixty, upon hearing the shouts, were obliged to assist in the pursuit of the criminal, which makes it comparable to the posse comitatus. It was moreover provided that "the whole hundred ... shall be answerable" for the theft or robbery committed, in effect a form of collective punishment. Those who raised a hue and cry falsely were themselves guilty of a crime.

The hue and cry was utilised in medieval European towns and villages as a means of community policing.

The oath of office for constables in the United States state of Tennessee specifically mentions that it is the duty of the constable to sound the hue and cry. (Note: T.C.A. 8-10-108(b): ...according to the 1960 federal census or any subsequent federal census, and in Fentress County and Hamblen County, every constable shall take an oath that the constable will well and truly serve the state in the office of constable; that the constable will cause the peace of the state to be kept, to the best of the constable's power; that the constable will arrest all such persons as go in the constable's sight armed offensively, or who commit any riot, affray, or other breach of the peace, or will use the constable's best endeavor, on complaint made, to apprehend all felons, rioters, or persons riotously assembled; and that, if such persons flee or make resistance, the constable will pursue, and make hue and cry, according to law; that the constable will faithfully, and without delay, execute and return all lawful process directed to the constable; and that the constable will well and truly, according to the constable's power and ability, do and execute all other duties of the office of constable.)

== Cultural references ==
- From the late 18th century until 1839, Hue and Cry was a principal or variant title for the weekly newspaper, containing details of crimes and wanted people, that afterwards became better known as the Police Gazette.
- Hue and Cry is a 1947 British film, which culminates in a call made to local children over the radio to join in the hunt to apprehend the villains.

== See also ==
- Amber alert – US based child abduction emergency alert system
- Citizen's arrest – Arrest made by a private citizen
- Clameur de haro – Ancient legal injunction of restraint still enforceable in Jersey and Guernsey
- History of law enforcement in the United Kingdom
- Misprision § Negative misprision – Failure to report a crime
- Nightwalker statute – Law requiring strangers at night to be arrested
- Posse comitatus – Aspect of common law
- Tar and feather – Form of public torture and humiliation
