= French Revolution from the summer of 1790 to the establishment of the Legislative Assembly =

The French Revolution was a period in the history of France covering the years 1789 to 1799, in which Republicans overthrew the Bourbon monarchy and the Roman Catholic Church perforce underwent radical restructuring. This article covers a period of time slightly longer than a year, from 14 July 1790, the first anniversary of the storming of the Bastille, to the establishment of the Legislative Assembly on 1 October 1791.

This article is a continuation of the abolition of feudalism in France, which covers the period of the Revolution from the abolition of feudalism to the Civil Constitution of the Clergy. Please see that article for background and historical context.

== From the anniversary of the Bastille to the death of Mirabeau ==
=== The anniversary of the Bastille ===
The National Constituent Assembly declared a celebration for 14 July 1790 on the Champ de Mars. By way of prelude to this patriotic fête, on 20 June, the Assembly, at the urging of the popular members of the nobility, abolished all titles, armorial bearings, liveries and orders of knighthood, destroying the symbolic paraphernalia of the ancien régime. This further alienated the more conservative nobles, and added to the ranks of the émigrés.

On the 14th, Talleyrand performed a mass; participants swore an oath of "fidelity to the nation, the law, and the king"; the king and the royal family actively participated in the celebrations, which went on for several days.

=== The Constituent Assembly continues ===
The members of the Estates-General had originally been elected to serve for a single year. By the Tennis Court Oath, the communes (representatives of the Third Estate) had bound themselves to meet continuously until France had a constitution, a goal which had not yet been achieved in the course of a year. Right-wing elements, such as the abbé Jean-Sifrein Maury, argued for a new election—by each of the three estates, separately—hoping that the events of the last year would encourage far more conservative representatives of at least the first two estates. Isaac le Chapelier described this at the time as "the hope of those who wish to see liberty and the constitution perish." Maury responded by characterizing the effort to avoid an election as "calculated to limit the rights of the people over their representatives." However, Mirabeau carried the day, asserting that the status of the Assembly had fundamentally changed, and that no new election would take place before completing the constitution: "It is asked how long the deputies of the people have been a national convention? I answer, from the day when, finding the door of their session-house surrounded by soldiers, they went and assembled where they could, and swore to perish rather than betray or abandon the rights of the nation... Whatever powers we may have exercised, our efforts and labours have rendered them legitimate..."

=== Intrigues ===
In late 1790, several small counter-revolutionary uprisings broke out and efforts took place to turn all or part of the army against the revolution. These uniformly failed. The court, in Mignet's words "encouraged every anti-revolutionary enterprise and avowed none", while negotiating with Mirabeau for more favorable treatment under a constitution, if one could not be prevented.

By this time, the royal family were living in the Tuileries, under the generally benevolent guardianship of Lafayette and his National Guards. These guards protected them from occasional popular outbursts, but also fended off several efforts by royalists to spirit them out of Paris.

=== Turmoil in the military ===
The army faced considerable internal turmoil: in Nancy, in August 1790, three regiments, those of Châteauvieux, Maître-de-camp, and the King's own regiment, rebelled against their chiefs. General Bouillé successfully put down the rebellion, which added to his (accurate) reputation for counter-revolutionary sympathies.

Under the new military code promotion depended on seniority and proven competence, rather than on nobility. In one detrimental consequence of this generally sound policy, large portions of the existing officer corps, seeing that they would no longer stand to gain promotion, left the army, and even the country, and attempted to stir up international diplomatic and even military opposition to the new, more democratic order. Others (such as Bouillé) stayed inside the military, but remained insincere in their oaths to the new regime, and became a counter-revolutionary threat from within.

=== Rise of the Clubs ===
This same period saw an increase of the importance of political "clubs" in French politics. Foremost among these was the Jacobin Club. While the Assembly met in Versailles, it was an unnamed group of Breton deputies to propose legislation. With the move to Paris, the group acquired a name and expanded its membership, first to other like-minded members of the Assembly, then to members of the general populace in Paris, and later throughout France. According to the 1911 Encyclopædia Britannica, by 10 August 1790 there were already one hundred and fifty-two affiliated clubs. Despite the Jacobins' later prominence during the Reign of Terror, in the summer and fall of 1790 they were still well within the mainstream of the popular or national party.

As the Jacobins became a broad popular organization, some of its founders abandoned it to form the alternative Club of 1789. Key members of this club included abbé Sieyès, Chapelier, Lafayette, and La Rochefoucauld. Mirabeau was active in both the Jacobins and the Club of 1789.

Royalists established first the short-lived Club des Impartiaux and later the Club Monarchique. They attempted unsuccessfully to curry public favor by distributing bread; nonetheless, they were the frequent target of protests and even riots, and were finally closed down by the Paris municipal authorities in January 1791.

=== Work on a constitution continues ===
Amidst these intrigues, the Assembly continued to work on developing a constitution. A new judicial organization made all magistracies temporary and independent of the throne. The legislators abolished hereditary offices, except for the monarchy itself. Jury trials started for criminal cases. The king would have the unique power to propose war, with the legislature then deciding whether to declare war.

On 31 October 1790 the Assembly abolished all internal trade barriers. Prior to that date, goods being shipped around France had to pass through various customs posts, often corresponding to the way territories had accreted to the French crown. After that date, all of France formed a single unit from the point of view of customs barriers.

The d'Allarde Law of 2 March 1791 suppressed guilds and masterships and freed any individual to practice a trade through the purchase of a license. The Le Chapelier Law of 14 June 1791 proscribed workers' organizations and banned strikes: the rising professionals, merchants and owners of industry had overthrown the power of the aristocracy on their own behalf, not that of their workers.

=== Death of Mirabeau ===
Mirabeau died 2 April 1791. In Mignet's words, "No one succeeded him in power and popularity." Historians argue whether his death was a major factor in the rise of factionalism and the decline of a consensus among the revolutionaries, or whether it merely coincided with these events, but the breakdown of that consensus is as clear as the death of the man.

Shortly before Mirabeau's death the Assembly considered, for the first time, legislation against the émigrés. Because nobles were leaving France and intriguing against the State, some deputies wished to declare "civil death" for all who left France. The debate pitted the safety of the state against the liberty of individuals to leave. Mirabeau carried the day against the measure, which he referred to as "worthy of being placed in the code of Draco." However, before the end of the year, the new French Legislative Assembly would adopt this "draconian" measure.

== The Flight to Varennes ==
For some time, the revolutionaries had feared that the royal family would attempt to escape Paris. When Louis tried to leave the Tuileries for Saint-Cloud at Easter 1791, in order to enjoy the ministrations of a nonjuring priest, they would not let him budge.

Encouraged by the émigrés to believe that revolutionary France was without effective military means of defense, representatives of Austria, Switzerland, Sardinia, and Spain, met at Mantua and on 20 May 1791 reached a secret agreement to go to war against France, supposedly on behalf of King Louis. However, when the plan was conveyed to the king, he rejected this potentially treacherous source of aid, casting his lot instead with General Bouillé, who condemned both the emigration and the Assembly, and promised him refuge and support in his camp at Montmédy.

On the night of 20 June 1791 the royal family fled the Tuileries. A carriage took them on the road to Châlons aiming towards Montmedy.

In the morning, their disappearance was discovered. Despite an angry crowd, the Assembly soon established their control of the situation, seizing executive power and obtaining oaths from the troops to the Assembly (rather than to the king).

The overconfident king had the imprudence to show himself, and was recognised and arrested at Varennes late on the 21st, and brought back to Paris under guard.

Pétion, Latour-Maubourg, and Barnave, representing the Assembly, met the royal family at Épernay and returned with them. From this time, Barnave became a counsellor and supporter of the royal family.

When they reached Paris, the crowd was silent. The Assembly provisionally suspended the king and kept him and Queen Marie Antoinette under guard.

== The last days of the National Constituent Assembly ==
=== Republicanism and the Champ de Mars massacre ===
From this point forward, the possibility not only of the forced abdication of this particular king but of the establishment of a republic entered the political discourse. To fend this off, a compromise was reached, but one that left Louis XVI little more than a figurehead: he was made to swear an oath to the constitution and it was decreed that he would be considered as abdicating, de facto, if he retracted the oath or if he headed an army for the purpose of making war upon the nation, or permitted any one to do so in his name. In case of such a de facto abdication, he would become a simple citizen, with no immunity from prosecution.

Jacques Pierre Brissot drafted a petition, denying the competency of the Assembly, appealing to the sovereignty of the nation, insisting that in the eyes of the nation Louis XVI was deposed since his flight, and demanding that if the monarchy were to continue it should be under a different monarch. On 17 July an immense crowd gathered at the altar of the country in the Champ de Mars to sign the petition. The Assembly called for the municipal authorities to "preserve the public tranquility." Under Lafayette's command, the National Guard at first dispersed the crowd without bloodshed, but the crowd re-formed, with Georges Danton and Camille Desmoulins giving fiery speeches. This time, when Lafayette and mayor Jean-Sylvain Bailly ordered the crowd to disperse, they were answered with a barrage of stones. Lafayette ordered his men to fire in the air; the crowd did not back down; Lafayette ordered his men to fire into the crowd. Reports on the number killed vary, but it may have been as many as fifty people. It has been debated upon, but many believe that the king caused this massacre. A note written in his handwriting communicated to Lafayette that if citizens arise, dispose of them.

In the wake of the massacre, the authorities closed many of the patriotic clubs, as well as radical newspapers such as Jean-Paul Marat's L'Ami du Peuple. Danton fled to England; Desmoulins and Marat went into hiding.

=== Renewed threat from abroad ===
Leopold II, Holy Roman Emperor, Frederick William II of Prussia, and the king's brother Charles-Phillipe, comte d'Artois met at Pillnitz Castle in Dresden, where on 27 August 1791 they issued a declaration which considered the cause of Louis XVI as their own, demanded his total liberty and the dissolution of the Assembly, and promised an invasion of France on his behalf if its conditions were refused.

If anything, the Declaration of Pilnitz further imperilled Louis. The French people were in no temper to be dictated to by foreign monarchs, and the threat of force merely resulted in the militarization of the frontiers. King Louis was saved for the present by the fact that those in the Assembly who favored a constitutional monarchy over a republic desperately needed him to continue in his role.

=== Constitution of 1791 ===
Even before the Flight to Varennes, the Assembly had determined that they themselves would be excluded from the legislature that was to succeed them, the Legislative Assembly. Mirabeau had opposed this limitation, and Adrien Duport memorably asked, "While every one is pestering us with new principles of all sorts, how is it overlooked that stability is also a principle of government?" but their views did not carry the day.

The Assembly now gathered the various constitutional laws they had passed into a single constitution, the Constitution of 1791. Showing remarkable fortitude in not using this occasion as an opportunity for major revisions, the Assembly submitted the constitution to the recently restored Louis XVI, who accepted it, writing "I engage to maintain it at home, to defend it from all attacks from abroad; and to cause its execution by all the means it places at my disposal."

Once again, the king and the Assembly seemed to have reconciled. The king's letter excited general approbation. Lafayette demanded and procured an amnesty in favor of those who were under prosecution for favouring the king's flight, or for proceedings against the revolution. The king addressed the Assembly and was enthusiastically applauded by them and by the spectators.

The close of the Assembly was set for 29 September 1791.

Mignet has written, "The constitution of 1791... was the work of the middle class, then the strongest; for, as is well known, the predominant force ever takes possession of institutions... In this constitution the people was the source of all powers, but it exercised none; it was entrusted only with election in the first instance, and its magistrates were selected by men chosen from among the enlightened portions of the community."
