= Prince of the Holy Roman Empire =

Former honorary title or title of ruler (1180–1806)

Heraldic crown of a prince of the Holy Roman Empire

Mantle and princely hat

Princely hat (Fürstenhut)

Prince of the Holy Roman Empire (Latin: princeps imperii, German: Reichsfürst, cf. Fürst) was a title attributed to a hereditary ruler, nobleman or prelate recognised by the Holy Roman emperor.

== Definition ==
Originally, possessors of the princely title bore it as immediate vassals of the emperor who held a fief (secular or ecclesiastical) that had no suzerain except the emperor. However, by the time the Holy Roman Empire was abolished in 1806, there were a number of holders of Imperial princely titles who did not meet these criteria.

Thus, there were two main types of princes: those who exercised Landeshoheit (sovereignty within one's territory while respecting the laws and traditions of the empire as well as an individual or shared vote in the College of Princes), and those whose title was honorary (the possessor lacking an immediate Imperial fief and/or a vote in the Imperial Diet). The first came to be reckoned as "royalty" in the sense of being treated as sovereigns, entitled to inter-marry with reigning dynasties. The second tier consisted of high-ranking nobles whose princely title did not, however, imply equality with royalty. These distinctions evolved within the Empire, but were codified by the Congress of Vienna in 1815 when it created the German Confederation and recognised a specific, elevated status (Standesherren or Mediatized Houses) for the mediatized princes of the defunct Empire.

The actual titles used by Imperial nobles varied considerably for historical reasons, and included archdukes, dukes, margraves, landgraves, counts palatine, princely counts (Gefürstete Grafen), as well as princes and prince-electors. Moreover, most of the German fiefs in the Empire (except electorships) were heritable by all males of a family rather than by primogeniture, the princely title (or whatever title the family used) being likewise shared by all agnatic family members, male and female.

== Imperial state ==
The estate of imperial princes or Reichsfürstenstand was established in a legal sense in the Late Middle Ages. A particular estate of "the Princes" was first mentioned in the decree issued by Emperor Frederick Barbarossa in 1180 at the Imperial Diet of Gelnhausen, in which he divested Duke Henry the Lion of Saxony and Bavaria. About fifty years later, Eike of Repgow codified it as an emanation of feudal law recorded in his Sachsenspiegel, where the lay princes formed the third level or Heerschild in the feudal military structure below ecclesiastical princes. Officially the princely states of the Holy Roman Empire had to meet three requirements:

- territorial rule and the jura regalia, i.e. sovereign rights, over an immediate fief of the Empire
- a direct vote (votum virile) and a seat in the Imperial Diet
- direct support for the expenses and the military ban of the Empire.

Not all states met all three requirements, so one may distinguish between effective and honorary princes of the Holy Roman Empire.

The princes of the Empire ranked below the seven prince-electors (Kurfürsten; archaic spelling Churfürsten) designated by the Golden Bull of 1356 (and later electors), but above the Reichsgrafen (imperial counts), Freiherren (barons) and Reichsprälaten (imperial prelates), who formed with them the Imperial Diet assemblies, but held only collective votes. Around 1180, the secular princes comprised the Herzöge (dukes) who generally ruled larger territories within the Empire in the tradition of the former German stem duchies, but also the counts of Anhalt and Namur, the landgraves of Thuringia and the margraves of Meissen.

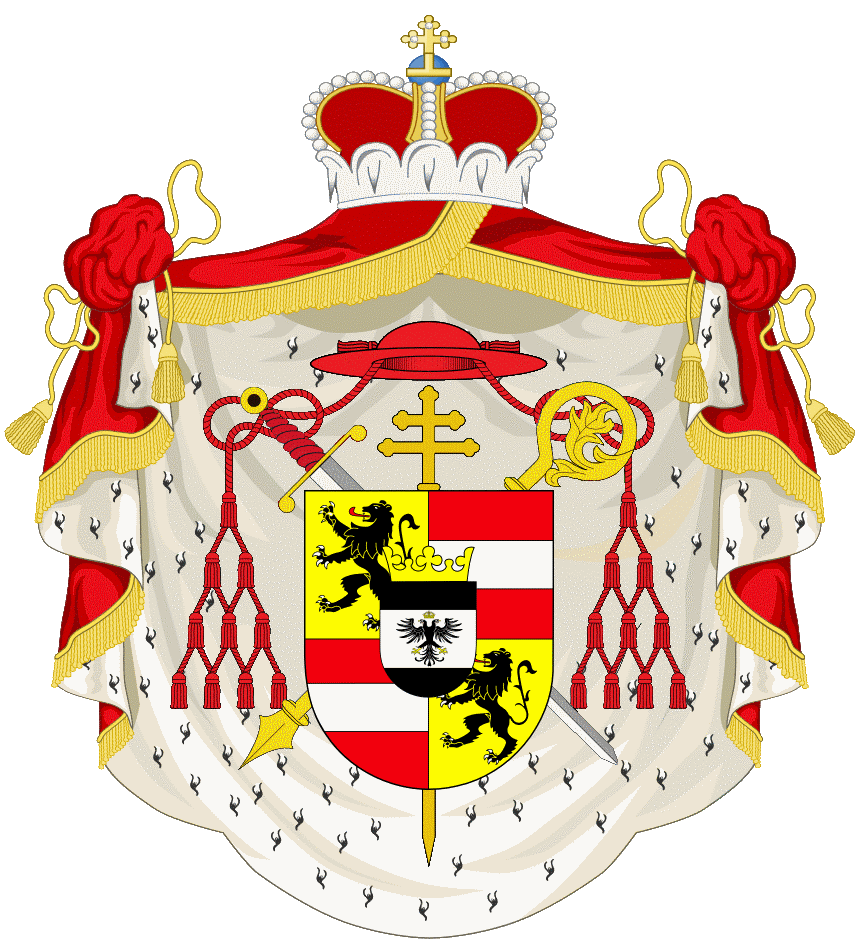
Coat of arms of Hieronymus von Colloredo, Prince-Archbishop of Salzburg

From the 13th century onwards, further estates were formally raised to the princely status by the emperor. Among the most important of these were the Welf descendants of Henry the Lion in Brunswick-Lüneburg, elevated to princes of the Empire and vested with the ducal title by Emperor Frederick II in 1235, and the landgraves of Hesse in 1292. The resolutions of the Diet of Augsburg in 1582 explicitly stated that the status was inextricably linked with the possession of a particular Imperial territory. Later elevated noble families like the Fürstenberg, Liechtenstein or Thurn und Taxis dynasties subsequently began to refer to their territory as a "principality" and assumed the awarded rank of a prince (Fürst) as a hereditary title. Most of the counts who ruled territories were raised to Princely rank in the decades before the end of the Empire in 1806.

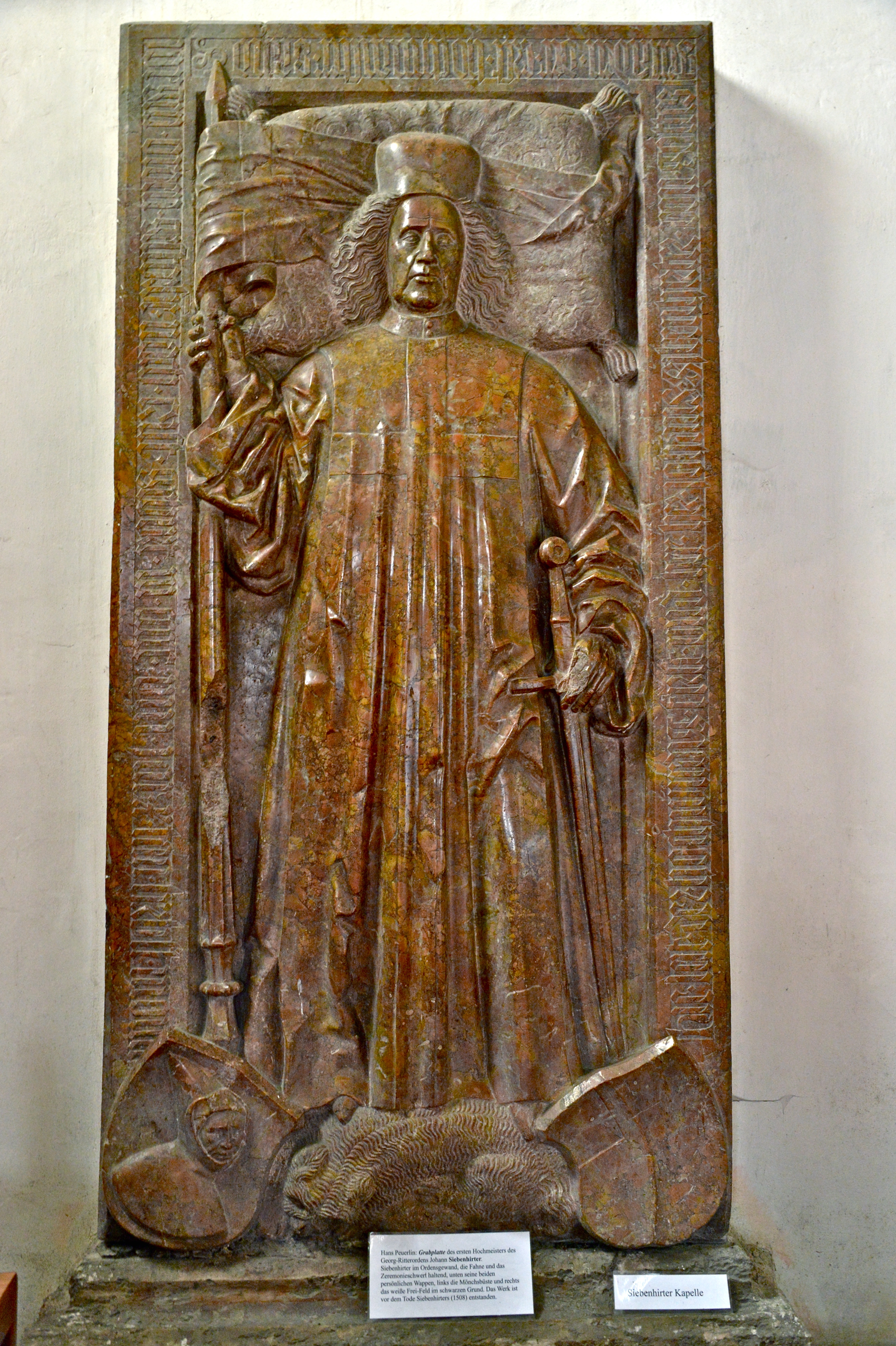
Grave of the Prince of the Holy Roman Empire Johann Siebenhirter (1420–1508) at the parish church in Millstatt, Austria

Ecclesiastical princes were the Prince-Bishops (including the prince-archbishops of Besançon, Bremen, Magdeburg and Salzburg) as well as the actual prince-abbots. They comprised a number of political entities which were secularized and mediatized after the 1648 Peace of Westphalia.

== Honorary title ==
The honorary status of prince of the Holy Roman Empire might be granted to certain individuals. These individuals included:

- Rulers of states of the Empire who did not hold an individual seat in the princely chamber of the Imperial Diet, but held a seat as a count and shared with other counts in the one vote exercised by each of the four regional comital councils or Grafenbanken.
- Sovereigns outside the Empire, such as the Sovereign Military Order of Malta.
- Nobles allowed to bear the princely title, but who had neither a vote nor a seat in the Imperial Diet, individual or shared, such as the House of Kinsky. This included nobles who lacked immediacy, but who were allowed, motu proprio, by the emperor to enjoy the title and rank of prince of an Imperial state. Although this courtesy tended to become hereditary for families, the right to princely status was called Personalist (personal) and could be revoked by the emperor.
- Foreigners of note, such as the princes of Belmonte, the Chigi, the Orsini, the Princes of Broglie, the Princes Orloff, the Princes Potemkin, the Princes Lubomirski, the Princes Radziwiłł, or the Princes Ruspoli.
- Subjects of the Empire who were given a princely title by an emperor, but who held no territory or sovereignty at all. This status was occasionally granted to the morganatic wives and children of electoral and immediate families, allowing them to share in the husband/father's princely title, but not his princely rank and privileges (e.g., Frederick William von Hessenstein).

== See also ==
- List of states in the Holy Roman Empire
- List of Imperial Diet participants (1792)
- German mediatization
