= Isaac René Guy le Chapelier =

French jurist and politician

Isaac Le Chapelier
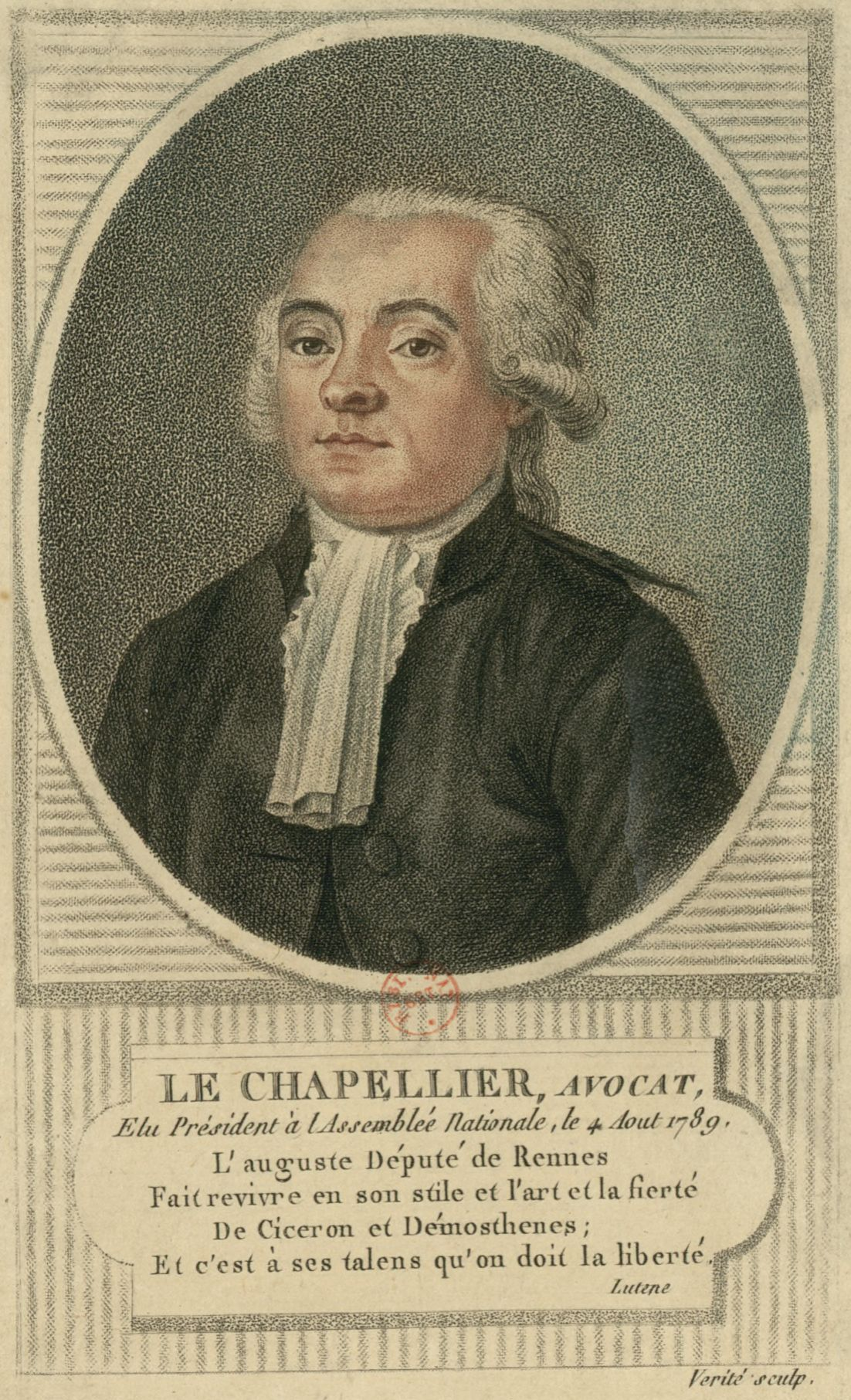
- Le Chapelier

Member of the National Assembly for Ille-et-Vilaine
- In office 9 July 1789 – 30 September 1791
- Constituency: Rennes

Deputy to the Estates General for Third Estate
- In office 5 May 1789 – 9 July 1789
- Constituency: Rennes

Personal details
- Born: Isaac René Guy le Chapelier; 12 June 1754 Rennes, Brittany, France
- Died: 22 April 1794 (aged 39) Paris, Seine, France
- Party: Breton (1789); Jacobin (1789–1791); Feuillant (1791–1792)
- Spouse: Marie-Esther de la Marre
- Education: University of Rennes
- Profession: Lawyer

Isaac René Guy Le Chapelier (12 June 1754 – 22 April 1794) was a French jurist and politician of the Revolutionary period.

== Biography ==
Le Chapelier was born in Rennes in Brittany, where his father was bâtonnier of the corporation of lawyers, a title equivalent to President of the Bar. He entered the law profession, and was a noted orator. In 1775, Le Chapelier was initiated as a freemason at the Grand Orient de France.

In 1789 he was elected as a deputy to the Estates General by the Third Estate of the sénéchaussée of Rennes. He adopted radical opinions. His influence in the National Constituent Assembly was considerable: he served as president 3–17 August 1789, presiding over the famous all-night session of 4–5 August, during which feudalism was abolished in France, and in late September 1789 was added to the Constitutional Committee, where he drafted much of the Constitution of 1791.

Le Chapelier introduced a motion in the National Assembly which prohibited guilds, trade unions, and compagnonnage, and which also abolished the right to strike. The law did not "abolish the right to strike", no right to not turn up for work and not be dismissed, had ever existed in French law, a "right" that did not exist, and had never existed, can not have been "abolished" by the law of 1791. Le Chapelier and other Jacobins interpreted demands by Paris workers for higher wages as contrary to the new principles of the Revolution. The measure was enacted law on 14 June 1791 in what became subsequently known as the Le Chapelier Law. The law effectively barred guilds and trade unions in France until 1864. There had been an effort, by Turgot, to abolish the compulsory guilds (producer cartels) in 1776 - but it did not go into effect. The Estates General proclaimed against the guilds on August 4, 1789 - but the end of these compulsory producer cartels did not come till 1791.

In May, 1789, when the Estates General were still meeting, Le Chapelier was one of the founders of the Breton Club, a collection of deputies initially all hailing from his home province of Brittany, but which in the weeks to come drew all sorts of deputies sharing a more radical ideology. After the October Days (5–6 October) and the National Assembly's move to Paris, the Breton Club rented a Dominican monastery and became the Jacobin Club, of which Le Chapelier was the first president.

Like many radical deputies, Le Chapelier wished for the central role played by such popular societies early in the French Revolution to come to an end with the settling of the state and the pending promulgation of a new constitution. This conviction was increased by the Champs de Mars Massacre of 17 July 1791. Within days, Le Chapelier joined the mass exodus of moderate deputies abandoning the Jacobin club in favour of a new organisation, the Patriotic Society of 1789 and later the Feuillant club.

Le Chapelier, in his capacity as chairman of the Constitutional Committee, presented to the National Assembly in its final sessions a law restricting the rights of popular societies to undertake concerted political action, including the right to correspond with one another. It passed 30 September 1791. By the virtue of obeying this law, the moderate Feuillants embraced obsolescence; the radical Jacobins, by ignoring it, emerged as the most vital political force of the French Revolution. The popular society movement, largely founded by Le Chapelier, was thus inadvertently radicalised contrary to his original intentions.

During the Reign of Terror, as a suspect for having had links with the Feuillants, he temporarily emigrated to Great Britain, but returned to France in 1794, in an unsuccessful effort to prevent the confiscation of his assets. He was arrested, and guillotined in Paris on the same day as Guillaume-Chrétien de Lamoignon de Malesherbes.

== In popular culture ==
He is a character in Rafael Sabatini's historical novels Scaramouche (1921) and Scaramouche the King-Maker (1931).

== Bibliography ==
- 1790 - Opinion de M. Le Chapelier sur le droit de faire la paix et la guerre
- 1791 - Rapport fait par M. Le Chapelier, au nom du Comité de Constitution, sur la pétition des auteurs dramatiques, dans la séance du jeudi 13 janvier 1791, avec le décret rendu dans cette séance
