= Grafschaft =

A Grafschaft was originally the name given to the administrative area in the Holy Roman Empire over which a count, or Graf, presided as judge. It is often, therefore, translated as 'county'. The term has survived as a placename in German-speaking countries, for example, in Germany and in Switzerland.

According to the early Saxon legal document, the Sachsenspiegel which dates to around 1230, the Graf or count is a special judge (Sonderrichter) who, in the name of the king may preside at a juridical court, in certain cases, under the king's ban, i.e. king's authority. The type of 'ban' cases derived from the nature of the kingdom:

The king elects a man as judge over property and fiefs and over the life of each and every person

— Ssp. Ldr. III/52,2

From that followed the exclusive responsibility of the king – and thus the count – to deal with allegations against the nobility. As part of the court "under the king's ban" there was a bench of jurors made up of the nobility, the Schöffenbarfreien. The area of the county was roughly that of modern rural German districts or counties (Landkreise). On the emergence of states in the Late Middle Ages, the acquisition and thus mediatisation of the counties by the territorial princes played an important role. The beginning of the late medieval trend towards large territorial lordships in the 14th century was simultaneously the end of the Grafschaft of the late and high Middle Ages.

In 1521 there were 144 imperially immediate (unmittelbar) Grafschaften in the Holy Roman Empire, the so-called imperial counties or Reichsgrafschaften.

Several rural Landkreise in Lower Saxony, whose territorial history goes back to the Grafschaften, bear this title in their official names; after the municipal reforms at the end of the 1970s, only the county of Landkreis Grafschaft Bentheim retains the name.

Not to be confused with Grafschaften are the Markgrafschaften ("margraviates"), Pfalzgrafschaften ("counties palatine" or "palatinates") or Landgrafschaften ("landgraviates"), which had the same status as duchies. The present-day German federal states of Brandenburg and Saxony were once margraviates; Thuringia and Hesse were landgraviates. The Burggrafen ("burggraves" or "burgraves"), who ruled Burggrafschaften ("burggraviates" or "burgraviates"), were of equivalent rank to a Graf but tended to rule much smaller territories centred on a castle (Burg), although some ruled much larger areas (e.g. the Burgraviate of Nuremberg).

== See also ==
- Graf, Markgraf, Landgraf, Pfalzgraf, Reichsgraf, Gaugraf, Burggraf
