= Communal oven =

Feudal institution in medieval France

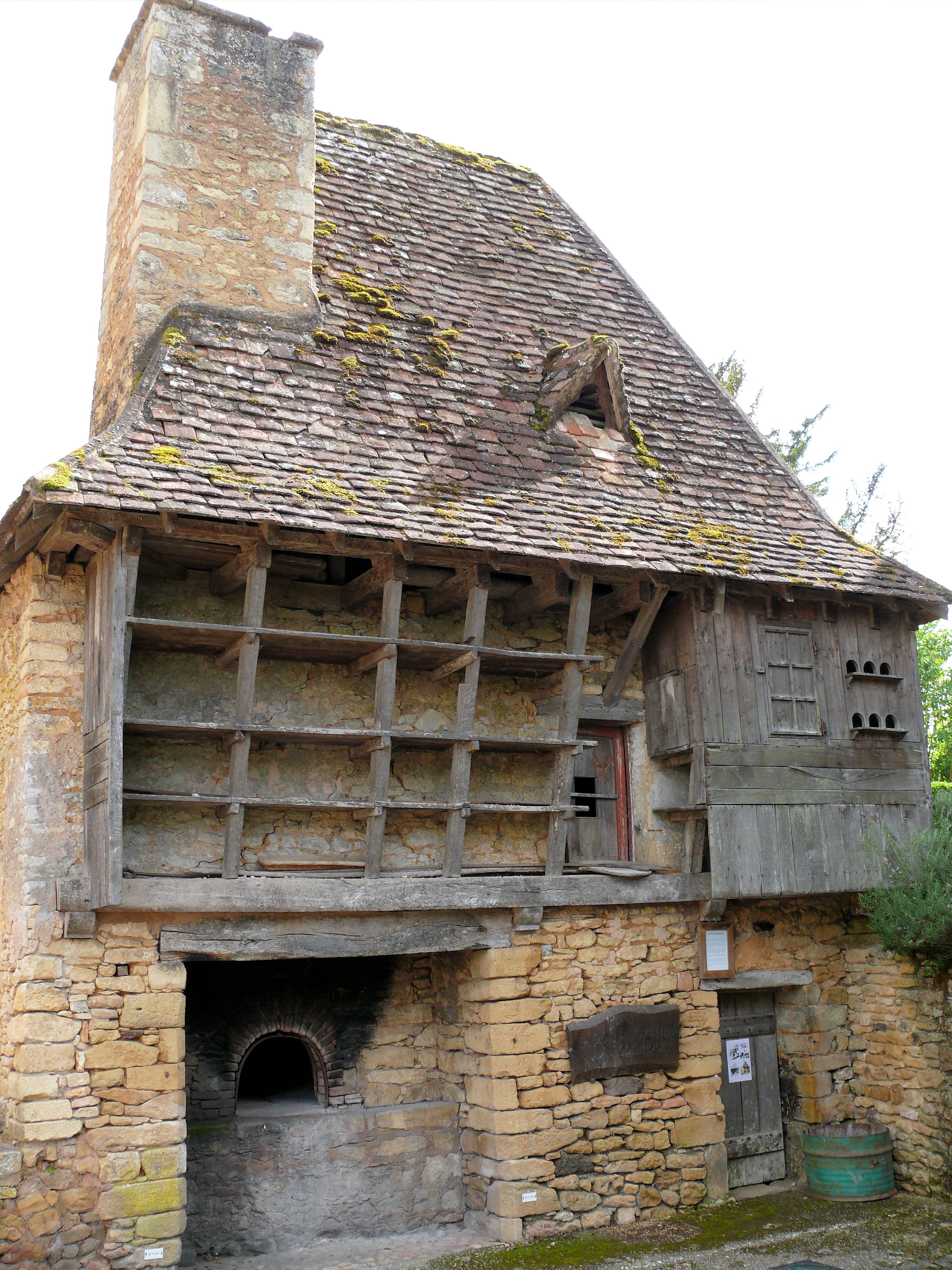
Four banal at Urval, Dordogne, France

The four banal (English: common oven) was a feudal institution in medieval France. The feudal lord (French: seigneur) often had, among other banal rights, the duty to provide and the privilege to own all large ovens within his fief, each operated by an oven master or fournier. In exchange, personal ovens were generally outlawed and commoners were thus compelled to use the seigniorial oven to bake their bread. Such use was subject to payment, in kind or money, originally intended merely to cover the costs associated to the construction, maintenance and operation of the oven. Seigniorial ovens were masonry ovens built on the Roman plan and were large enough to hold an entire community's ration of bread.

For example, in the hamlet of Nan-sous-Thil (Côte-d'Or, France), the villagers were required to bake their bread at the four banal, as at home they were permitted only a small oven placed under the hood of the chimneypiece, for baking "gâteau et flan". Those regulations sought to reduce the risk of fire where thatched cottages huddled together. The danger was real, as demonstrated in 1848 when a full quarter of the neighbouring hamlet of Thil-la-Ville was consumed by a fire that ignited from sparks when a housewife heated her oven.

The oven design, but not necessarily the feudal monopoly on oven operation, was carried to French colonies. In New France, it was the only banal right commonly established and the oven's fortified construction also served to protect the colonists during skirmishes.

The four banal system seems to have died out in France during the 18th century, though it was a time when some dormant seigneurial rights were being insisted upon by an aristocracy hard-pressed for cash, as an official mémoire suggests:

The lord will do well not to raise the question, taking into consideration that times have changed, seeing the scarcity of wood and the poverty of the populace, whom the exercise of this right seems to greatly trouble. If it is through the negligence of the lord that this right has fallen into desuetude, let everyone profit from it without injury".

Traditions surrounding the four banal may have lasted as late as World War II. In some rural areas of France, the old communal ovens are still extant (illustration) and are sometimes used for community celebrations.

== See also ==
- Bakehouse (building)
