= Arrière-ban =

General proclamation to defend the state in the Kingdom of France

In medieval and early modern France, the arrière-ban (Latin retrobannum) was a general proclamation whereby the king (or duke) summoned to war all the vassals of his vassals. The term is a folk-etymological correction of Old French herban (attested 1101), from Germanic here (army) and ban (proclamation); compare German Heerbann.

Although in theory, the arrière-ban depended on feudal relations, in practice it amounted to a general levy on all able-bodied males in the kingdom. In theory, this included all men between the ages of 18 and 60 years; in practice such a wide-ranging levy was never carried out for fear of conjuring an ill-suited mob. Most arrière-bans were in fact local in nature. Conscription could be commuted by a money payment, which became an important source of revenue for the crown.

The Duke of Normandy retained the right of arrière-ban and used it routinely down to 1204. The distinction between the public obligation of freemen and the feudal obligation of the duke's vassals was maintained, but in practice the arrière-ban may have been used mainly to call up the better armed subtenants of his vassals.

Considered archaic and appropriate only in emergencies, the royal arrière-ban was re-instituted in France by Philip IV (1285–1314), who asserted his right to military service from the tenants and vassals of his vassals. The arrière-ban was proclaimed throughout the Kingdom of France on 30 April 1337, at the start of the Hundred Years' War. Thereafter, there were numerous summons, causing the practice to become ineffective and unpopular. After the disaster at Poitiers, the arrière-ban was not used for some decades as Charles V introduced a more permanent fighting force. It reappeared after 1410. Its practice continued into the early modern period, notably during the Thirty Year's War. In 1636, when the Spanish approached Paris, Louis XIII successfully gathered thousands of noblemen to defend the city by calling ban (of his vassals) and the arrière-ban (of all free men), allowing him to repel the Spanish.

== See also ==
- Commission of array
