= Imperial ban =

Punishment in the Holy Roman Empire

The imperial ban (German: Reichsacht, pronounced [ˈʁaɪçsˌʔaxt]) was a form of outlawry in the Holy Roman Empire. At different times, it could be declared by the Holy Roman Emperor, by the Imperial Diet, or by courts like the League of the Holy Court (Vehmgericht) or the Reichskammergericht.

People under imperial ban, known as Geächtete (from about the 17th century, colloquially also as Vogelfreie, lit. "free as a bird"), lost all their rights and possessions. They were legally considered dead, and anyone was allowed to rob, injure, or kill them without legal consequences. The imperial ban automatically followed the excommunication of a person, as well as extending to anyone offering help to a person under the imperial ban.

Those banned could reverse the ban by submitting to the legal authority. The Aberacht, a stronger version of the imperial ban, could not be reversed.

The imperial ban was sometimes imposed on whole Imperial Estates. In that case, other estates could attack and seek to conquer them. The effect of the ban on a city or other Estate was that it lost its Imperial immediacy and in the future would have a second overlord in addition to the emperor.

Famous people placed under the imperial ban included:

- 1180 - Henry the Lion, for refusing military support to Frederick I, Holy Roman Emperor against the cities of the Lombard League.
- 1225 - Count Frederick of Isenberg, for killing his uncle Engelbert II of Berg, Archbishop of Cologne.
- 1235 - King Henry (VII) of Germany, for his rebellion against his father the Emperor Frederick II.
- 1276 - King Ottokar II of Bohemia, for his capture of imperial lands from Rudolph I.
- 1309 - John Parricida, for the murder of his uncle King Albert I of Germany.
- 1415 - Frederick IV, Duke of Austria for aiding the flight of Antipope John XXIII from the Council of Constance.
- 1512 and 1518 - Götz von Berlichingen, the first time for robbery, the second for kidnapping.
- 1521 - Martin Luther and his supporters, for claiming that some doctrines practiced by the Catholic Church were contrary to the Bible or had no biblical basis.
- 1546 - John Frederick I, Elector of Saxony and Philip I, Landgrave of Hesse, for leading the Schmalkaldic League.
- 1566 - Wilhelm von Grumbach, for insurgency.
- 1621 - Frederick V, Elector Palatine, and his supporters Prince Christian I of Anhalt-Bernburg and Georg Friedrich of Hohenlohe-Neuenstein-Weikersheim, for seizing power in Bohemia.
- 1635 - William V, Landgrave of Hesse-Kassel, for not accepting the Peace of Prague and for supporting France
- 1706 - Maximilian II Emanuel, Elector of Bavaria, and Joseph Clemens, Elector of Cologne, for supporting France in the War of the Spanish Succession (ban reversed in 1714).
- 1708 - Ferdinando Carlo Gonzaga, Duke of Mantua and Montferrat, for supporting France in the War of the Spanish Succession. The Duchy of Mantua was confiscated by the emperor as a result.
- 1793 - Georg Forster, for collaboration with the French Republic.

The imperial ban imposed by the Emperor Rudolf II on the city of Donauwörth after an anti-Catholic riot was one of the incidents leading to the Thirty Years' War.

An imperial ban on Bremen preceded the 1654 Swedish attack on Bremen.

== See also ==
- King's ban, a royal order or prohibition in the Holy Roman Empire.
