= Heerschild =

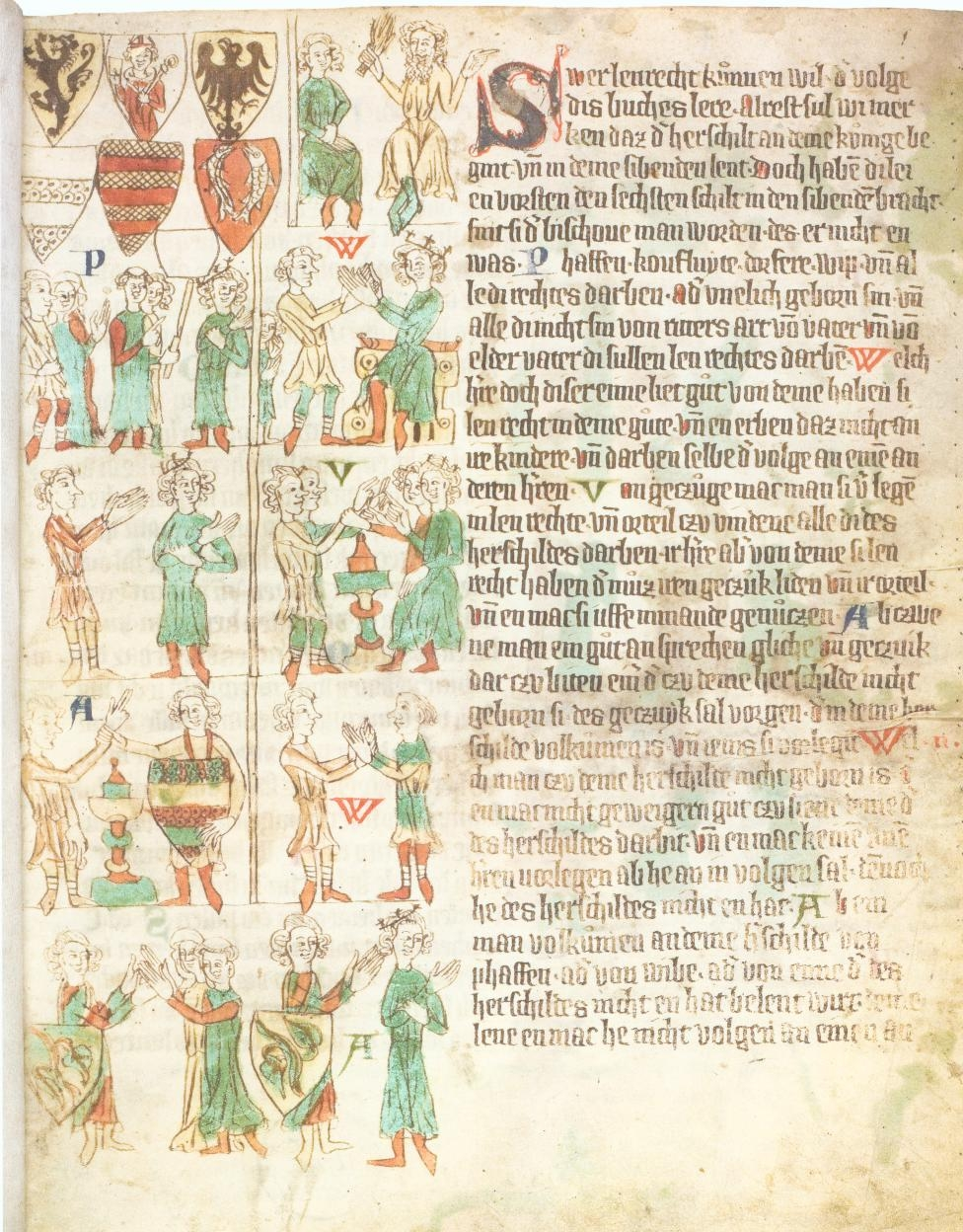
The Heerschildordnung of Eike von Repgow shows the estate structure of a medieval society, Heidelberg University Library, Cod. Pal. Germ. 164, fol. 1r

The Heerschild (German: [ˈheːɐ̯ˌʃɪlt]; Latin: clipeus militaris), also called the shield of knighthood, in the Early Middle Ages was the right to raise a feudal levy of troops. The call to do so was the Heerbann. The resulting importance of a system of military ranks, based on the ability to provide men for a campaign, became modified in the law books published in the 13th century. It finally ended up as being an important part of the structure of medieval society, as captured in the feudal law element of the Sachsenspiegel by Eike von Repgow.

The Sachsenspiegel, the Saxon law book, portrays the society of the medieval empire as divided into seven feudal military levels or Heerschilde (lit.: "army shields"). This Heerschildordnung was a scale determining a nobleman's status and was not based on military criteria. The first Heerschild was the king or emperor as the supreme overlord. This was followed by the second "shield", formed by the ecclesiastical princes - the bishops and abbots - of the empire. The third level comprised the secular or lay princes, who, in turn, sat above the "free lords" (freie Herren), i.e. nobles who were not princes, of the fourth stratum. The fifth and sixth Heerschilde were formed by freeman, whether eligible for jury service (schöffenbar) or not, in other words commoners who were able to act as magistrates (5th level) or not (6th level). As to the seventh level, the Sachsenspiegel remains vague, both in terms its composition, as well as whether it was in any real sense a Heerschild. Based on this division of society, the Sachsenspiegel then dealt with the feudal law rights and obligations of each Heerschild.

== Literature ==
- Steffen Patzold: Das Lehnswesen. C. H. Beck, Munich, 2012, pp. 107ff, ISBN 978-3-406-63235-8.
