= Banalités =

Feudal obligation to use designated facilities under lordly or public authority

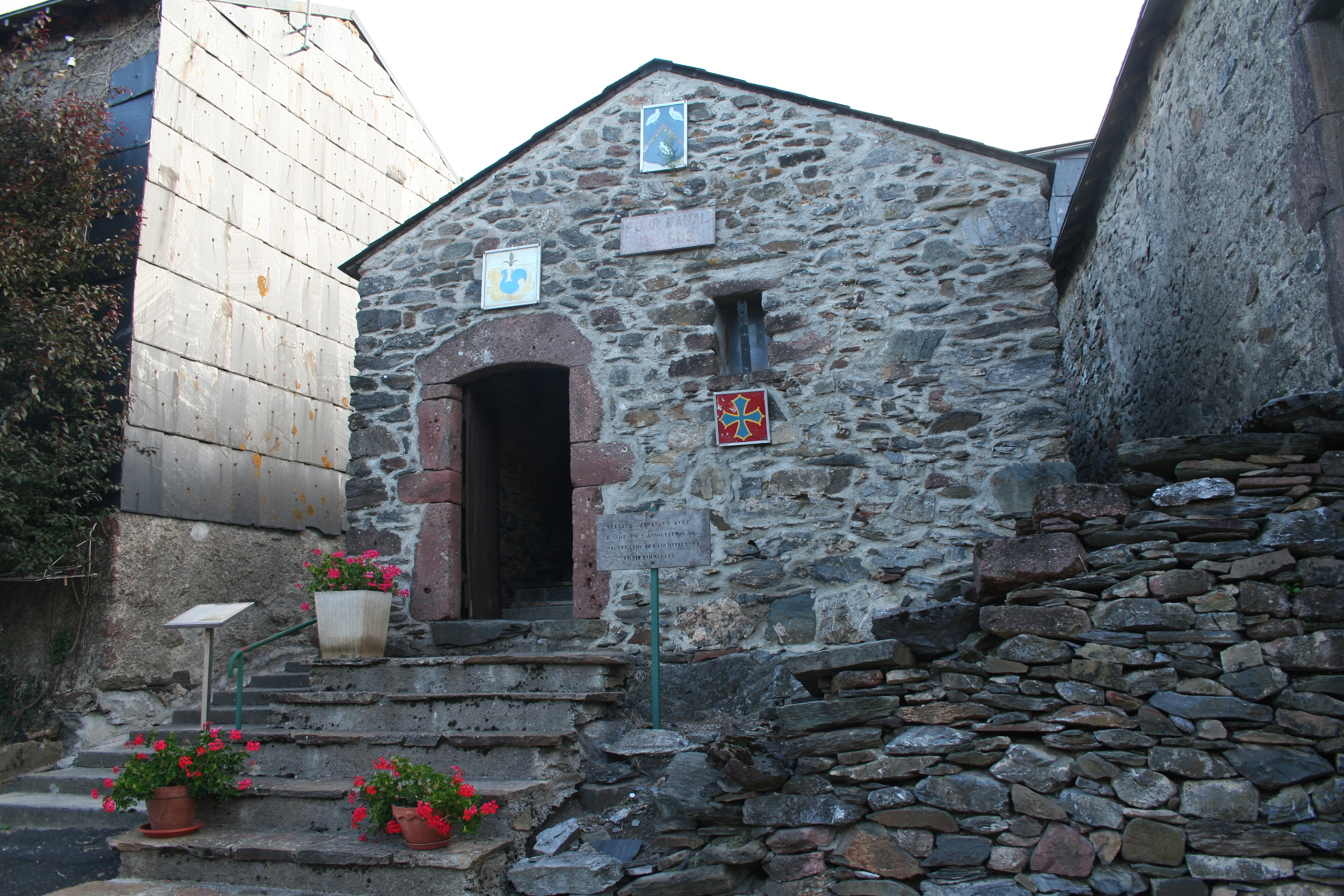
The four banal (communal oven) of Gos in Barre, Tarn, France

Banalités or banalities (French pronunciation: [banalite]; from ban) were, until the end of the Ancien Régime in various parts of Europe, rights linked to the exercise of lordship or public authority that imposed the compulsory use of designated facilities. The institution is most extensively documented in France, but comparable forms existed elsewhere in Europe under different legal traditions and terminology.

== France ==
Banalités in France were restrictions in feudal tenure by which peasants were obliged to use certain facilities owned or controlled by their manorial lord. These typically included the required, fee-based use of the lord’s mill to grind grain, his wine press to make wine, and his oven to bake bread. Both the lord’s right to impose such obligations and the dues paid by the users were known as the droit de banalité. The installations themselves were described as banal, for example the four banal or taureau banal.

The peasants could also be subjected to the banalité de tor et ver, meaning that only the lord had the right to own a bull or a boar. The deliberate mating of cattle or pigs without authorization incurred fines. The lord of the manor could further require a certain number of days of unpaid labor each year from the peasantry; this form of compulsory service was known as the corvée.

In New France, the only banality generally imposed was the mandatory use of the seigneurial mill.

These monopolistic rights were abolished during the night of 4 August 1789, although former feudal lords continued to receive compensation until 1793.

== Switzerland ==
In Switzerland, the term banalités referred, during the Middle Ages and under the Ancien Régime, to rights associated with the exercise of lordship, in particular economic monopolies. The corresponding German term, Ehaft, could denote both the monopolistic enterprises themselves and the buildings in which they were housed.

Originally, banalities often extended to common property (communal lands), as well as to certain objects subject to special rights and servitudes. Within medieval territorial lordship, they primarily concerned mills, inns, forges, bread ovens, and presses. Medium-sized localities and towns could additionally possess public baths, bakeries, butcheries, tanneries, and dye works subject to banality.

The lord was entitled to create banalities and to compel dependent populations to use their services by prohibiting competing installations through the exercise of ban and jurisdiction. Operation of these monopolies was generally entrusted to professional tenants rather than being carried out directly by the lord. Municipal councils exercised comparable powers within their jurisdictions.

From the 16th century onward, sovereign authorities, in the Swiss context the cantonal governments, increasingly claimed for themselves the exclusive right to establish or abolish banalities, often disregarding the claims of territorial lords. In many cases, these lords lost the lengthy legal proceedings they initiated to defend their rights.

In general, hydraulic grain mills, paper mills, powder mills, and enterprises requiring a right of fire, such as smelters, ironworks, and forges, were subject to banality. Ancillary installations—such as grinding, stamping, oil, or spice mills—as well as workshops of grinders, sawmills, tinplate workshops, fulling mills, and nail workshops usually required a concession. Such concessions protected their holders from competition without constituting full banalities.

In Swiss law, banality was a real right attached to a building and could subsist even after operations had ceased. Holders of banal installations benefited from monopoly protection and preferential access to means of production and raw materials, but they were also bound by obligations. These included the duty to serve all customers, ensure sufficient production of adequate quality, and respect fixed prices. Innkeepers were additionally required to accommodate and supervise travelers. Millers, innkeepers, and their households were commonly required to swear an oath, and authorities could dismiss operators who failed in their duties.

Where a demonstrable need arose, new banal services could be created. Operators of neighboring banalities frequently opposed such creations, particularly under the Ancien Régime, leading to conflicts and the emergence of clandestine establishments such as unauthorized taverns. As a result, authorities increasingly preferred to grant personal, often lifetime, licenses rather than establish new irrevocable real rights. Any modification of an installation required official authorization, and operators paid an entry fee and an annual rent.

After 1800, many Swiss enterprises subject to banality disappeared or were transformed into industrial or free enterprises. Others survived until the 19th century, as cantonal legislation on industry and crafts tolerated them despite their incompatibility with freedom of trade, either on the basis of acquired rights or in the interest of public order and morality, particularly in the case of inns. Banalities were definitively abolished with the generalization of freedom of trade and industry under the Federal Constitution of 1874. Authorizations and patents linked to certain establishments or professions were retained, but as personal rather than real rights.

== Other European regions ==
Similar obligations, especially concerning mills, existed elsewhere in Europe. In the Netherlands they were known as banrecht, while in Germany comparable institutions were referred to as Ehaft.

In England, feudal duty obliged many peasants to use bannal mills and ovens,Oxford English Dictionary and in Scotland thirlage tied land to a specific mill, whose owner took a proportion of the grain as multure.

== See also ==
- Ban (medieval)
- Manorialism
- Abolition of feudalism in France
