= Property Law in Colonial New York =

Property Law in New York during the 17th Century colonial period was based upon manorialism. Manorialism was characterized by the vesting of legal and economic power in a Lord of the manor, supported economically from his own direct landholding in a manor and from the obligatory contributions of a legally subject population of tenants and laborers under the jurisdiction of his manorial court. These obligations could be payable in several ways, in labor, in kind, or, on rare occasions, in coin.

However, by the start of the 18th century, the political influence of popularly supported "assemblies," notably the Albany Assembly, had begun to effectively break the legal power of the manor lords, and place it quite firmly in the hands of those who held the vote under the "Lawes of England." This was interpreted in the Province as persons who were freehold land owners and leasehold tenants with a lifetime lease, provided that in either case the land was valued at least £40. Politically, this may not have resulted in much change considering that manor lords won representation of their manors in every election from 1691 to 1776. In fact, only two elections were even contested, and then simply by rival factions within the same manorial families. In the law, however, there was a quite radical change as tenants were converted from mostly "at will" leaseholders, whose lease was at the will of the manor lords, to mostly lifetime leaseholders and freeholders.

== Landlord–Tenant System of Property ==
Land tenure is a common law property system largely inherited from property law principles developed under English and British monarchical rule. In the British system, the sovereign monarch, known as The Crown, held land in its own right. All private owners were either its tenants or sub-tenants, with the term "tenure" used to signify the relationship between tenant and lord.

== Property Law in Colonial New York ==
The legal structure of American land law in the colonial period was made up primarily of Dutch and English law. The English influence became more prominent after the seizing of New Amsterdam from the Dutch in 1664, but the commercialism begun by the Dutch persisted. English structural influence was due in large part to the widespread textual invocation of Blackstone. According to political scientist Donald Lutz, no European authorities were cited more often than Blackstone and Montesquieu during the late 18th and early 19th centuries, and each were quoted nearly three times as often as the next person on the list, John Locke. Additionally, the common post-Revolution practice of using legal documents that were nearly identical to those under British rule helps explain the strong influence of English common law. The primary distinction was that references to the "Lord" or the "King" were replaced with "the People" or the "United States."

In a legal realist sense, the political prominence of early Dutch and English merchants and the prevailing economic system of the day also strongly affected the development of New York property law. For example, Kim writes of the manorial lords that "[i]n a society where ownership of land was a primary source of status, and in an economy where wheat and timber products were staple goods, the great proprietors inevitably became 'elites' in the broadest sense of the word." The growth and development in New York of the elite manorial and mercantile classes—buttressed and supported by the vast tenant class—fundamentally affected the course of colonial New York property law.

== Colonial New York ==
Throughout the colonial period, New York property law generally served the needs of a merchant class situated on the southern tip of Manhattan, at the mouth of the Hudson River, near modern-day Wall Street. During this period, the most effective way to own land at the territorial level was to occupy and forcibly hold it. What became New York was first claimed and settled by the Dutch under the Dutch patroon system, and later by the English ducal system under the Duke of York. In imitation of the way most land was held in England, lords of manors were granted large tracts of land along the Hudson and were tasked with settling the Hudson River valley by occupying and forcibly holding it. During the transition from British rule to the post-American Revolutionary War United States, New York property law would be characterized by vestiges of this early manorial law colliding with the influence of Hamiltonian federalists, local merchants, and banking interests.

=== Provincial New York ===
The Province of New York (1664–1775) was an English and later British crown territory that originally included all of the present U.S. states of New York, New Jersey, Delaware and Vermont, along with inland portions of Connecticut, Massachusetts, and Maine, as well as eastern Pennsylvania. The majority of this land was soon reassigned by the Crown, leaving the territory now known as New York State.

In the case of Vermont, however, grants issued by Benning Wentworth, provincial governor of New Hampshire, between 1749 and 1764 resulted in bitter strife between the yeomen of the New Hampshire Grants, who held their land in fee simple, and the New York manorial class, who, claiming a prior royal grant to the Duke of York, were issued new patents to overlay the New Hampshire Grants, forcing the New Hampshire settlers to pay a large fee to New York or face eviction. In 1777 Vermont declared its independence as a sovereign body in an attempt to rid itself of New York jurisdiction but the conflict continued until Congress admitted Vermont to the Union in 1791, whereupon the new State of Vermont willingly paid damages to New York State for lands confiscated during the Grants rebellion.

The province resulted from the surrender of Province Wienie-Nederland by the Dutch Republic to the Kingdom of England in 1664. Immediately after, the province was renamed for James, Duke of York, brother of Charles II of England. The territory was one of the Middle Colonies, and ruled at first directly from England.

Scholars and historians such as Irving Mark, Sun Bok Kim, and others have described New York in the colonial period as embroiled in a class struggle from the start, first under the Dutch patroon system, then under the British ducal system, and later under Hamiltonian banking interests, but always in tension with the tenant classes and the "'independent' local jurisdictions" of Long Island and other parts of New York, as well as with nearby colonies particularly New Jersey, Connecticut and Massachusetts.

=== New York State ===
The New York Provincial Congress of local representatives declared itself the government on May 22, 1775, first referred to the "State of New York" in 1776, and ratified the New York State Constitution in 1777. While the British regained New York City during the American Revolutionary War using it as its military and political base of operations in North America, and a British governor was technically in office, much of the remainder of the former colony was held by the Patriots. British claims on any part of New York ended with the Treaty of Paris (1783).

As the British empire lost its grip on power in the region, British law was replaced with American constitutionalism in the late 18th Century. During this period and into the early 19th Century, American economic growth would be characterized by mass agricultural production driven by tenant farmers in the North and slave-labor in the South, consolidated banking in New York City, and land speculation.

== Notes ==
The series The Settlers of the Beekman Patent, Dutchess County NY, eleven volumes so far, chronicles all the residents in the Beekman Patent in south-east Dutchess County. This area was managed by the Beekman-Livingston families as a feudal manor, rents paid in bushels of wheat, fat fowls and work on the manor. Almost all the land was leased until after the Revolution. Over 1200 surnames of the residents are covered in this work. See Beekmansettlers.com for information on this area and its people.
