= Patriotic Society of 1789 =

Society of 1789 Club de 1789
- Founded: 1790; 236 years ago
- Dissolved: 1791; 235 years ago
- Succeeded by: Club des Feuillants
- Headquarters: Palais-Royal, Paris
- Ideology: Constitutional monarchy Classical liberalism Conservative liberalism Moderatism
- Political position: Centre
- Colors: Grey (customary); Blue White Red (cockade of France)

The Society of 1789 (French: Club de 1789), or the Patriotic Society of 1789 (French: Société patriotique de 1789), was a political club of the French Revolution inaugurated during a festive banquet held at Palais-Royal on May 13, 1790 by more moderate elements of the Club Breton. At their height of influence, it was the second most important club after the Jacobin Club.

Among its members were Jean Sylvain Bailly, Mayor of Paris; Gilbert du Motier, Marquis de Lafayette, commander-in-chief of the National Guard; François Alexandre Frédéric, duc de la Rochefoucauld-Liancourt, Isaac René Guy le Chapelier, Honoré Gabriel Riqueti, comte de Mirabeau, Emmanuel Joseph Sieyès, Charles Maurice de Talleyrand-Périgord and Nicolas de Condorcet.

The club kept an apartment in Palais-Royal where banquets were held. Its members were considered moderate and preferred for France to remain a constitutional monarchy in opposition to the republicans.

The popularity of the club eventually decreased the same year as it was founded and the remaining audience went to form the Club des Feuillants, founded 18 July 1791.

== See also ==
- Feuillant (political group)
