= Manorialism =

Economic, political, and judicial institution during the Middle Ages in Europe

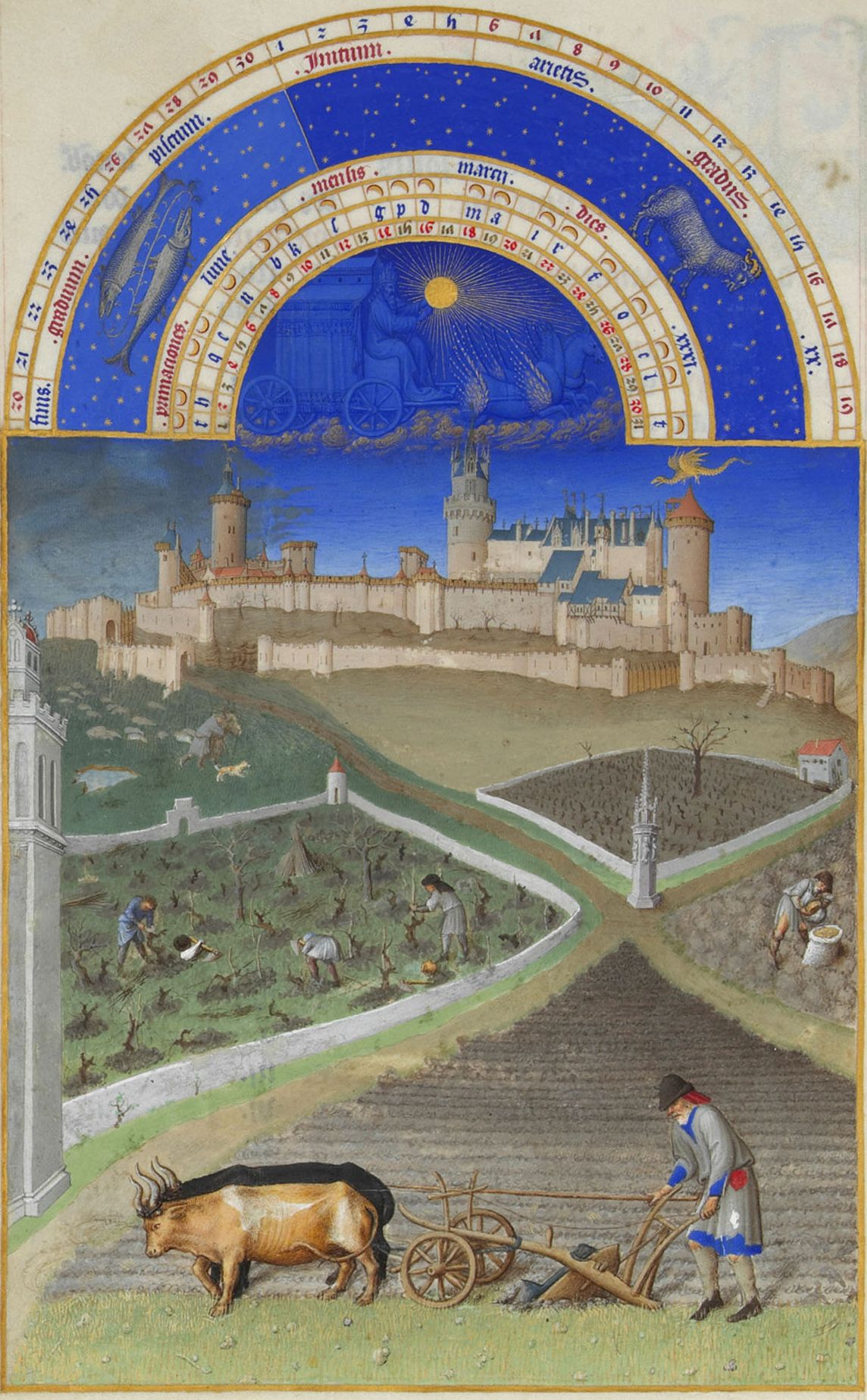
Ploughing on a French ducal manor in March from the manuscript, Les Très Riches Heures du Duc de Berry, c. 1410

Manorialism, also known as seigneurialism, the manor system or manorial system, was the method of land ownership (or "tenure") in parts of Europe, notably France and later England, during the Middle Ages. Its defining features included a large, sometimes fortified manor house or castle in which the lord of the manor and his dependents lived and administered a rural estate, and a population of labourers or serfs who worked the surrounding land to support themselves and the lord. These labourers fulfilled their obligations with labour time or in-kind produce at first, and later by cash payment as commercial activity increased. Manorialism was part of the feudal system.

Manorialism originated in the Roman villa system of the Late Roman Empire, and was widely practised in medieval western Europe and parts of central Europe. An essential element of feudal society, manorialism was slowly replaced by the advent of a money-based market economy and new forms of agrarian contract.

Manorialism faded away slowly and piecemeal, along with its most vivid feature in the landscape, the open field system. It outlasted serfdom in the sense that it continued with freehold labourers. As an economic system, it outlasted feudalism, according to Andrew Jones, because "it could maintain a warrior, but it could equally well maintain a capitalist landlord. It could be self-sufficient, yield produce for the market, or it could yield a money rent." The last feudal dues in France were abolished at the French Revolution. In parts of eastern Germany, the Rittergut manors of Junkers remained until World War II.

== Historical and geographical distribution ==
The term is most often used with reference to medieval Western Europe. Antecedents of the system can be traced to the rural economy of the later Roman Empire (Dominate). Labour was the key factor of production. Successive administrations tried to stabilise the imperial economy by freezing the social structure into place: sons were to succeed their fathers in their trading, councillors were forbidden to resign, and coloni, the cultivators of land, were not to move from the land they were attached to. The workers of the land were on their way to becoming serfs.

Several factors conspired to merge the status of former slaves and former free farmers into a dependent class of such coloni: it was possible to be described as servus et colonus, "both slave and colonus". The Laws of Constantine I around 325 both reinforced the semi-servile status of the coloni and limited their rights to sue in the courts; the Codex Theodosianus promulgated under Theodosius II extended these restrictions. The legal status of adscripti, "bound to the soil", contrasted with barbarian foederati, who were permitted to settle within the imperial boundaries, remaining subject to their own traditional law.

As the Germanic kingdoms succeeded Roman authority in the west in the fifth century, Roman landlords were often simply replaced by Germanic ones, with little change to the underlying situation or displacement of populations.

The process of rural self-sufficiency was given an abrupt boost in the eighth century, when normal trade in the Mediterranean Sea was disrupted.

== Description ==
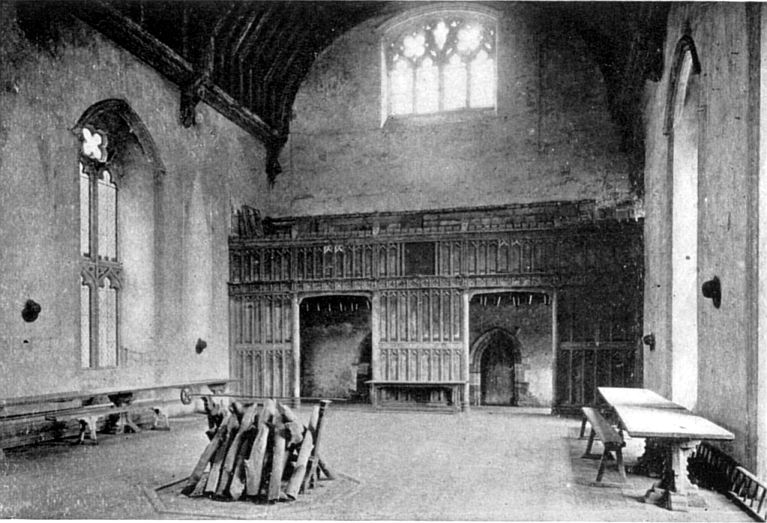
The great hall at Penshurst Place, Kent, built in the mid 14th century. A manor house hall was where the lord and his family ate, received guests, and conferred with dependents.

The word derives from traditional inherited divisions of the countryside, reassigned as local jurisdictions known as manors or seigneuries; each manor being subject to a lord (French seigneur), usually holding his position in return for undertakings offered to a higher lord (see Feudalism). The lord held a manorial court, governed by public law and local custom. Not all territorial seigneurs were secular; bishops and abbots also held lands that entailed similar obligations.

By extension, the word manor is sometimes used in England as a slang term for any home area or territory in which authority is held, often in a police or criminal context.

In the generic plan of a medieval manor from Shepherd's Historical Atlas, the strips of individually worked land in the open field system are immediately apparent. In this plan, the manor house is set slightly apart from the village, but equally often the village grew up around the forecourt of the manor, formerly walled, while the manor lands stretched away outside, as still may be seen at Petworth House. As concerns for privacy increased in the 18th century, manor houses were often located a farther distance from the village. For example, when a grand new house was required by the new owner of Harlaxton Manor, Lincolnshire, in the 1830s, the site of the existing manor house at the edge of its village was abandoned for a new one, isolated in its park, with the village out of view.

In an agrarian society, the conditions of land tenure underlie all social or economic factors. There were two legal systems of pre-manorial landholding. One, the most common, was the system of holding land "allodially" in full outright ownership. The other was a use of precaria or benefices, in which land was held conditionally (the root of the English word "precarious").

To these two systems, the Carolingian monarchs added a third, the aprisio, which linked manorialism with feudalism. The aprisio made its first appearance in Charlemagne's province of Septimania in the south of France, when Charlemagne had to settle the Visigothic refugees who had fled with his retreating forces after the failure of his Zaragoza expedition of 778. He solved this problem by allotting "desert" tracts of uncultivated land belonging to the royal fisc under direct control of the emperor. These holdings aprisio entailed specific conditions. The earliest specific aprisio grant that has been identified was at Fontjoncouse, near Narbonne (see Lewis, links). In former Roman settlements, a system of villas, dating from Late Antiquity, was inherited by the medieval world.

=== The seigneur ===
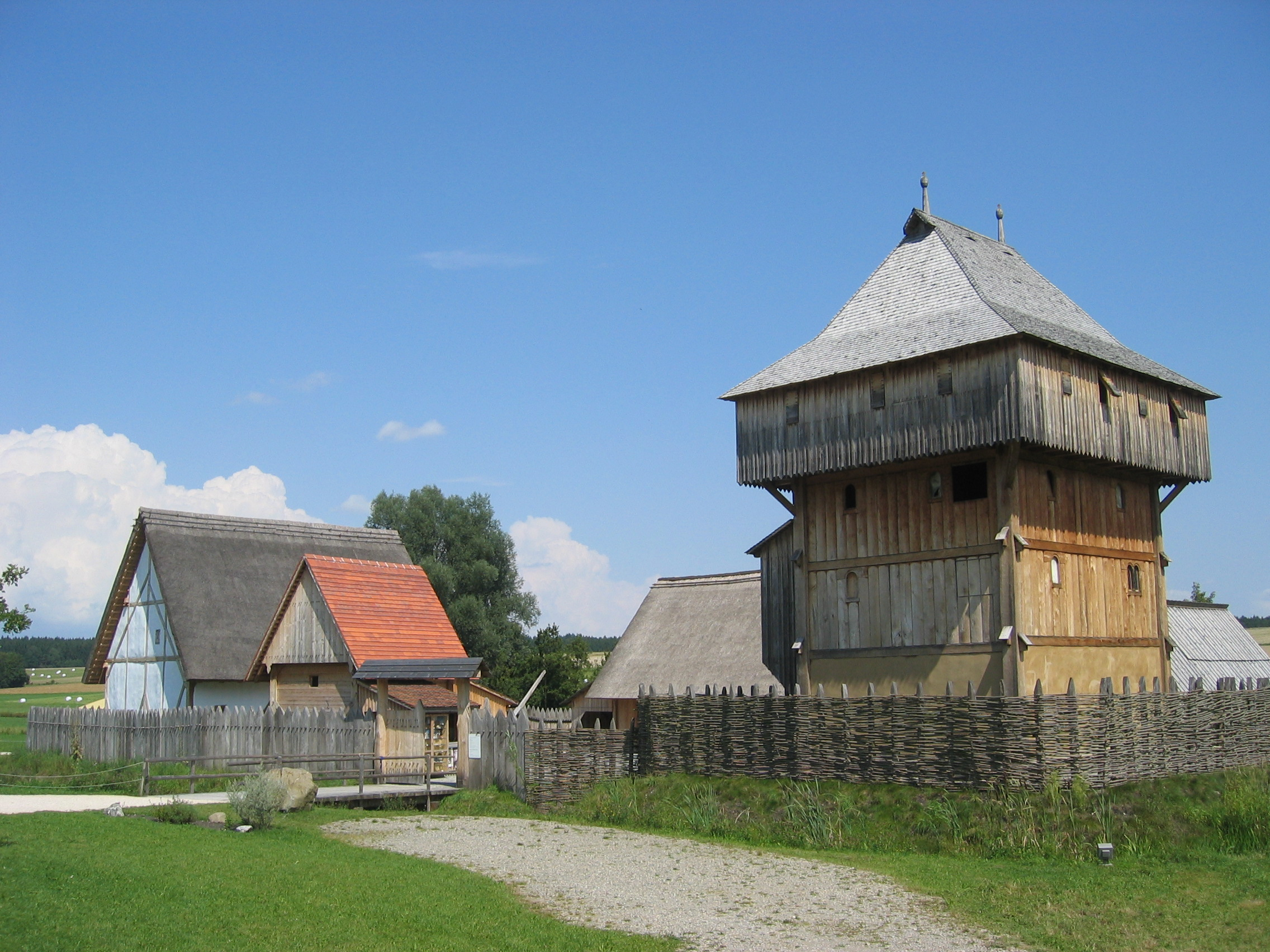
Reconstruction of a medieval castle, Bachritterburg, Baden-Württemberg

The possessor of a seigneurie bears the title of "Lord". He can be an individual, in the vast majority of cases a national of the nobility or of the Bourgeoisie, but also a judicial person most often an ecclesiastical institution such as an abbey, a cathedral or canonical chapter or a military order. The power of the lord was exercised through various intermediaries, the most important of which was the bailiff. The sovereign can also be a lord; the seigneuries he owns form the royal domain.

The title of lord is also granted, especially in modern times, to individuals holding noble fiefdoms which are not official seigneuries. These "lords" are sometimes called sieurs, equivalent terms in medieval times.

=== The land lordship ===
The lord is the direct or prominent owner of the land assets of his lordship. The notion of absolute ownership over a common good cannot be applied, because there are also others than the main user who have rights over these goods. For example, in England, all allodial ownership of the land was by the monarch; some of that land was granted to and held by feudal barons with direct fealty or homage to the monarch. Feudal barons were usually direct tenants-in-chief who then granted land tenure to multiple vassals to work the land. Sometimes tenants in chief could be directly beholden to the monarch.

Details and names varied, depending on the period and area of Europe, i.e. England versus Prussia or France. Monarchs (or feudal barons with vassals) set the reserves which were split between the set of goods of which the land lord reserved the direct exploitation and tenant-in-chief, property whose exploitation is entrusted to a vassal against payment of a royalty, most often called cens and services such as Corvée. The distribution between reserve and tenure varied depending on the period and region.

== Common features ==
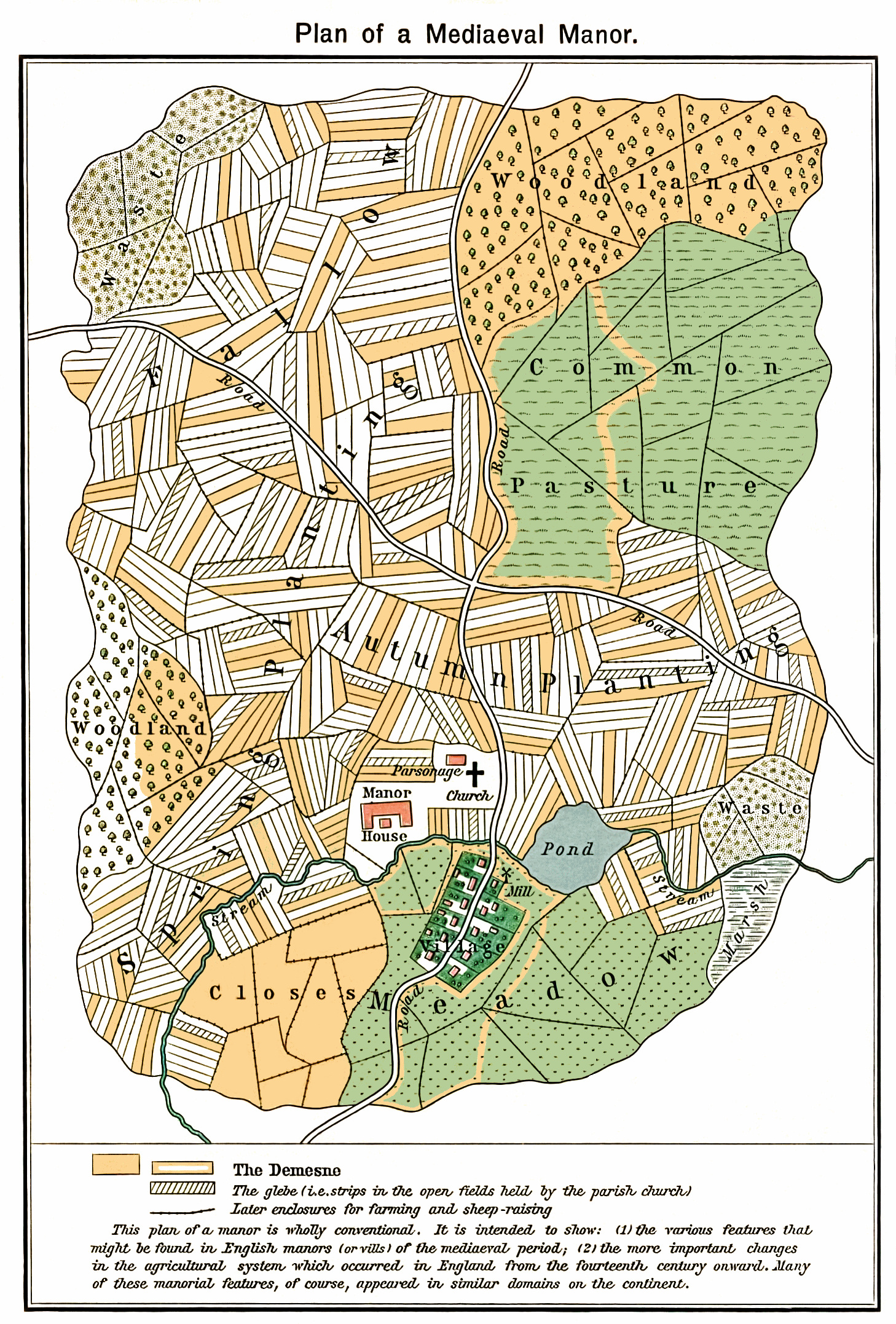
Generic map of a medieval manor. The mustard-coloured areas are part of the demesne, the hatched areas part of the glebe. William R. Shepherd, Historical Atlas, 1923.

Manors each consisted of up to three classes of land:

1. Demesne, the part directly controlled by the lord and used for the benefit of his household and dependents;
2. Dependent (serf or villein) holdings carrying the obligation that the peasant household supply the lord with specified labour services or a part of its output (or cash in lieu thereof), subject to the custom attached to the holding; and
3. Free peasant land, without such obligation but otherwise subject to manorial jurisdiction and custom, and owing money rent fixed at the time of the lease.

Additional sources of income for the lord included charges for use of his mill, bakery or wine-press, or for the right to hunt or to let pigs feed in his woodland, as well as court revenues and single payments on each change of tenant. On the other side of the account, manorial administration involved significant expenses, perhaps a reason why smaller manors tended to rely less on villein tenure.

Dependent holdings were held nominally by arrangement of lord and tenant, but tenure became in practice almost universally hereditary, with a payment made to the lord on each succession of another member of the family. Villein land could not be abandoned, at least until demographic and economic circumstances made flight a viable proposition; nor could they be passed to a third party without the lord's permission, and the customary payment.

Although not free, villeins were by no means in the same position as slaves: they enjoyed legal rights, subject to local custom, and had recourse to the law subject to court charges, which were an additional source of manorial income. Sub-letting of villein holdings was common, and labour on the demesne might be commuted into an additional money payment, as happened increasingly from the 13th century.

Land which was neither let to tenants nor formed part of demesne lands was known as "manorial waste"; typically, this included hedges, verges, etc. Common land where all members of the community had right of passage was known as "lord's waste". Part of the demesne land of the manor which being uncultivated was termed the Lord's Waste and served for public roads and for common pasture to the lord and his tenants. In many settlements during the early modern period, illegal building was carried out on lord's waste land by squatters who would then plead their case to remain with local support. An example of a lord's waste settlement, where the main centres grew up in this way, is the village of Bredfield in Suffolk. Lord's waste continues to be a source of rights and responsibilities issues in places such as Henley-in-Arden, Warwickshire.

In examining the origins of the monastic cloister, Walter Horn found that "as a manorial entity the Carolingian monastery ... differed little from the fabric of a feudal estate, save that the corporate community of men for whose sustenance this organisation was maintained consisted of monks who served God in chant and spent much of their time in reading and writing."

=== Residents of a manor ===
- Lord of the manor (who could be an absentee)
- Serfs
- Villeins
- Cottars
- Bordars
- Freeholders
- Copyholders

=== Tenants ===
Tenants owned land on the manor under one of several legal agreements: freehold, copyhold, customary freehold and leasehold.

== Variation among manors ==
Like feudalism which, together with manorialism, formed the legal and organisational framework of feudal society, manorial structures were not uniform or coordinated. In the later Middle Ages, areas of incomplete or non-existent manorialisation persisted while the manorial economy underwent substantial development with changing economic conditions.

Not all manors contained all three classes of land. Typically, demesne accounted for roughly a third of the arable area, and villein holdings rather more; but some manors consisted solely of demesne, others solely of peasant holdings. The proportion of unfree and free tenures could likewise vary greatly, with more or less reliance on wage labour for agricultural work on the demesne.

The proportion of the cultivated area in demesne tended to be greater in smaller manors, while the share of villein land was greater in large manors, providing the lord of the latter with a larger supply of obligatory labour for demesne work. The proportion of free tenements was generally less variable, but tended to be somewhat greater on the smaller manors.

Manors varied similarly in their geographical arrangement: most did not coincide with a single village, but rather consisted of parts of two or more villages, most of the latter containing also parts of at least one other manor. This situation sometimes led to replacement by cash payments or their equivalents in kind of the demesne labour obligations of those peasants living furthest from the lord's estate.

As with peasant plots, the demesne was not a single territorial unit, but consisted rather of a central house with neighbouring land and estate buildings, plus strips dispersed through the manor alongside free and villein ones: in addition, the lord might lease free tenements belonging to neighbouring manors, as well as holding other manors some distance away to provide a greater range of produce.

Nor were manors held necessarily by lay lords rendering military service (or again, cash in lieu) to their superior: a substantial share (estimated by value at 17% in England in 1086) belonged directly to the king, and a greater proportion (rather more than a quarter) were held by bishoprics and monasteries. Ecclesiastical manors tended to be larger, with a significantly greater villein area than neighbouring lay manors.

The effect of circumstances on manorial economy is complex and at times contradictory: upland conditions tended to preserve peasant freedoms (livestock husbandry in particular being less labour-intensive and therefore less demanding of villein services); on the other hand, some upland areas of Europe showed some of the most oppressive manorial conditions, while lowland eastern England is credited with an exceptionally large free peasantry, in part a legacy of Scandinavian settlement.

Similarly, the spread of money economy stimulated the replacement of labour services by money payments, but the growth of the money supply and resulting inflation after 1170 initially led nobles to take back leased estates and to re-impose labour dues as the value of fixed cash payments declined in real terms.

== Abolition ==
The last feudal dues in France were abolished at the French Revolution. The last patroonship was abolished in New York in the 1840s as a result of the Anti-Rent War. In parts of eastern Germany, the Rittergut manors of Junkers remained until World War II. In Quebec, the last feudal rents were paid in 1970 under the modified provisions of the Seigniorial Dues Abolition Act of 1935.

== See also ==
=== General ===
- Allodial title
- Domesday Book
- Glebe
- Banal rights
- Gentry
- Château de Cessens-Vieux

=== Similar land tenure systems in other parts of the world ===
- Maenor, the Welsh system
- Heerlijkheid, Dutch manorialism
- Junker, Prussian manorialism
- Folwark, system in Poland/Lithuania
- Baltic nobility, system in Estonia/Latvia
- Latifundium, Ancient Rome
- Patroon, 17th century New Netherland
- Property Law in Colonial New York, 17th–18th century New York
- Seigneurial system of New France, 17th century Canada
- Hacienda, the Spanish system
- Fazenda, the Portuguese system in colonial Brazil
- Mouza, manor equivalent in the Indian Subcontinent
- Indian feudalism, Indian feudalism
- Fengjian, Chinese feudalism
- Shōen the Japanese system
- Particuliere landerij, 17th-century Dutch East Indies (now Indonesia)
