= Ban (medieval) =

Medieval power of authority

In the Middle Ages, the ban (Latin: bannus, bannum; German: Bann) or banality (French: banalité) was originally the power to command men in war and evolved into the general authority to order and to punish. As such, it was the basis for the raising of armies and the exercise of justice. The word is of Germanic origin and first appears in fifth-century law codes. Under the Franks it was a royal prerogative, but could be delegated and, from the tenth century, was frequently usurped by lesser nobles.

The adjective "banal" or "bannal" describes things pertaining to the ban. Its modern sense of "commonplace" (even "trite") derives from the fact that tenants were frequently required to use common mills, presses, ovens, etc. for the benefit of their lord exercising his banal rights.

== Merovingian and Carolingian eras ==
Under the Merovingian dynasty (481–751), the ban was used mainly by the kings to summon free men to military service.

In the late eighth and early ninth century, under the Carolingian dynasty (751–987), a series of capitularies defined the ban's three components: the right to defend the defenceless, that is, churches, widows and orphans; jurisdiction over violent crimes such as murder, rape and arson; and the right to summon free men for military service. In the ninth century, the exercise of banal power was often delegated to the counts (Latin comites), who were royal appointees and exercised the power in public courts called placita. The ban was also often delegated to prelates whose ecclesiastical jurisdictions had been granted royal immunity. One of the duties of a count was to summon the people to swear an oath to the king.

The counts combined their banal authority with the management of the royal fisc and the collection of taxes and were thus the king's representatives in every aspect of his public authority. Under the Carolingians, the ban itself still retained a primarily military significance. Since the counts had charge of the public fortresses in their counties, their ability to recruit and command men was critical to garrisoning these fortresses and defending the kingdom.

== Banal lordship ==
The historian Georges Duby first used the phrase "banal lordship" (French seigneurie banale) to describe the development of a form of lordship based not merely on the ownership of land but on the bannum. This had its origins in West Francia (France) in the late tenth century.

First, the commanders of the public fortresses—castellans—were delegated or else usurped the authority of the counts. Powerful landlords likewise usurped public authority, sometimes even usurping the ban over monasteries that had received ecclesiastical immunities. The ban thus came to refer to both the authority and the district (smaller than a county) over which it was exercised. The authority to summon men for military service extended to labour service in the upkeep of roads, bridges and castles. This in turn justified levying of tolls on the use of roads, bridges and fords. Eventually, labour service, called corvée, was demanded on the castellan or lord's own land, his demesne. The use of common land, such as ponds, forests and pastures, was regulated by the lord and could likewise be described as banal. There were in the end few limits to what a lord could justify as a banality. The primary meaning of the ban remained for a long time, however, the ability to summon to court and to dispense justice.

As a result of the "privatising" of the ban, the word itself acquired a new expanded meaning by the early eleventh century. It was an "unrestricted territorial authority" and "the whole of the powers enjoyed by the castellan lord over the men of his district[,] a general power of constraint, whose forms varied according to times and regions." The word bannum was gradually displaced in its original meaning of the right to command by the Latin terms districtus and potestas in northern France and mandamentum in southern France by the twelfth century. This left the term bannum only its newly acquired sense of economic monopoly power.

There came to be three common powers the lord exercised per bannum: the power to compel subjects to use the lord's mill for their grain, the lord's oven for their bread and the lord's winepress for their grapes. A fourth power, called the banvin, the right to compel subjects to buy the lord's wine during prescribed periods, was described as ad bannum. These "banalities" were not uniform throughout France. Banal mills, for example, were more common in the north and ovens more common in the south.

Payment for the use of the banal mill, oven and press was usually in kind and proportional to use, e.g. every sixth loaf to the lord or one twentieth of the wine processed. This made the ban an important source of revenue, since it was tied to productivity and commodity prices, both of which rose throughout the thirteenth century while tenurial rents were fixed by custom and thus remained low. Banal revenues could be granted in whole or in part as knight's fees, and thus supported the professionalisation of military service.

== Terminology ==
The following are Latin terms derived from bannum and in use in the Middle Ages.

- bannagium, banagium—a due from a banality (14th century)
- bannalia—commodities subject to a banality (12th century)
- bannarius, bannerius—a sergeant at arms (11th century), person owing a banality (13th century) or officer in charge of a banality (14th century)
- bannileuga—zone within a radius of one mile (lieue) around a castle and subject to its holder's authority (11th century) or a fine levied for an offence committed with this zone (11th century)
- bannitus—banal authority (13th century)
- banniva—district in which a banality is in force (12th century)

== See also ==
- arrière-ban, the general levy in France
- banalités, seignorial impositions on peasant tenants in France
- Heerbann, the general levy in Germany
- Königsbann, the ban of the Holy Roman Emperor
