= Jean Sylvain Bailly =

French astronomer, mathematician, freemason, and political leader (1736–1793)

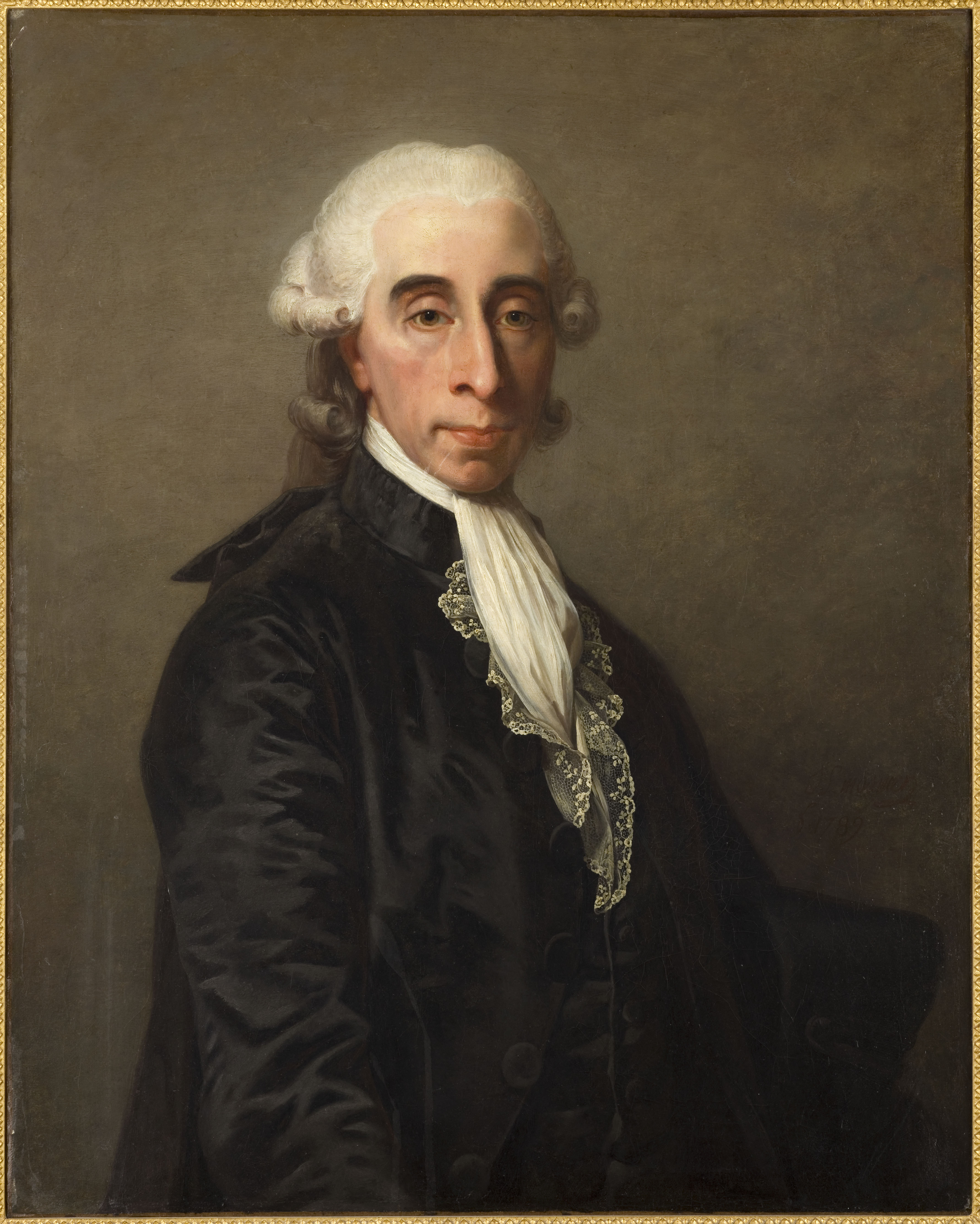
- Portrait by Jean-Laurent Mosnier, 1789

1st Mayor of Paris
- In office 15 July 1789 – 12 November 1791
- Preceded by: Jacques de Flesselles (Provost of the Merchants)
- Succeeded by: Jérôme Pétion de Villeneuve

1st President of the National Constituent Assembly
- In office 17 June 1789 – 3 July 1789
- Preceded by: Office established
- Succeeded by: Jean Georges Lefranc de Pompignan

Deputy of the Estates-General
- In office 5 May 1789 – 9 July 1789
- Constituency: Paris

Personal details
- Born: 15 September 1736 Paris, France
- Died: 12 November 1793 (aged 57) Paris, France
- Cause of death: Guillotined
- Party: Patriotic (1790–1791)
- Education: Academy of Sciences; French Academy
- Occupation: Astronomer; mathematician; politician

Jean Sylvain Bailly (French: [ʒɑ̃ silvɛ̃ baji]; 15 September 1736 – 12 November 1793) was a French astronomer, mathematician, freemason, and political leader of the early part of the French Revolution. He presided over the Tennis Court Oath, served as the mayor of Paris from 1789 to 1791, and was ultimately guillotined during the Reign of Terror.

== Scientific career ==
Born in Paris, Bailly was the son of Jacques Bailly, an artist and supervisor of the Louvre Palace, and the grandson of Nicolas Bailly, also an artist and court painter. As a child he originally intended to follow in his family's footsteps and pursue a career in the arts. He became deeply attracted to science, however, particularly astronomy, by the influence of Nicolas de Lacaille. An excellent student with a "particularly retentive memory and inexhaustible patience", he calculated an orbit for the next appearance of Halley's Comet (in 1759), and correctly reduced Lacaille's observations of 515 stars. He participated in the construction of an observatory at the Louvre. These achievements along with others got him elected to the French Academy of Sciences in 1763. In the years prior to the French Revolution, Bailly's distinctive reputation as a French astronomer led to his recognition and admiration by the European scientific community. Due to his popularity amongst the scientific groups, in 1777, Bailly received Benjamin Franklin as a guest in his house in Chaillot.

=== Scientific and other writing ===
Bailly published his Essay on The Theory of the Satellites of Jupiter in 1766.^{a} The essay was an expansion of a presentation he had made to the academy in 1763. He later released the noteworthy dissertation On the Inequalities of Light of the Satellites of Jupiter^{b} in 1771. In 1778, he was elected a foreign member of the Royal Swedish Academy of Sciences.

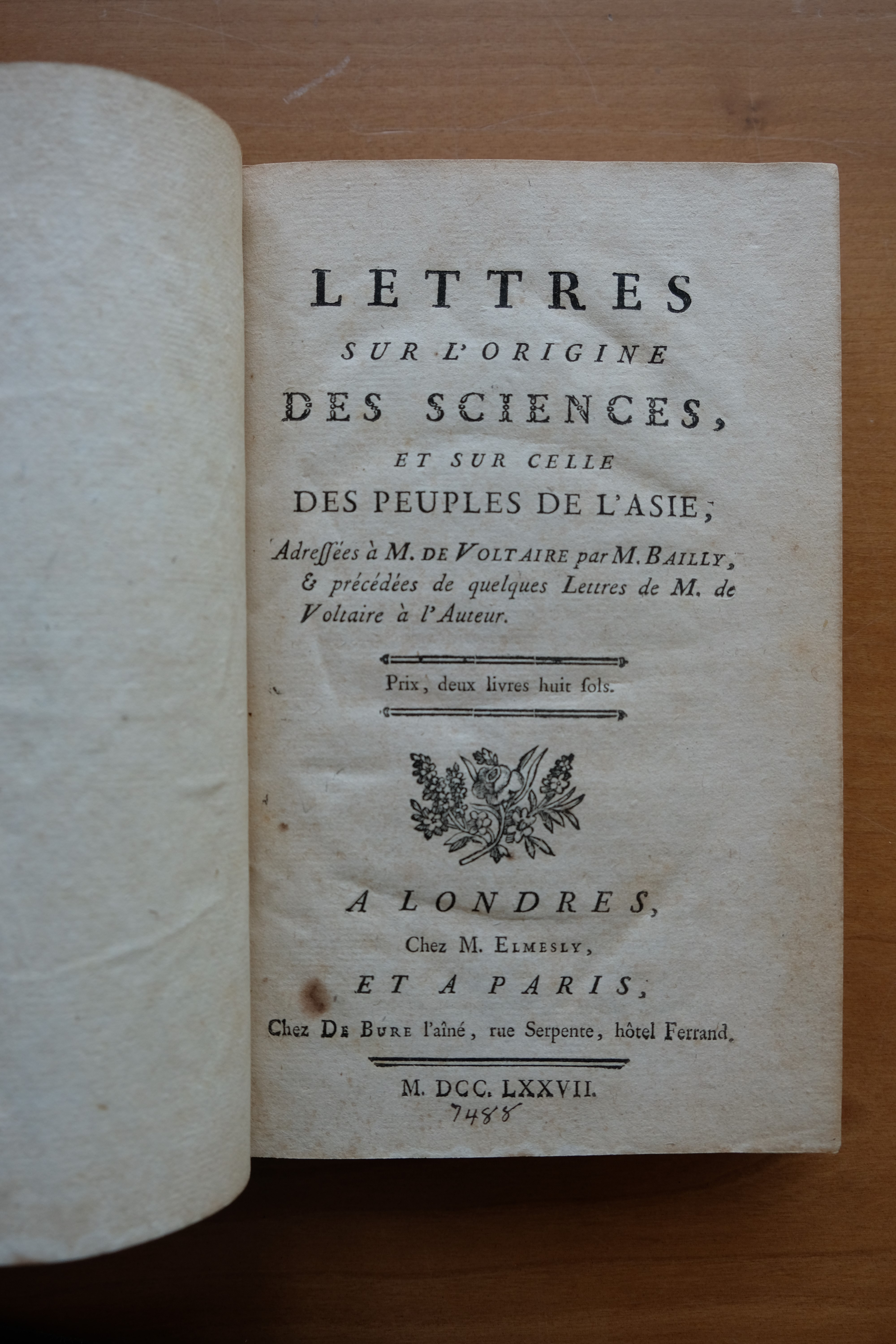
Front page of the 1777 copy of "Discourse on the Origin of the Sciences and the Peoples of Asia"

Bailly gained a high literary reputation thanks to his Eulogies for King Charles V of France, Lacaille, Molière, Pierre Corneille and Gottfried Leibniz, which were issued in collected form in 1770 and 1790. He was admitted to the Académie française on 26 February 1784 and to the Académie des Inscriptions in 1785. From then on, Bailly devoted himself to the history of science. He published A History of Ancient Astronomy ^{c} in 1775, followed by A History of Modern Astronomy (3 vols., 1782).^{d} Other works include Discourse on the Origin of the Sciences and the Peoples of Asia (1777),^{e} Discourse on Plato's 'Atlantide' (1779),^{f} and A Treatise on Indian and Oriental Astronomy (1787).^{g} Though his works were "universally admired" by contemporaries, later commentators have remarked that "their erudition was... marred by speculative extravagances."

== During the French Revolution ==
In a short period of time, Bailly made his way up the judicial ranks. From being the deputy of Paris, he was elected Estates-General on 20 May 1789. Soon after he was elected inaugural president of the National Assembly (3 June 1789) and led the famous proceedings in the Tennis Court on 20 June, being the first to take the Tennis Court Oath. In the National Assembly (French Revolution) Bailly was one of the deputies who secured the passage of a decree that declared Jews to be French citizens on 17 September 1791. He was met with threats and ridicule for this action. This decree repealed the special taxes that had been imposed on the Jews, as well as all the ordinances existing against them.

Bailly was a member of the Club de 1789, one of the best-known societies at the time. Though calls on his time from his mayoral duties restricted his involvement in the group, by May 1790, Bailly had risen to presiding officer of the club. In 1791, Jean Sylvain Bailly joined the Jacobin Club, but took no active role in it.

Shortly after the storming of the Bastille on 14 July 1789, he became the first mayor of Paris under the newly adopted system of the Commune.

Sketch by Jacques-Louis David of the Tennis Court Oath. Bailly is pictured in the centre, facing the viewer, his right hand raised.

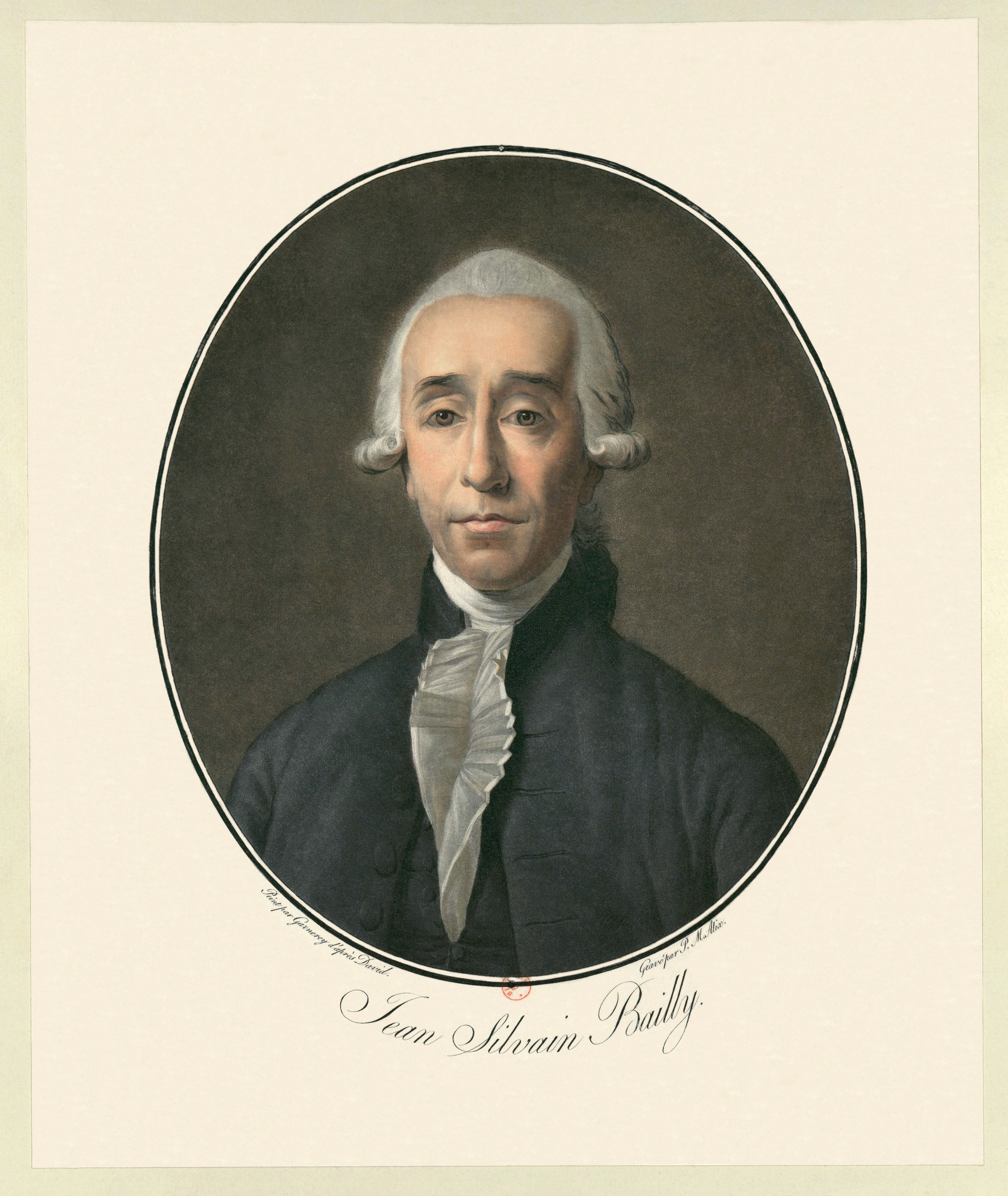
J.S.Bailly, by Garneray and Alix, after David scene above

== Mayor of Paris ==
On 15 July 1789, Bailly took office as the mayor of Paris. Two days later he was met by Louis XVI at the Hôtel de Ville who was there to endorse the Revolution. Bailly presented him with the new symbol of the revolution: the cockade of France.

In his function as mayor, he was attacked by Camille Desmoulins and Jean-Paul Marat as too conservative. Bailly continuously sought to promote the authority of the mayor while limiting the power of the General Assembly of the Commune.

=== Maintaining order ===
Jean Sylvain Bailly sought to be in full control of his administration as the mayor of Paris. He envisioned being in a position where all answered to him, and only his orders were to be followed. Creating a centralized government within Paris was his plan, however Parisians were not keen with this vision. His views are depicted in the following passage of his Mémoires:

... in the executive assembly, the mayor who presides over it is a specific officer of the commune. This Assembly possesses the totality of power, but its chief is its agent, its executive authority, who should be charged with the execution of its orders and the maintenance of its regulations. Moreover, since he is at the head of the administration, he understands all of its branches and has all of its strings in his hands. He is in a better position to detect the difficulties and the dangers than the other members who do not have the same information. If the law does not demand it, reason dictates that no important step be taken and no important questions be decided in his absence, unless he be allowed at least to make observations...

=== Food crisis ===
During the early years of the French Revolution, Paris was going through a major food shortage. Bailly's actions to circumvent the situation were of great importance in keeping the revolution alive. Bailly had deputies gather grain that was being hoarded, made the sale of wheat mandatory by farmers, and helped the bakers by making them first in line in the village markets. Convoys that transported grain obtained by deputies were often attacked. To deter these attacks, Bailly signed a decree imposing a fine of five hundred livres on anyone found obstructing such convoys. Not only did the mayor control the supply of grain in the city, but he also imported grain from Africa to increase the city's reserve. A provisional regime was established in October, 1789, in order to stabilize the administration of the government. Doing so led to order being established within the different jurisdictions, allowing The Communal Assembly, with the help of Bailly, to gain control of the food crisis. By February, 1790, the situation in Paris had improved.

=== National Guard ===
The National Guard, formed during the revolution by The Communal Assembly, was weak and underfunded. Lafayette, chief of the militia, could only do so much to strengthen this newly formed military. It took persuading to get funding from the Assembly to cover the cost and wages brought on by the troops. Bailly saw the importance of having a military that was well-equipped. In the fall of 1789, Bailly was able to acquire ammunition for the troops. In October 1789, Bailly was involved in the establishment of the National Guard department, whose purpose was to arm the military. The mayor not only played a role in strengthening the National Guard, but also issued orders to Lafayette when trying to maintain civility within the city. Bailly's use of troops was to secure the prisons, certify the droits d'entrée would be collected, and to ensure that beggars would not congregate in the city.

=== Church property ===
In an unsuccessful attempt at financial reconstruction, the National Assembly had taken control of church property, making it available to buyers through the issue of non-negotiable bonds known as "assignats". Bailly, along with the Municipal Bureau, then came up with a proposition on 10 March 1790, asking the government to give the city of Paris 200,000,000 livres worth of church land for it to sell to private investors in a period of three years. For their work in selling the land, Bailly and his administration would retain 50,000,000 livres. The National Assembly agreed to this deal. On 2 August 1790, Bailly was reelected as mayor. He allowed investors to begin the purchasing of church property. Before a year had passed, 28,000,000 livres worth of land had already been sold. Bailly's proposal proved successful in generating revenue for Paris and the French state.

=== Fall from favour ===
After a failed attempt by the royal family to flee the country, Bailly tried to contain the growing republican crowds asking for the King to step down. On the morning of 17 July 1791, tensions were rising as suspicion of treason grew. Citizens suspected of criticising the government or National Guard were being interrogated and detained. Bailly soon heard of a gathering at the Champ de Mars, where citizens were meeting to sign petitions calling for the overthrow of the King. Imposing martial law, he ordered the National Guard to disperse the large riotous assembly that had gathered. A violent response ensued and many people died, for which Bailly, along with Lafayette, was considered responsible. What was to become known as the Champ de Mars Massacre was taken by the revolutionaries as an exemplar for oppression by the government. Having thereby become extremely unpopular, Bailly resigned on 12 November and was replaced four days later by Jerôme Pétion. Bailly moved to Nantes, where he composed his Mémoires d'un Témoin (published in 3 volumes by MM. Berville and Barrière, 1821–1822), an incomplete narrative of the extraordinary events of his public life.

== Execution ==
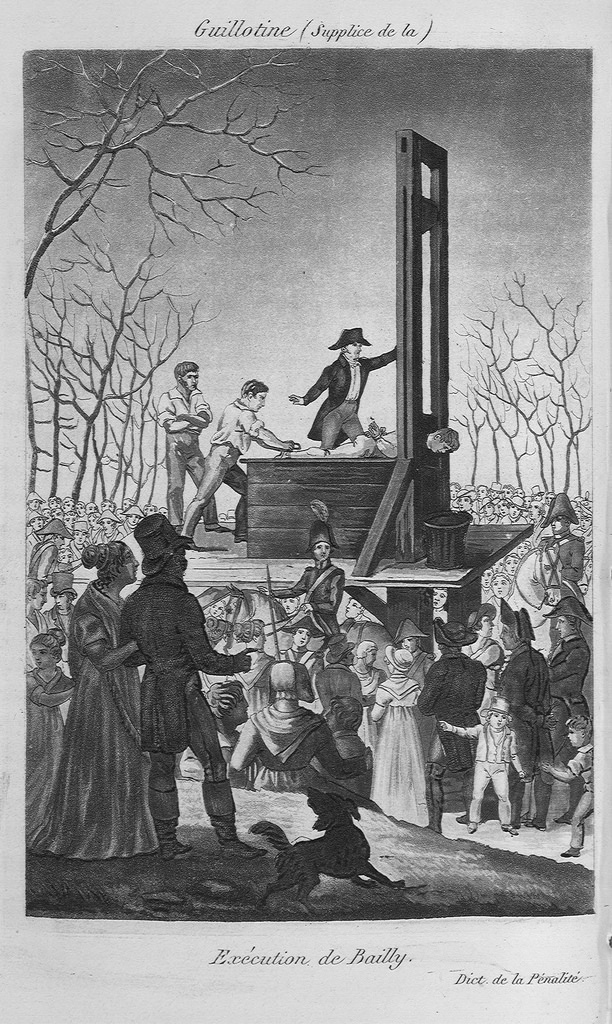
Bailly on the guillotine

In July 1793, Bailly left Nantes to join his friend Pierre-Simon Laplace at Melun, but was recognized there and arrested. On 14 October, he was pressed to testify against Marie Antoinette but refused. On 10 November 1793, he was brought before the Revolutionary Tribunal in Paris, speedily tried, and sentenced to death the next day. On 12 November 1793, he was guillotined at the Champ de Mars, a site selected symbolically as the location of his betrayal of the republican movement. The little red flag he had used to give the order to fire on the crowds on the Champ de Mars was tied to the cart that took him to his death, and burned in front of him before he was executed. It was the revival of this event as a part of republican heritage after 10 August 1792, as well as a campaign of municipal persecution led by Marat, that ultimately resulted in Bailly's execution, as well as that of "many of his colleagues". Before his death, he was forced to endure the freezing rain and the insults of a howling mob. When a scoffer shouted, "Tu trembles, Bailly?" ("Do you tremble, Bailly?"), he responded, "Oui, mais c'est seulement de froid" ("Yes, but it is only the cold").

== See also ==
- Royal Commission on Animal Magnetism – 1784 French scientific bodies' investigations involving systematic controlled trials
