= King's ban =

Exercise of royal jurisdiction

Königsbann, literally king's ban (Latin: bannus, more rarely bannum, from the OHG: ban), was the exercise of royal jurisdiction in the Holy Roman Empire.

A specific ban (German: Bann) identified:

- the actual order or prohibition
- the penalties for contravening the ban
- the region to which the ban applied

The king's ban in the legal history of the Holy Roman Empire was divided into several distinct types depending on their function:

- Heerbann, the right to raise an army,
- Blutbann (blood courts; high jurisdiction which included capital punishment),
- Friedensbann (special royal protection of people and property),
- Verordnungsbann (the authority to decide legal standards) and
- Verwaltungsbann (the force to be used).

The king used a so-called Bannleihe ("ban investiture") to transfer (invest) the ban, especially the Blutbann, to counts or advocates to exercise.

== See also ==
- Imperial ban, decree of outlawry in the Holy Roman empire
- Anathema, called Kirchenbann in German

== Literature ==
- Mittellateinisches Wörterbuch, I 1967, Sp. 1341 - 1348 s.v. bannus
- Heinrich Mitteis; Heinz Lieberich, Deutsche Rechtsgeschichte. Ein Studienbuch. Munich, 1974 u.ö.
