= Nan-sous-Thil =

- Commune
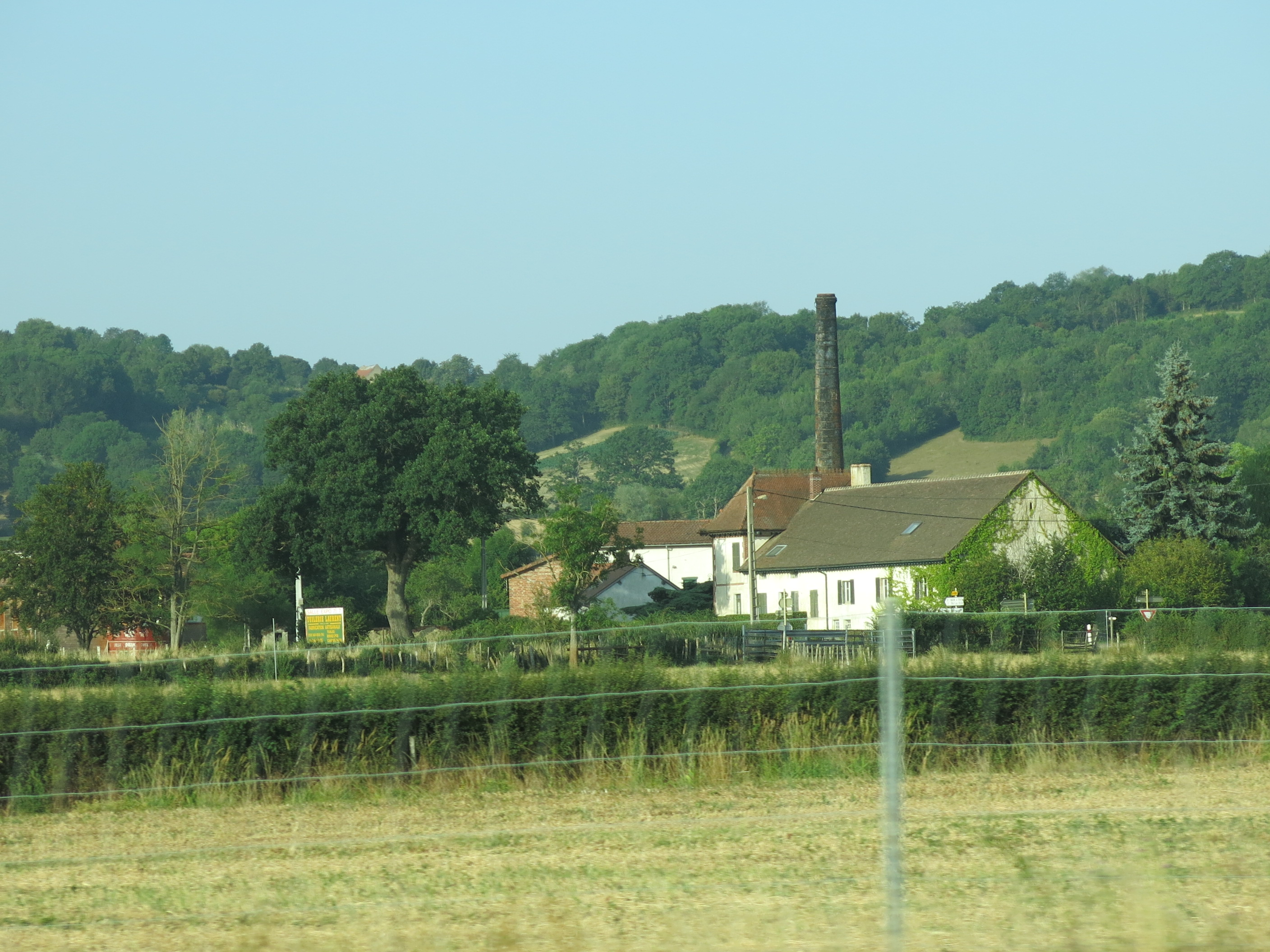
- Tuilerie Laurent in Nan-sous-Thil
- Location of Nan-sous-Thil
- Location within France Location within Bourgogne-Franche-Comté
- Coordinates: 47°22′30″N 4°21′35″E
- Country: France
- Region: Bourgogne-Franche-Comté
- Department: Côte-d'Or
- Arrondissement: Montbard
- Canton: Semur-en-Auxois

Government
  - Mayor (2020–2026): Jean-Denis Baulot
- Area^{1}: 10.99 km^{2} (4.24 sq mi)
- Elevation: 400 m (1,300 ft)
- Highest elevation: 465 m (1,526 ft)
- Lowest elevation: 323 m (1,060 ft)
- Population (2023): 169
  - Density: 15.4/km^{2} (39.8/sq mi)
- Time zone: UTC+01:00 (CET)
  - Summer (DST): UTC+02:00 (CEST)
- INSEE/Postal code: 21449 /21390
- ^{1} French Land Register data, which excludes lakes, ponds, glaciers > 1 km^{2} (0.386 sq mi or 247 acres) and river estuaries.

Nan-sous-Thil (French pronunciation: [nɑ̃ su til], literally Nan under Thil) is a commune in the Côte-d'Or department in eastern France.

== Population ==
Historical population
Year	Pop.	±% p.a.
1968	249	—
1975	174	−4.99%
1982	185	+0.88%
1990	164	−1.49%
1999	175	+0.72%
2007	181	+0.42%
2012	202	+2.22%
2017	185	−1.74%
2023	169	−1.50%
Source: INSEE

== Notable residents ==
- François Rouget (1811–1886), wood-engraver, was born in Nan-sous-Thil.

== See also ==
- Communes of the Côte-d'Or department
