= Heerbann =

General proclamation to defend the state in the Holy Roman Empire

The Heerbann (also formerly Heermannie, MHG herban, OHG: heriban, Mid. Latin: Heribannus), in the Imperial Military Constitution (Reichsheeresverfassung) of the Holy Roman Empire, was the call to all free landowners capable of bearing arms to participate in a military campaign, i.e. in an imperial war (Reichskrieg).

According to the original meaning of the word (OHG: bannan = to 'demand' or 'prohibit', actually 'to speak'), the Heerbann was a 'call of the king or duke to military service; see also king's ban.

However, as the feudal system in the Holy Roman Empire developed in the Early Middle Ages, the Heerbann became superfluous as a means of raising armies and increasingly fell into disuse after the death of Charlemagne.

The Heerbann was particularly onerous for poorer landowners, several of whom had to equip a knight for war (one for every 3 hides), so they would attempt to withdraw themselves from his service and place themselves in the service of and under the protection of a more powerful lord, who would assist them in providing the necessary military equipment or even stand them down from military service entirely.

Towards the end of the 10th century, this led to the reshaping of the entire military constitution. The armies of the king now no longer consisted of all free knights, but came from powerful imperial officials or vassals and their entourages; and those who rendered no military service had to pay a campaign tax (Heersteuer).

The necessary organisation of the Heerbann, needed thanks to constant campaigning by Charlemagne, was divided by him into seven levels or "shields of knighthood", the so-called Heerschilde. The campaigns, which were fought with the aid of the Heerbann, were called Heerfahrten, the participation of the vassals was known as Heeresfolge.

By the time of the Crusades, when the feudal system had reached its height, the Heerbann had almost totally disappeared in all European states.

This article incorporates text from a publication now in the public domain: Meyers Konversations-Lexikon (1888–1890), 4th edition, Leipzig/Vienna: Bibliographisches Institut.

== See also ==
- Ban (medieval), royal power to command, of which the Heerbann is an example
