= Club Breton =

Group of Bretons representatives attending the Estates General of 1789 in France

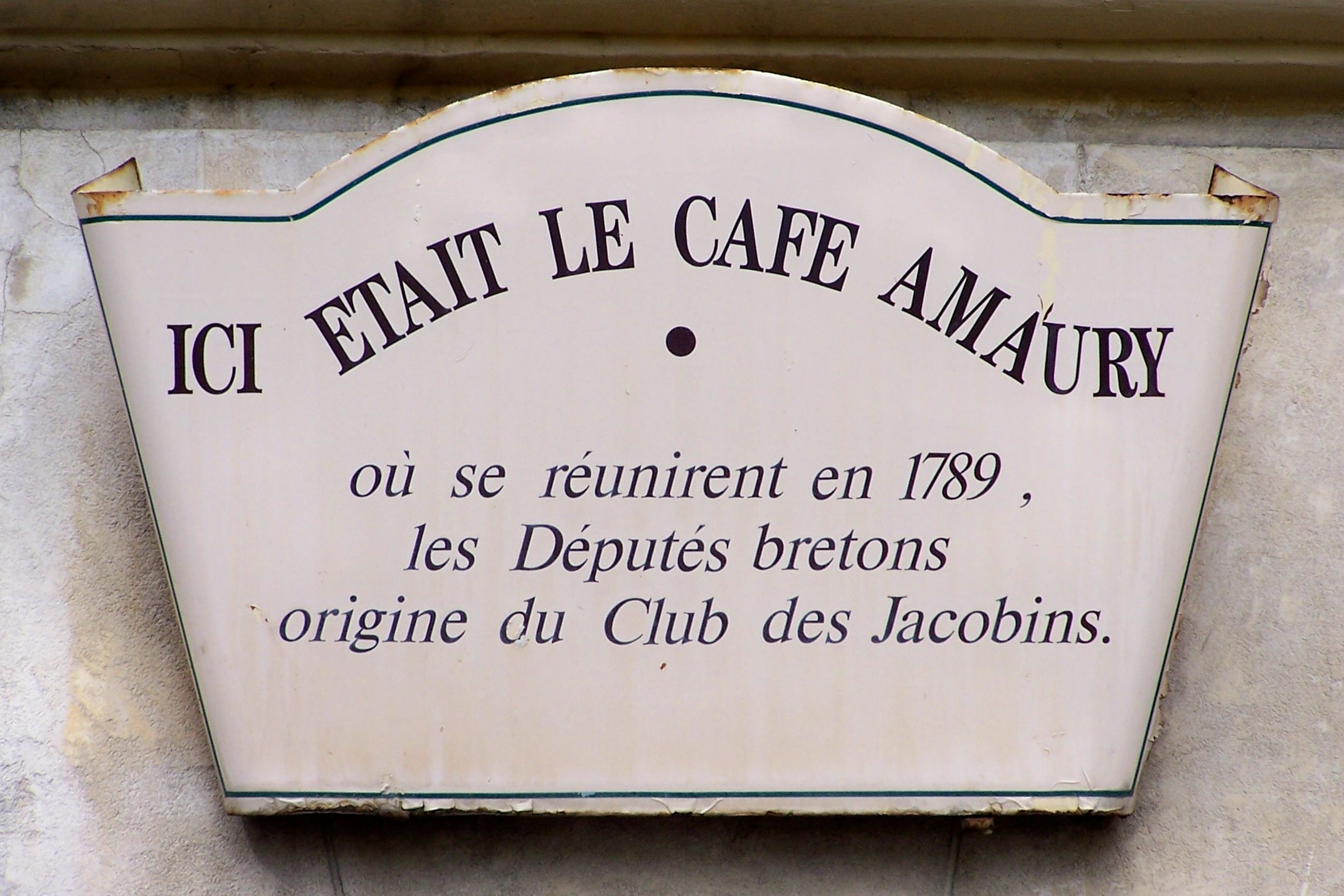
Plaque on the former place of the Café Amaury a Versailles

The Club Breton was a group of Bretons representatives attending the Estates General of 1789 in France.

They usually met in the Café Amaury at the corner of the Saint-Cloud avenue and the Carnot street at Versailles, to debate of the Estates General subjects before the constituency debates concerning Brittany of other subjects. Its influence was much greater than its size, and it became later the Société des amis de la constitution, which finally became the Club des Jacobins.

== Brittany constituency composition ==
The Brittany situation differed from the rest of France, because related to the absence of agreement between the different estates, only the Third Estate and the Minor orders were represented in the Estates General.

The Brittany nobility sent delegates to Versailles to obtain that the election would conform to the old Brittany constitution electoral rules, which stipulated that the delegates would be nominated by the 47 representatives of the 42 towns of the province, excluding small cities and rural areas, without any representatives for the Minor orders.

However, the Brittany Third Estate sent its own delegation and was allowed to send its own delegates.

The nobility and the Major orders answer was to refuse to elect representatives on 16 April 1789 at Saint-Brieuc. The Minor orders then took their place, and the Third Estate ensured that no nobility could be part of its own representatives.

== Extension of the club ==
The representatives from Brittany were the first to encourage the reunion of the three orders in the Legislative Assembly, arguing that the Third Estate was the only Nation representative, which was agreed on the 17 June 1789.

Just before the 20 June 1789, the number of the club personnel was almost 200 people.

After the Tennis Court Oath, the Brittany priests joined the club.

== Toward the Club des Jacobins ==
After the transfer of the March on Versailles in October 1789, the club reverted to being a provincial caucus for National Constituent Assembly deputies from Brittany. As of October 1789, the group rented for its meetings the refectory of the monastery of the Jacobins in the Rue Saint-Honoré, adjacent to the seat of the Assembly. The name Jacobins, given in France to the Dominicans (because their first house in Paris was in the Rue Saint-Jacques), was first applied to the club in ridicule by its enemies.

== See also ==
- Jacobin
