= John and William Merfold =

Leaders of a 1451 English rebellion

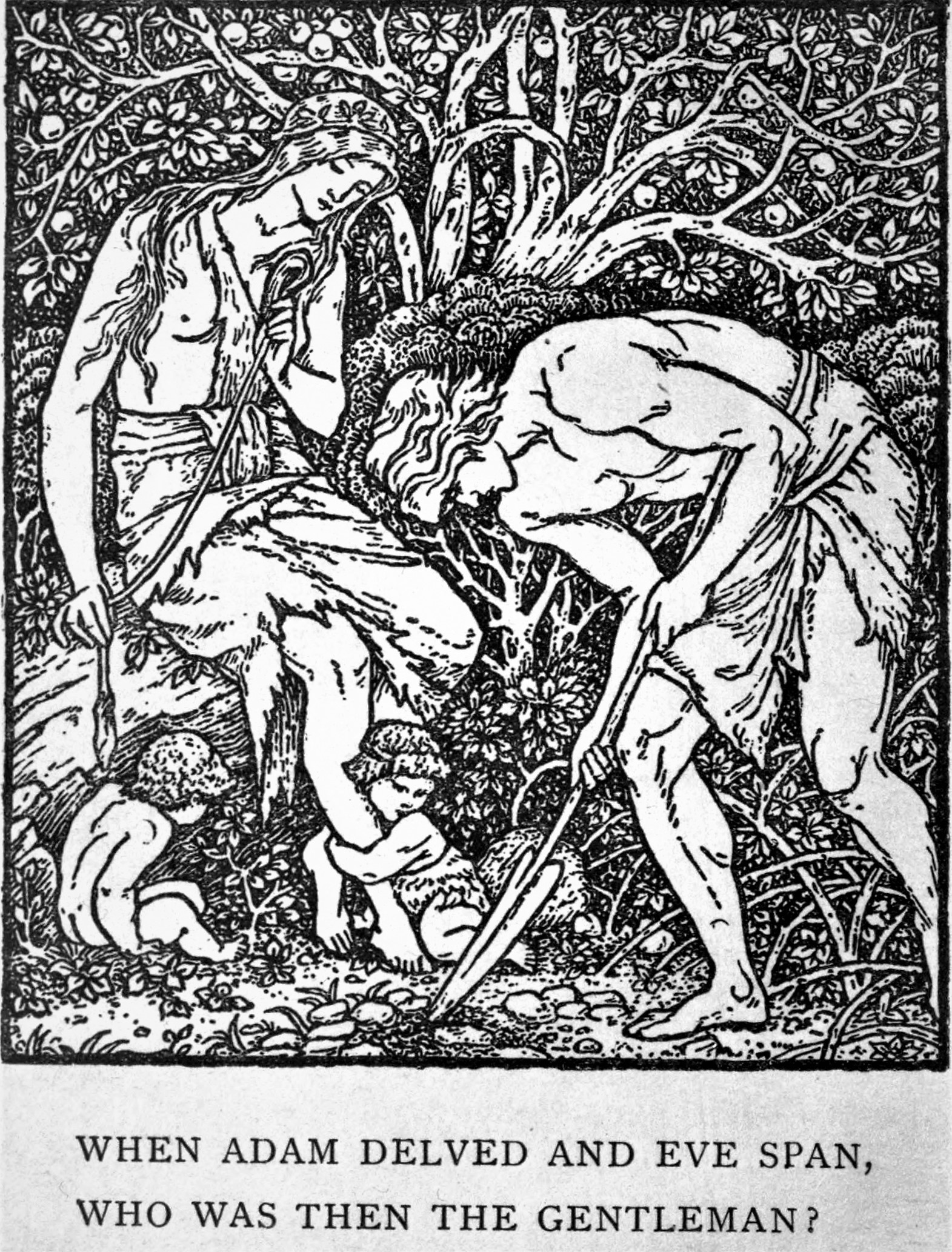
Medieval English labourers depicted in the title page to William Morris's A Dream of John Ball (1888)

John and William Merfold were yeomen brothers in Sussex, England, in the mid 15th-century. Both were indicted in 1451 for publicly inciting the killing of the nobility and the clergy and the deposition of King Henry VI. They also advocated rule by common people. Minor uprisings spread throughout Sussex until authorities intervened and four yeomen were hanged.

The actions of the Merfolds followed a major rebellion in Kent in 1450 led by Jack Cade. They are considered demonstrative of underlying class and social conflicts in England during the 15th century.

== Background: social unrest in 15th-century England ==
For 150 years after the beginning of the Black Death in 1348–1349, England's population and economy were depressed. The decline was most acute between 1440 and 1480. Known in England as the Great Slump, it affected all Europe. It had a disastrous effect on lords and peasants alike, and England's economy only recovered in the 1470s when prices began to recover.

The Slump was produced by a range of forces. A series of harsh winters in the 1430s had ended with three disastrous harvests. A shortage of coinage and a reduction in credit throughout Europe peaked in the 1460s, caused by an imbalance of payments for imported luxury goods and a reduction in output of the continent's silver mines. As the economy shrank, national exports, which had reached a peak in the 1440s, fell by half within two decades, and a collapse in the overseas trade of wool caused its price to fall. Wool workers became unemployed, and the general economy suffered as a result. The situation was worsened when the actions of the English government caused the Hanseatic League to embargo English exports. England lost its Flemish market because of conflict between England and Burgundy, and disrupted the French market up with the loss of English territory in France during the Hundred Years War. Regions critical to English trade were devastated and with the loss of Gascony the wine trade collapsed.

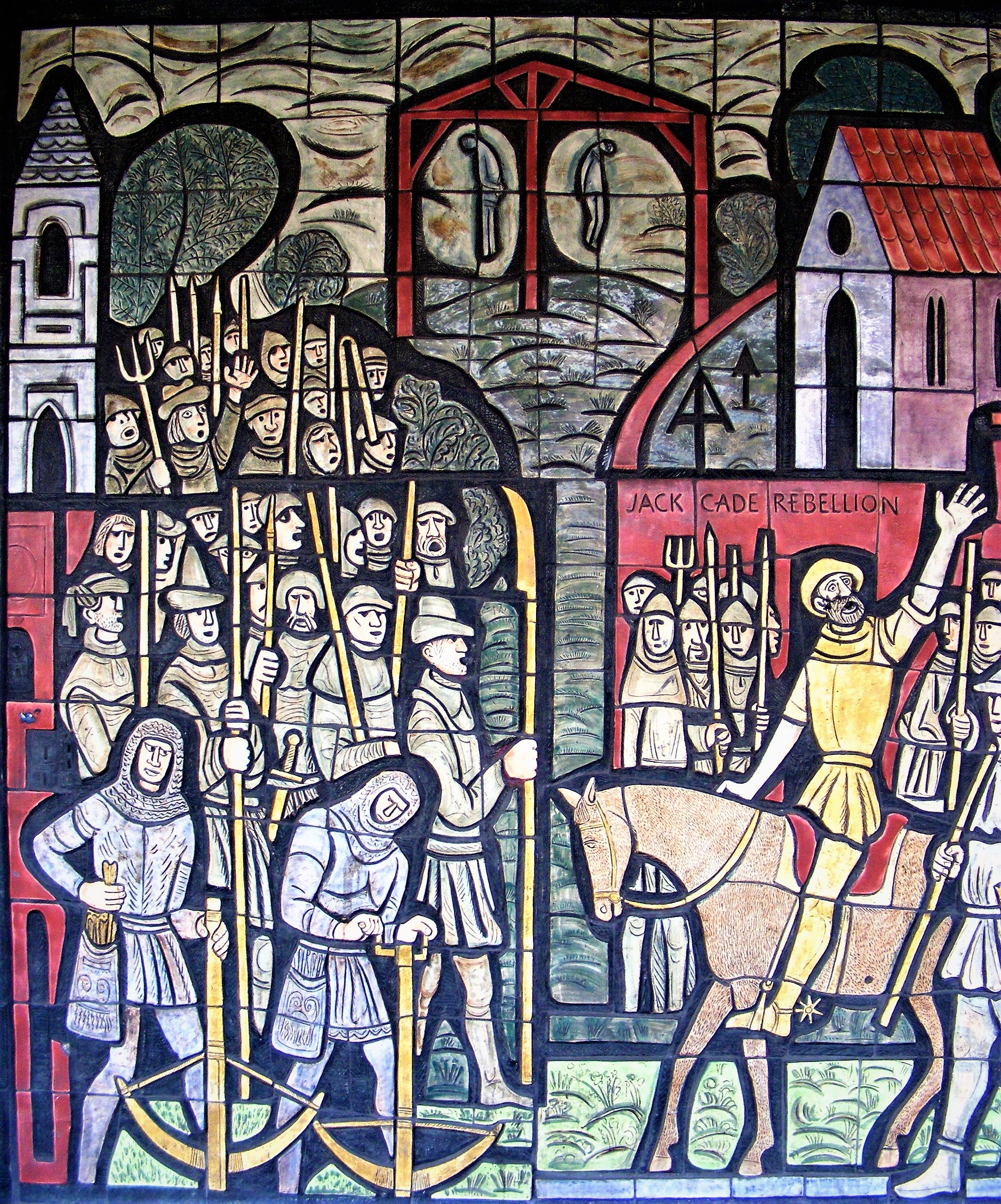
Jack Cade's Rebellion depicted on the mural on the Old Kent Road in London

Although Henry VI of England and his government's policies had contributed to the economic depression, some of the king's subjects in Kent and elsewhere placed all the blame for their economic hardship on Henry.

For artisans or labourers who had previously known greater prosperity, even small fines, chevage, and customary emblems of authority became intolerable. In East Anglia, surviving records such as articles of impeachment from 1449 to 1450 against William, Duke of Suffolk, suggest that he used his access to the courts and regime to oppress his tenants and advance himself personally. These injustices and what the medieval historian A. J. Pollard has described as the "systematic abuse of power in the king's name" were worst in Kent, but also occurred in Sussex and elsewhere in southern England, and led to a series of insurrections. In January 1450 an uprising was led by a labourer named Thomas Cheyne, who called himself "the hermit Bluebeard", occurred in Kent; the authorities acted swiftly and Cheyne was executed as a traitor. In May 1450, a major rebellion by the men of Kent led by Jack Cade marched towards London, forcing the king to retreat to Kenilworth Castle in Warwickshire. The rebels were able to take the capital before their defeat at the hands of the militia of London, which forced them to disperse and return home.

The collapse in public trust was deeply unsettling to the nobility. A complaint was made by members in the House of Commons, and recorded in 1450 in the proceedings of Parliament within a Roll of Parliament, that without peace and prosperity, the year saw many "murders, manslaughters, rapes, robberies, riots, affrays, and other inconveniences greater than before". While Henry VI showed clemency by issuing official pardons to the rebels during the revolt, he was merciless to Jack Cade and his followers. Cade was hunted down and captured, and died of his injuries whilst being taken to London. His body was put on trial before being quartered and displayed around the kingdom. Following the rebellion, there were further uprisings against the government.

== Uprisings of autumn 1450 ==
The rebels were offered free royal pardons by the king; the Archbishop of Canterbury and Cardinal John Kemp attempted without success to persuade the rebels to seek a royal pardon, but Cade reached a settlement with the authorities after he presented the rebels' petitions and was offered a pardon for them in return. The opportunity was taken by over than 3000 people, many of whom had taken no part in the rebellion. The Duke of Buckingham was given permission to seek out the remainder of Cade's followers and bring them to trial. They were later hunted by royal forces and either imprisoned or killed.

[They said] "the kyng was a natell fool, and wold ofte tymes holde a staff in his hands with a brid on the ende playing therewith as a fool, and that anoder kyng must be ordeyned to rule the land," (saying that the king was no person able to rule the land.)

— John and William Merfold, Indictment (1451)

On 26 July 1450—a fortnight after Cade's death—or possibly earlier, John and William Merfold, who were "small scale victuallers" from Salehurst in East Sussex, stated in a public market that the king was a "natural fool" and should be deposed: (Note: Henry VI began the first of his mental breakdowns three years later.)

In August, William Howell of Sutton encouraged men from the towns of Chichester, Bramber, and Steyning to join him in rebellion, and asked that constables and their men join him after "Seynt Bartolomew's day," 27 August. In September 40 men prepared for war came to Eastbourne. In October, John Merfold declared in an alehouse that the people would rise and "wolde leve no gentilman alive but such as thyme list to have." Throughout October and November, men armed with clubs and bows congregated near Horsham, Robertsbridge, and throughout Wealden.

Throughout Sussex, bands beat and pillaged noblemen and clergy, motivated either by class hostility or engaged in petty criminality. At Robertsbridge they objected to dues collected by the local clergy, and at Eastbourne, to high land rents. Rebels at Hastings declared their desire for a new king, and chastised rebels from Kent for capitulation following Jack Cade's rebellion.

== Defeat ==
During Easter week in the spring of 1451, men gathered at Rotherfield, Mayfield, and Burwash in Sussex, and in some settlements within Kent. Most were young, and their number included skilled craft workers. Indictments show that few were agricultural laborers or husbandmen, and fewer still were landless. The rebels demanded that Henry be deposed, all lords and higher clergy be killed, and that 12 of their own number be appointed to rule the land. According to indictments prepared at the time:

[The rebels wished] as lollards and heretics, to hold everything in common.

— The King's Prosecution, Indictment, 1451

Royal authorities responded swiftly by arresting suspected rebels. Four Sussex men were hanged, and resistance broken.

== Significance of the brothers' actions ==
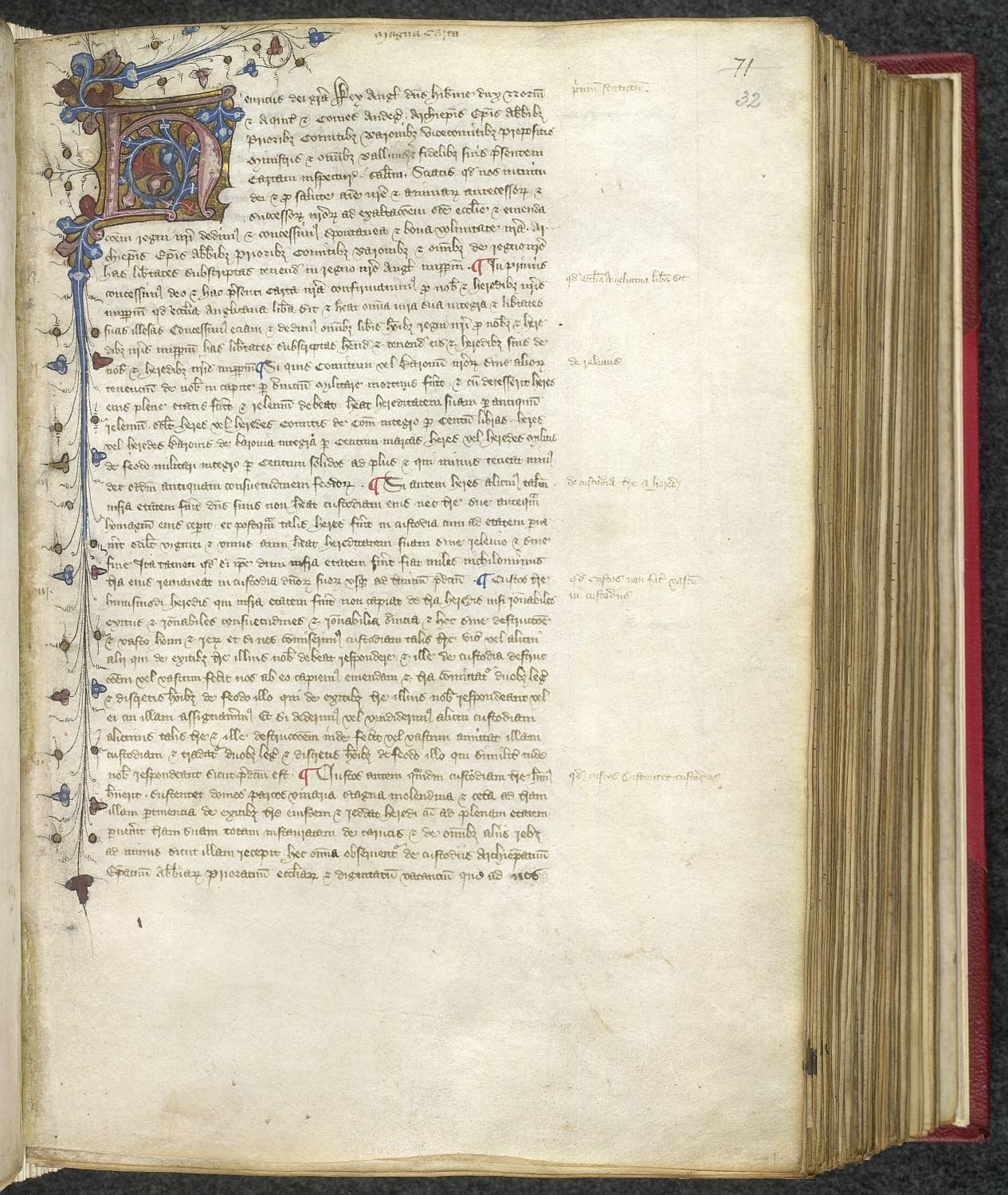
A version of Magna Carta of 1217, produced between 1437 and c.1450.

Most peasant rebellions, including the Peasants' Revolt of 1381, expressed some faith in existing social harmony and the King's willingness to support their cause. One manifesto produced by the Kentish rebellion led by Jack Cade declared, ""we blame not all the lordys… ne all gentyllmen, ne yowmen, ne all men of law, ne all bysshops, ne all prestys, but all such as may be fownde gylty by just and trew enquiry and by the law." According to Tedj Ghomri, "The Sussex revolts of 1450–1451 incited by the Merfolds had no such faith in the established social order, and threatened to specifically target lords, bishops, priests, and even the king."

Historian David Rollison has argued that the socially and politically radical statements by the Merfolds support the hypothesis that the uprisings were motivated by longstanding class antagonisms. Rollison follows contentions by social historian Andy Wood and the 15th-century English jurist Sir John Fortescue, who argue that the economic recession of the mid-15th century only magnified routine class antagonisms between village communities and the gentry. The idea that even kings could be disciplined or deposed by popular will was a major aspect of English politics in the centuries following the signing of Magna Carta in 1215.

Those in Sussex responding to the Merfolds' declarations were likely motivated by economic and social concerns. These included seigneurial exactions, weeding, reaping, and collection duties, all of which were ignored or denounced by yeomen and labourers during the uprisings. Court rolls from Sussex during the period often mention tenant poverty, inability to pay fines or taxes, and abandonment or land or livestock.

Rebels might also have been influenced by Lollard preachers, five of whom were executed in Tenterden, Kent in 1438.

== Sources ==
- Archer, Rowena E. (1995). Crown, Government and People in the Fifteenth Century. Alan Sutton. ISBN 978-0-7509-0588-6.
- Bohna, Montgomery (2003). "Armed Force and Civic Legitimacy in Jack Cade's Revolt, 1450". The English Historical Review. 118 (477): 563–582. doi:10.1093/ehr/118.477.563. JSTOR 3489286.
- Burrill, Alexander Mansfield (1859). A New Law Dictionary and Glossary. Vol. 2. New York: J.S. Voorhies. OCLC 557539039.
- Day, John (1978). "The Great Bullion Famine of the Fifteenth Century". Past & Present (79). Oxford University Press: 3–54. doi:10.1093/past/79.1.3. JSTOR 650246.
- Hare, J.N. (1999). "Growth and Recession in the Fifteenth-Century Economy: The Wiltshire Textile Industry and the Countryside". The Economic History Review. 52 (1). Oxford University Press: 1–26. doi:10.1111/1468-0289.00116. JSTOR 2598529.
- Harvey, I. M. W. (2004). "Cade, John [Jack] [alias John Mortimer; called the Captain of Kent]". Oxford Dictionary of National Biography (online ed.). Oxford University Press. doi:10.1093/ref:odnb/4292. (Subscription, Wikipedia Library access or UK public library membership required.)
- Hatcher, John (2002). "The Great Slump of the Mid-Fifteenth Century". In Britnell, Richard; Hatcher, John (eds.). Progress and Problems in Medieval England: Essays in Honour of Edward Miller. Cambridge: Cambridge University Press. ISBN 978-0-521-52273-1.
- Hicks, Michael (2010). The Wars of the Roses. New Haven: Yale University Press. ISBN 978-0-300-11423-2. (registration required)
- Kaufman, Alexander L (2020). The Jack Cade Rebellion of 1450: a sourcebook. Lanham: Lexington Books. ISBN 978-14985-5-029-1.
- Martin, Michael (2017). City of the Sun: Development and Popular Resistance in the Pre-Modern West. New York: Algora Publishing. ISBN 978-16289-4-279-8.
- Mate, Mavis (1992). "The economic and social roots of medieval popular rebellion: Sussex in 1450-1451". Economic History Review. 45 (4): 661–676. doi:10.2307/2597413. JSTOR 2597413. (subscription required)
- Mate, Mavis E. (2006). Trade and Economic Developments 1450–1550: The Experience of Kent, Surrey and Sussex. Woodbridge: Boydell Press. ISBN 978-1-84383-189-1.
- Rollison, David (2009). "Class, Community and Popular Rebellion in the Making of Modern England". History Workshop Journal. 67 (67). Oxford University Press: 220–232. doi:10.1093/hwj/dbn077. JSTOR 40646222. S2CID 153626128. (subscription required) Full access available to users of The Wikipedia Library.
- Simons, Eric N. (1963). Lord of London. London: Muller. OCLC 954282716.
