= Feudal duties =

Obligations in a feudal system

Feudal duties were the set of reciprocal financial, military and legal obligations among the warrior nobility in a feudal system. These duties developed in both Europe and Japan with the decentralisation of empire and due to lack of monetary liquidity, as groups of warriors took over the social, political, judicial, and economic spheres of the territory they controlled. While many feudal duties were based upon control of a parcel of land and its productive resources, even landless knights owed feudal duties such as direct military service in their lord's behest. Feudal duties were not uniform over time or across political boundaries, and in their later development also included duties from and to the peasant population, such as abergement.

Feudal duties ran both ways, both up and down the feudal hierarchy; however, aside from distribution of land and maintenance of landless retainers, the main obligation of the feudal lord was to protect his vassals, both militarily from incursion and judicially via court justice. In addition to lands, the lord could grant what were called "immunities", but were rights to conduct governmental functions such as the collecting of taxes and tolls, the holding of judicial proceedings, and even the coinage of money. In addition there were contingent duties the lord owed such as the duty to take back a fief that was rejected by an heir (droit de déguerpissement). Sometimes, particularly in the Frankish kingdoms, a lord would grant a fief to an assemblage of men rather than to a single vassal. These grants were called bans and included extensive governmental autonomy, or immunities.

Duties owed by a vassal to his lord can be categorised into four types:

- Military (auxilium), which included personal service, providing troops (raising levies), and later scutage (a payment) in lieu of service. Military duties also included work on fortifications and roads and bridges, thus the trinoda necessitas.
- Court duties (consilium), which encompassed everything from security (being a guard) through rendering advice in council, providing squires and even in some cases providing de facto hostages.
- Special taxes (aids), often called feudal aids, were monies due upon certain contingent events, such as contributing to the lord's ransom, or to pageant-like events at court such as royal marriages.
- Incidents, which included such things as a negotiated kickback to the lord upon being granted a fief (politely called a receipt), the duty to feed and house the lord and his retinue when the lord visited (droit de gîte), allowing the lord to hunt or fish on his land (droit de garenne) and being subject to the residual lordly rights of guardianship upon minority inheritance, and forfeiture upon a failure of heirs or failure to observe his feudal obligations.

In Europe, church lands were also held with feudal duties. While some churchmen did provide direct military service, most either hired substitutes, paid scutage, or later converted the duty to one of prayer, frankalmoin.

== List ==
Feudal duties included, but were not limited to:

=== From the Vassals to their Lord ===
- Amober – fee paid to a lord on the marriage of a maiden in his manor
- Appanage – concession of a fief by the sovereign to his younger sons
- Avera and inward – feudal obligations assessed against a royal demesne
- Carucage – land tax based on the size (variously calculated) of the taxpayer's estate
- Castle-guard – provision of knights to guard royal castles
- Chiefage – a poll-money paid to their lords by those who held lands
- Corvée – unpaid, unfree intermittent labour for limited periods of time
- Droit de gîte – duty to feed and house the lord and his retinue when the lord visited
- Droit de garenne – allowing the lord to hunt or fish on a vassal's land
- Feudal aid – payment to a lord on certain occasions, such as the knighting of his eldest son, marriage of his eldest daughter
- Merchet – fee paid on a marriage
- Scot and lot – local levies and their associated obligations and rights, such as for drainage
- Scutage – a payment accepted as an alternative to knight-service
- Taille – a direct land tax on the French peasantry and non-nobles
- Tallage – an occasional payment exacted by king and barons

=== From the Lord to their Vassals ===
- Banalité – Public services provided by the feudal lord (such as community ovens, mills, wine presses, etc.) in exchange for a tribute from the vassals for their economic maintenance.
- Feudal maintenance – money payment to soldiers fighting in the interest and at the command of their lord
- Frankalmoin – land held by an ecclesiastical body free of secular service, commonly in return for religious services.
- Knight-service – tenure of land to a knight in return for military service for his overlord
- Patronage – protection and support to a client, who owed loyalty and service in return
- Socage – tenure of land and provision of certain services (such as protection) to the vassals in return for a specified duty (usually money) to the lord that were different to standard knight-service
- Serjeanty – tenure in return for a specified duty other than standard knight-service
