= Filstingpound =

Feudal duty in medieval England

Filstingpound or fulstingpound was an occasional duty paid by villeins in medieval England to the manor. It is thought by historians to be an insurance against corporal punishment or excessive fines. Its etymology appears to be a compound of the obsolete English word "filsting", which means help or aid; and "pound", in the sense of being struck. The duty was typically annual and received on All Hallows' Day. It was usually £1 paid by the vill or 1 s. by the individual villein. It was a relatively advanced insurance scheme for the High Middle Ages.

== See also ==
These were also customary duties paid to the lord of the manor:

- Merchet
- Chevage
