= Droit du seigneur =

Supposed sexual right of medieval lords

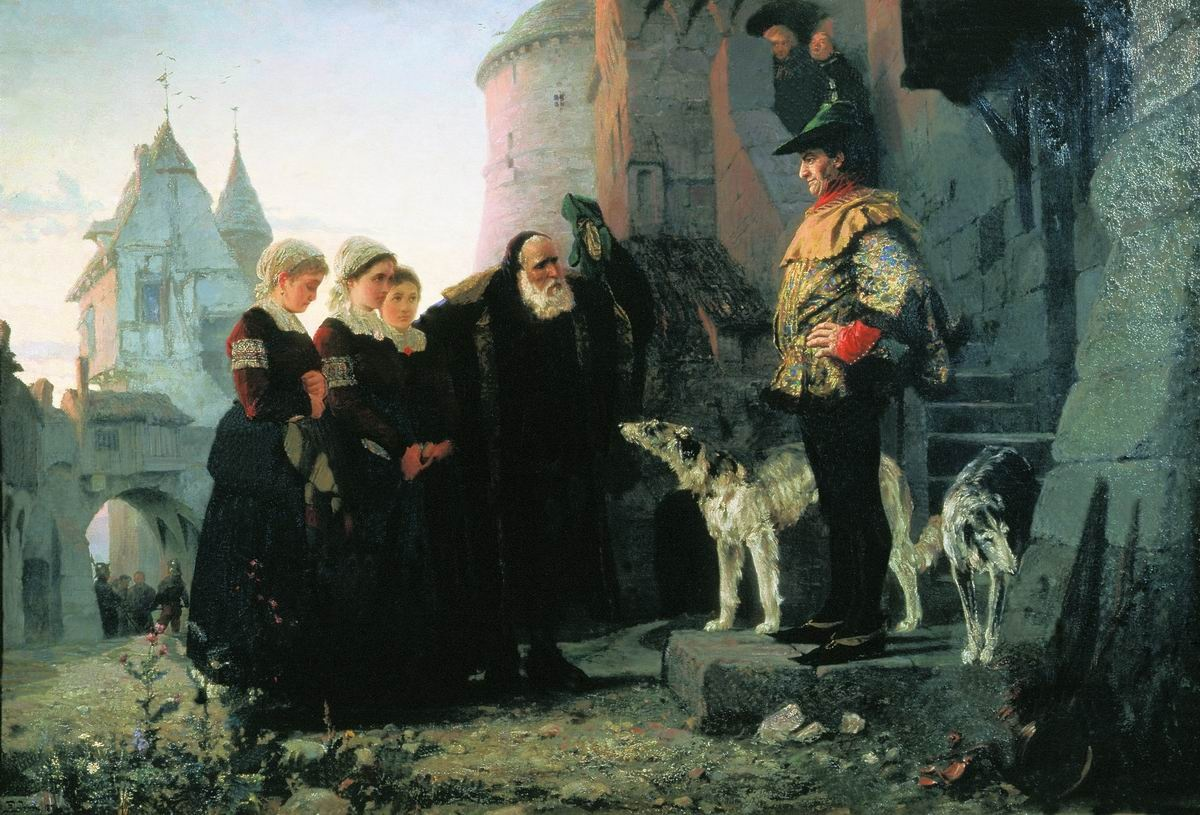
Vasily Polenov: Le droit du Seigneur (1874); artist's interpretation of an old man bringing his young daughters to their feudal lord.

Droit du seigneur (Note: Pronunciation: English: /ˌdrwʌ də sɛnˈjɜːr/ DRWUH də sen-YUR, US also /ˌdrwɑː də seɪnˈjɜːr/ DRWAH də sayn-YUR, French: [dʁwa dy sɛɲœʁ].) ('right of the lord'), also known as jus primae noctis (Note: English: /dʒʌs ˌpraɪmi ˈnɒktɪs/ juss PRY-mee NOK-tiss, Classical Latin: [juːs ˈpriːmae̯ ˈnɔktɪs].) ('right of the first night', recently sometimes incorrectly referred to as prima nocta), (Note: Pseudo-Latin apparently for 'first night', more correctly prima nox or nox prima. The pseudo-Latin expression was popularized through the movie Braveheart.) was a supposed legal right in medieval Europe, allowing feudal lords to have sexual relations with any female subject, particularly on her wedding night. There are many references to the alleged custom throughout the centuries but little evidence that it actually existed.

== Terminology ==
The French expression droit du seigneur translates as "right of the lord", but modern French usage prefers droit de jambage (French: [dʁwa d(ə) ʒɑ̃baʒ], from jambe, 'leg') or, more commonly, droit de cuissage (French: [dʁwa d(ə) kɥisaʒ], from cuisse, 'thigh').

The term is often used synonymously with jus primae noctis, Latin for "right of the first night".

== Ancient times ==
The practice is referenced in the Epic of Gilgamesh, one of the earliest known works of literature. In the narrative, the protagonist's exercise of the right is one of the grievances that led the people of Uruk to pray for a rival (Enkidu) to stop his tyranny.

The Greek historian Herodotus mentions a similar custom among the Adyrmachidae in ancient Libya: "They are also the only tribe with whom the custom obtains of bringing all women about to become brides before the king, that he may choose such as are agreeable to him."

When the plebeians of the Etruscan city of Volsinii rebelled against the aristocrats in 280 BC, the account of Valerius Maximus claims that "[t]hey took their wives for themselves and placed the daughters of the nobles under the jus primæ noctis, while all their former masters on whom they could lay hands were tortured to death."

It is also mentioned in the Babylonian Talmud, Tractate Ketubot 3b. The Talmud discusses what a groom should do in a case of תיבעל להגמון (tibael lehegmon), where a local ruler decrees a bride must be taken to him before their wedding.

== Middle Ages ==
=== Europe ===
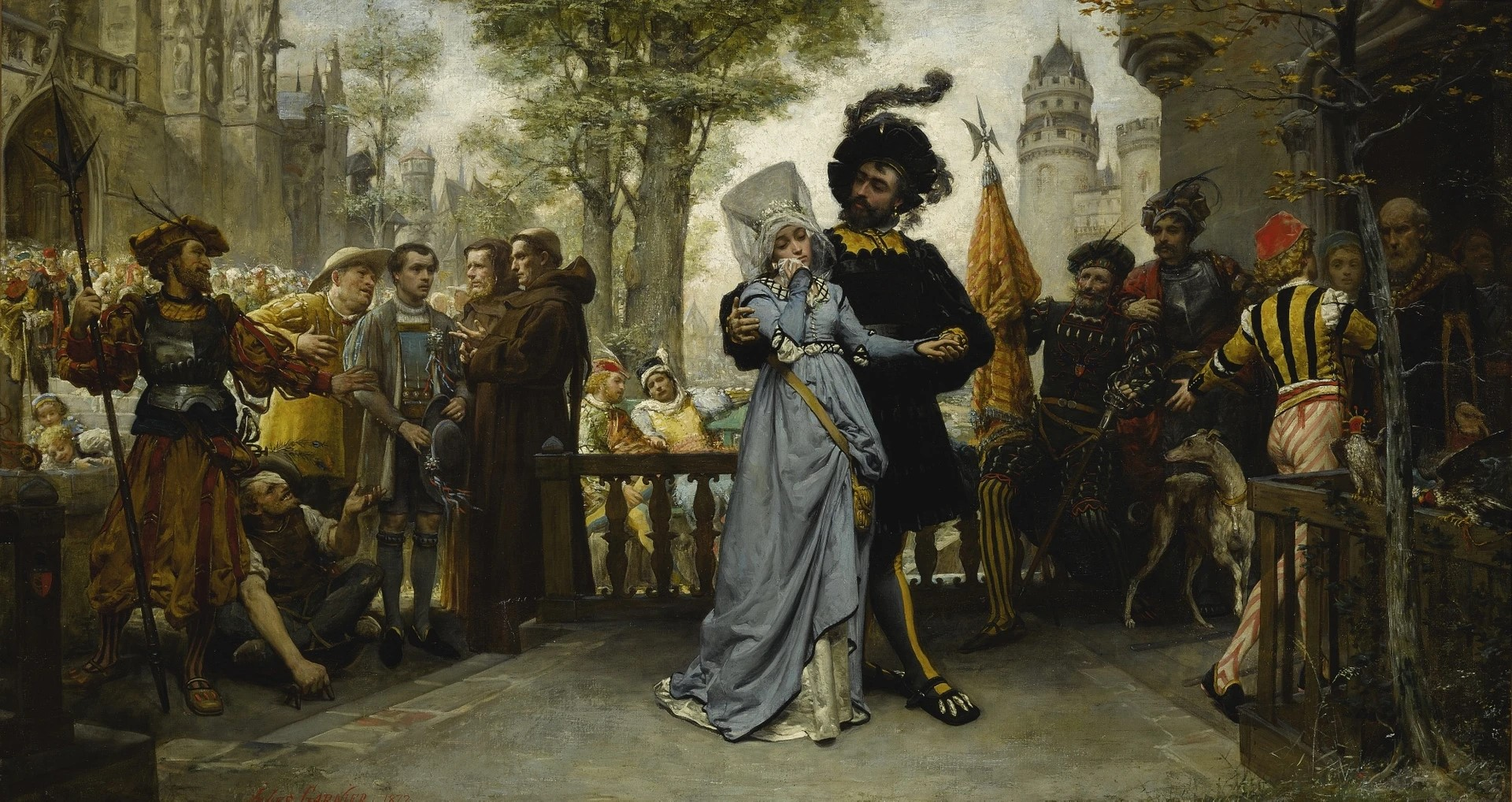
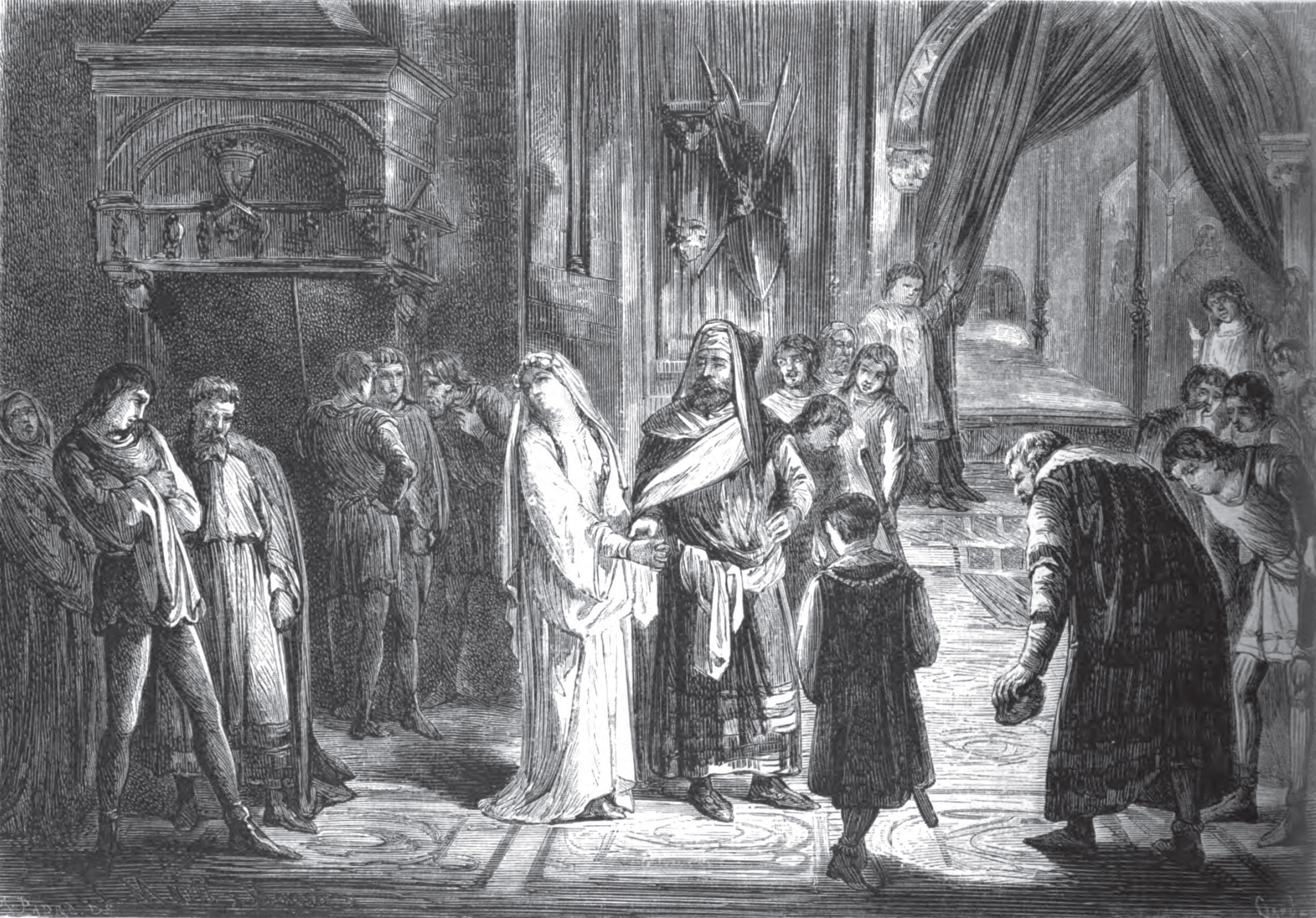
Artistic interpretations by Jules-Arsène Garnier (1872) and José Martí y Monsó (1871) of the theme where a newly-wed woman is taken away by a feudal lord, while her distraught husband looks on.

The medieval marriage fine or merchet has sometimes been interpreted as a payment for the droit du seigneur to be waived. Alternatively, it has been interpreted as compensation to the lord for the young women leaving his lands. Encyclopædia Britannica states that the evidence indicates it was a monetary tax related to vassal marriages, since a considerable number of seigneurial rights revolved around marriage.

A similar payment to church authorities has also been interpreted as relating to the droit du seigneur. However, according to British scholar W. D. Howarth, the Catholic Church at some times prohibited consummation of a marriage on the first night. The payment was for an indulgence from the church to waive this prohibition.

In the Wooing of Emer in Irish mythology the King Conchobar has the droit du seigneur over all marriages of his subjects. He is afraid of Cú Chulainn's reaction if he exercises it in this case, but is equally afraid of losing his authority if he does not. The druid Cathbad suggests a solution: Conchobar sleeps with Emer on the night of the wedding, but Cathbad sleeps between them.

The biography of Gerald of Aurillac written by Odo of Cluny (879–942) gives an account of the young nobleman demanding to rape one of his serfs, only to have the act averted by a miracle, sending Gerald on the road to sainthood. American historian Vern Bullough suggested that this illustrates that such behaviour was commonplace in the period, and that the "legend [of droit du seigneur] reflected the reality".

In the 14th-century French epic poem Baudouin de Sebourc, a tyrannical lord claims the jus primae noctis unless he receives part of the bride's dowry.

The only medieval legal document to mention this practice is Article 9 of Ferdinand II of Aragon's Sentencia Arbitral de Guadalupe in 1486, in which the king forbids lords from having sex with a new bride of a peasant. However, this Article does not suggest that such a right actually existed, as Article 9 lists various abuses that do not derive from any earlier seignorial rights. Furthermore, in an earlier draft document related to the Sentencia, the Catalan lords replied that they doubted that any lord had actually demanded such a practice.

== Post-medieval references ==
=== Europe ===
==== Baltics ====
In 1924, an elderly respondent retold a claim that even at the time of his grandparents' youth, in the early 1800s, the rule of first night had still been in widespread use in western Estonia; whether it had been a legal right he did not elaborate.

==== England ====
In Shakespeare's play Henry VI, Part 2 (c. 1591) the rebel Jack Cade proclaims: "there shall not a maid be married, but she shall pay to me her maidenhead ere they have it". According to the French scholar Alain Boureau, Cade was demanding the payment of merchet, not the right of first night. Howarth states that Cade's payment was simply the lord's compensation for a serf who departed to get married, and had no connection with any sexual "right" to maidens.

The English lexicographer Thomas Blount claimed in his Fragmenta Antiquitatis of 1679 that the "right" had previously existed as a medieval custom of some English manors, but had been commuted into payment of money. However, Howarth points out that there is no evidence that Blount's theory actually reflected the medieval situation.

The Curiosities of Literature (1823) by the British writer Isaac D'Israeli claimed the practice had been widespread across Europe.

==== France ====
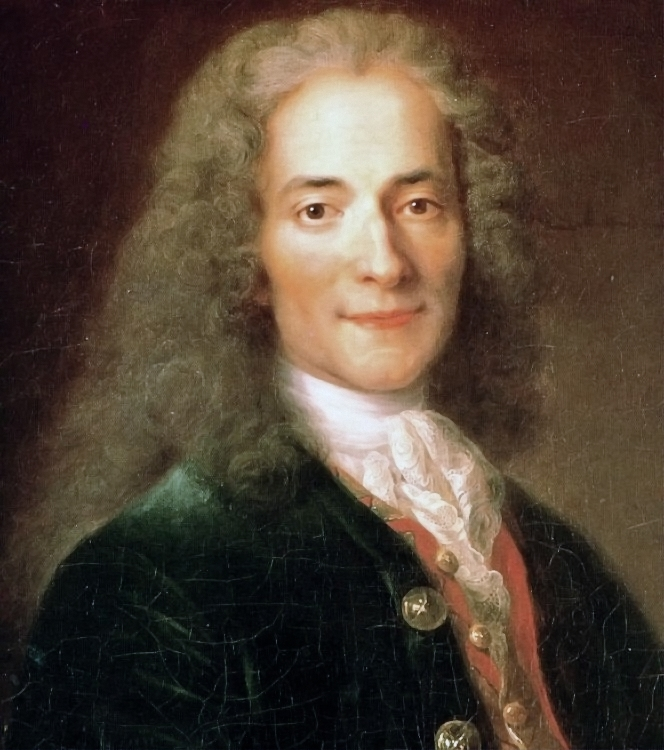
Voltaire, who in 1762 was the first person to use the term droit du seigneur.

The supposed right was mentioned in 1556 in the Recueil d'arrêts notables des cours souveraines de France of the French lawyer and author Jean Papon. Papon's account was vague about attributing where this practice is said to have occurred. The French writer Antoine du Verdier also commented on it in 1577, saying that he had been told that such a right had once existed in Scotland.

The French philosopher Montesquieu referred to the practice in The Spirit of the Laws (1748), saying that it had been enforced in France over three nights, although this was a misinterpretation of the actual medieval practice whereby consummation of marriage was forbidden for the first or first three nights of a marriage, unless waived by buying an indulgence from a bishop or abbot.

Voltaire mentioned the practice in his Dictionnaire philosophique, published in 1764. He wrote the five-act comedy Le droit du seigneur or L'écueil du sage in 1762, although it was not performed until 1779, after his death. This play was the first time the term droit du seigneur was used.

In 19th-century France, a number of writers made other claims about the supposed power of the overlords during the Ancien Régime, such as the droit de ravage (right of ravage; providing to the lord the right to devastate fields of his own domain), and the droit de prélassement (right of lounging; it was said that a lord had the right to disembowel his serfs to warm his feet in).

==== Holy Roman Empire ====
In Mozart's The Marriage of Figaro, which premiered in 1786 with a libretto by Lorenzo Da Ponte, the comic plot revolves around the successful efforts of the young bride and groom, Susanna and Figaro, to block the efforts of the unfaithful Count Almaviva to seduce Susanna. To achieve his aim, the frustrated Count threatens to reinstitute droit du seigneur. It was based on a play of the same title by Pierre Beaumarchais.

==== Italy ====
In the Kingdom of Naples and its Calabrian territories a notable case occurred with the nobleman Francesco Campitelli (1596–1668), count of Melissa and prince of Strongoli, who in 1624 issued an ordinance to reinstate the alleged jus primae noctis over his peasantry in the feudal domain of Melissa. According to local chronicles, the measure provoked popular outrage, and Campitelli's cruelty in enforcing the practice, including the abduction of brides from church following wedding ceremonies, became part of his enduring legend. Although the historicity and legal basis of this alleged right remain unverified, the episode has been cited in regional accounts as an example of feudal excess in southern Italy.

==== Netherlands ====
The Acta Sanctorum ("Acts of the Saints"), published from 1643 onwards, mentions the jus primæ noctis in the hagiographies of St Margaret and St Forannan.

==== Scotland ====
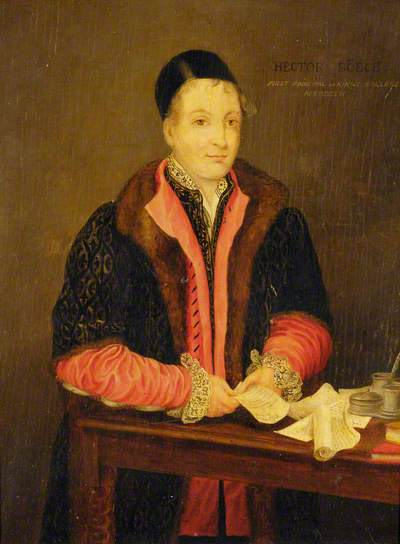
Hector Boece, the first historian to record the droit du seigneur, in 1527.

In 1527, the Scottish historian Hector Boece wrote that the "right" had existed in Scotland until abolished by Malcolm III (r. 1058–93) under the influence of his wife, Margaret (later St Margaret of Scotland). The payment of merchet was instituted in its place. Boece attributed the law to a legendary king, Ewen or Evenus III. The modern French scholar Alain Boureau says that Boece probably invented King Ewen, but he views this as mythology, not as a polemic against medieval barbarism.

Other Scottish scholars of his era quoted Boece with approval, including John Lesley (1578), George Buchanan (1582), and Habbakuk Bisset (1626). The historical existence of the custom in Scotland was also accepted in Scottish legal works such as James Balfour's Practicks (c. 1579), John Skene's De Verborum (1597), and Thomas Craig's Jus Feudale (1603). The English scholar Henry Spelman stated in his Glossary (1664) that the custom had existed in Scotland, but not in England. The English jurist William Blackstone cited Boece's statement in his Commentaries on the Laws of England (1765–1769), while similarly noting that the custom had never existed in England. In 1776, the Scottish jurist David Dalrymple disputed the existence of the custom, arguing Boece's account was purely legendary, but his position was often seen as based on Scottish patriotism. However, according to the Scottish legal scholar David Maxwell Walker, instances have been recorded of the jus primæ noctis being claimed up to the 18th century. Walker concluded that it is possible that the jus existed as a custom in Scotland, dependent on the attitude of the king, and survived longer in remote regions.

After their travels in Scotland in 1773, Samuel Johnson and James Boswell documented the custom of the payment of merchet, linking it with the "right of first night". They paralleled it with that custom of Borough English, suggesting that the English custom favored the youngest son because the paternity of the eldest son was doubtful. Sir Walter Scott mentioned the custom in his historical Scottish novel, The Fair Maid of Perth (1828).

==== Spain ====
The Spanish novel Los trabajos de Persiles y Sigismunda ("The Travails of Persiles and Sigismunda", 1617) by Miguel de Cervantes contains an episode where a bride and groom escape a barbaric marriage custom in Ireland. According to the British scholar W.D. Howarth, Cervantes was inspired by Peruvian marriage ceremonies and what is described is different from the classic version of the droit du seigneur as it involves multiple virgins. However, Cervantes' story was a source for the English play The Custom of the Country, written by John Fletcher and Philip Massinger and published in 1647. The play has the classic version of the "right of first night" with money payment as an alternative. According to Howarth, this suggests that droit du seigneur was a familiar notion to people at that time, which he traces back to Boece.

=== Africa ===
In modern times, Zaire's president Mobutu Sese Seko appropriated the droit de seigneur when traveling around the country, where local chiefs offered him virgins.

=== North America ===
The term has also been used to describe the sexual exploitation of slaves in the United States.

=== Asia ===
As late as the 19th century, some Kurdish chieftains in Anatolia raped Armenian brides on their wedding night (part of what was then known as the khafir or hafir system).

=== Oceania ===
In the Hawaiian Islands, the privilege for chiefs was often observed, according to "Sexual Behavior in Pre Contact Hawai'i" by Milton Diamond. A young girl's parents viewed the coupling with favor. This is because the girl might conceive the chief's child and be allowed to keep it.

== Debate in the 19th and 20th centuries ==
Scholars in the 19th and 20th centuries gave the historical basis of the "right of first night" a good deal of attention. Over time, the Encyclopædia Britannica and the Larousse encyclopedias dramatically changed their opinion on the topic, moving from acceptance to rejection of the historical veracity of the idea.

French writer Louis Veuillot wrote a book in 1854 disputing its existence. After an exhaustive historical study, German jurist Karl Schmidt concluded in 1881 that it was a scholarly misconception. After Schmidt, many of those who believed in the existence of the custom based their opinions on anthropological studies of tribal societies, though according to W. D. Howarth, this was a misguided argument because of the disparity between the tribal societies and medieval European society. In The Origin of the Family, Private Property and the State in 1884, socialist Friedrich Engels argued it was real and had an anthropological origin. Italian scholar Paolo Mantegazza, in his 1885 book The Sexual Relations of Mankind, said that while not a law, it was most likely a binding custom.

In 1910, the Celtic scholar Whitley Stokes said that the existence of the practice was "evidenced though not proved" to have existed in Ireland. In 1930, Scottish legal scholar Hector McKechnie concluded, based on historical evidence, that the practice had existed in Scotland in early times. Historians David M. Walker and Hector McKechnie wrote that the right might have existed in medieval Europe, but other historians have concluded that it is a myth, and that all references to it are from later periods.

== See also ==
- Childwite
- Cuckoldry
- Non-paternity event
- Royal bastard
- Virgin cleansing myth, a belief that having sex with a virgin girl can cure certain diseases (notably AIDS) or otherwise conveys power to a man.
