= Free tenant =

Class of peasant in medieval England

Free tenants, also known as free peasants, were tenant farmer peasants in medieval England who occupied a unique place in the medieval hierarchy. They were characterized by the low rents which they paid to their manorial lord. They were subject to fewer laws and ties than villeins. The term may also refer to the free peasants of the Kingdom of France, part of an ordering of classes with legal privileges who constituted the third estate, a land-owning non-political peasantry, mostly different from other countries with estates.

== Definitions ==
One of the major challenges in examining the free peasants of this era is that no one single definition can be attached to them. The disparate nature of manorial holdings and local laws mean the free tenant in Kent, for example, may well bear little resemblance to the Free Tenant in the Danelaw.

Attempts were made by some contemporary scholars to set out a legal definition of freedom, one of the most notable being the treatise by Ranulf de Glanvill written between 1187 and 1189. This stated that:

He who claims to be free shall produce in court several near blood relatives descended from the same stock as himself, and if they are admitted or proved in court to be free, then the claimant himself will be freed from the yoke of servitude

Another way to identify a freeman in the Middle Ages, was to determine what kind of taxes or laws he had to obey. For example, having to pay merchet, a tax paid upon the marriage of a servile woman, was a key sign of being unfree.

They could get married without permission and they could not be moved between estates against their will.

== See also ==
- Franklin (class)
