= Social changes in 18th to 19th-century Prussia =

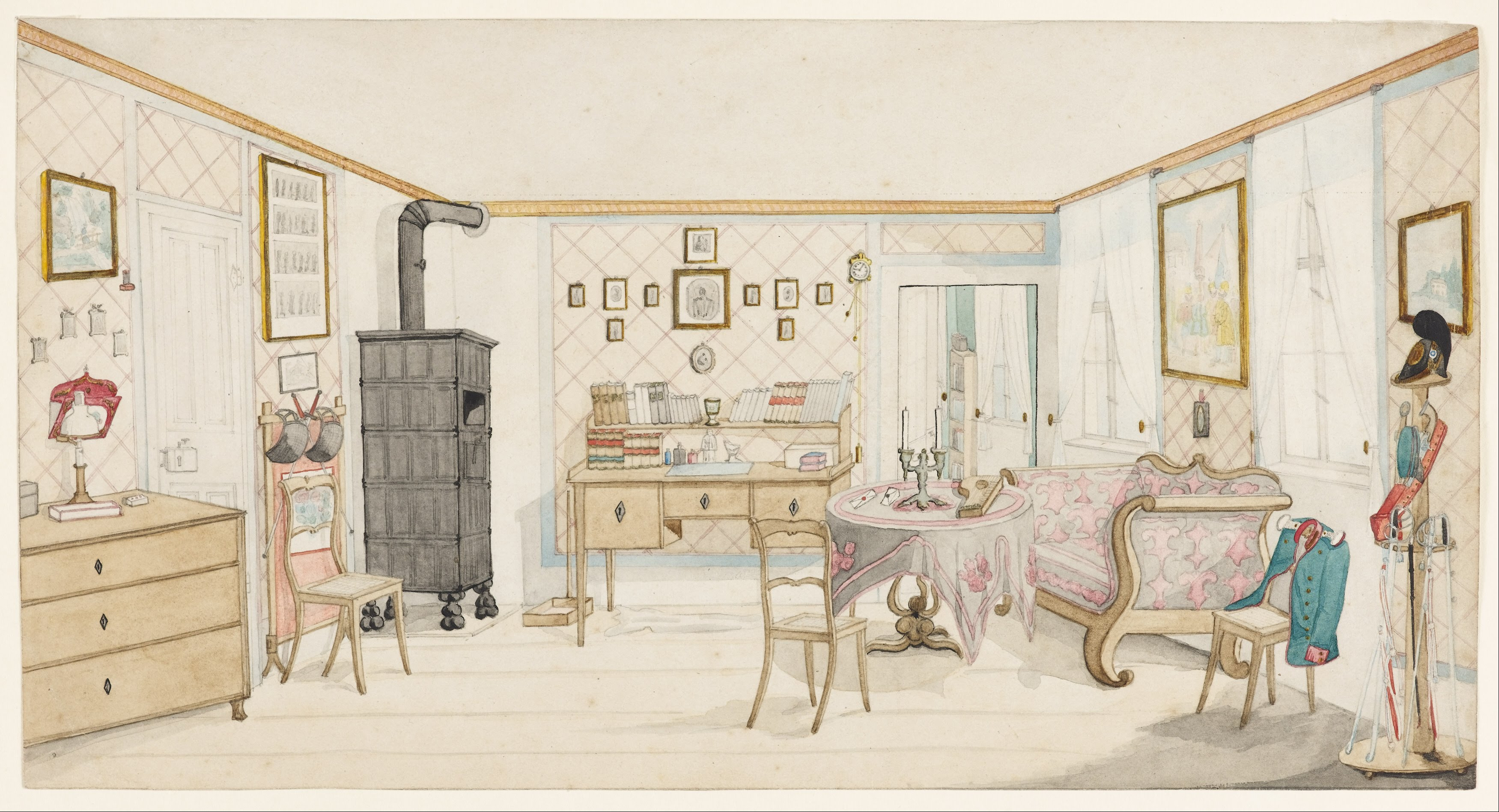
"A Prussian Officer's Quarters, 1830" (Cooper Hewitt Museum)

Prussia underwent major social change between the mid-17th and mid-18th centuries as the nobility declined as the traditional aristocracy struggled to compete with the rising merchant class, which developed into a new Bourgeoisie middle class, while the emancipation of the serfs granted the rural peasantry land purchasing rights and freedom of movement, and a series of agrarian reforms in northwestern Germany abolished feudal obligations and divided up feudal land, giving rise to wealthier peasants and paved the way for a more efficient rural economy.

== Nobility ==
The nobility, represented the first estate in a typical early modern kingdom of Christian Europe, with Germany being no exception. The empire's pluralistic character also applied to its nobility, that greatly varied in power and wealth, ideas, ambition, loyalty and education. However, there existed a distinction between the Imperial nobility, the direct vassals of the emperor and the Territorial nobility, who have received their fief from the territorial princes. Many of whom had been impoverished as their standard of life and culture had declined since the end of the medieval period. In an ever more complex economy, they struggled to compete with the patricians and merchants of the cities. The Thirty Years' War marked the reversal of fortunes for those noblemen, who seized the initiative and had understood the requirements of higher education for a lucrative position in the post-war territorial administration. In the Prussian lands east of the Elbe river the system of manorial jurisdiction guaranteed near universal legal power and economic freedom for the local lords, called Junkers, who dominated not only the localities, but also the Prussian court, and especially the Prussian army. Increasingly after 1815, a centralized Prussian government based in Berlin took over the powers of the nobles, which in terms of control over the peasantry had been almost absolute. To help the nobility avoid indebtedness, Berlin set up a credit institution to provide capital loans in 1809, and extended the loan network to peasants in 1849. When the German Empire was established in 1871, the Junker nobility controlled the army and the navy, the bureaucracy, and the royal court; they generally set governmental policies.

== Bourgeois values spread to rural Germany ==
A major social change occurring between 1750 and 1850, depending on region, was the end of the traditional "whole house" ("ganzes Haus") system, in which the owner's family lived together in one large building with the servants and craftsmen he employed. They reorganized into separate living arrangements. No longer did the owner's wife take charge of all the females in the different families in the whole house. In the new system, farm owners became more professionalized and profit-oriented. They managed the fields and the household exterior according to the dictates of technology, science, and economics. Farm wives supervised family care and the household interior, to which strict standards of cleanliness, order, and thrift applied. The result was the spread of formerly urban bourgeois values into rural Germany.

The lesser families were now living separately on wages. They had to provide for their own supervision, health, schooling, and old-age. At the same time, because of the demographic transition, there were far fewer children, allowing for much greater attention to each child. Increasingly the middle-class family valued its privacy and its inward direction, shedding too-close links with the world of work. Furthermore, the working classes, the middle classes and the upper classes became physically, psychologically and politically more separate. This allowed for the emergence of working-class organizations. It also allowed for declining religiosity among the working-class, who were no longer monitored on a daily basis.

== Peasants and rural life ==
Peasants continued to center their lives in the village, where they were members of a corporate body, and to help manage the community resources and monitor the community life. In the east, they were serfs who were bound permanently to parcels of land. In most of Germany, farming was handled by tenant farmers who paid rent and obligatory services to the landlord, who was typically a nobleman. Peasant leaders supervised the fields and ditches and grazing rights, maintained public order and morals, and supported a village court which handled minor offenses. Inside the family, the patriarch made all the decisions, and tried to arrange advantageous marriages for his children. Much of the villages' communal life centered around church services and holy days. In Prussia, the peasants drew lots to choose conscripts required by the army. The noblemen handled external relationships and politics for the villages under their control, and were not typically involved in daily activities or decisions.

"Peasants in a Tavern" by Adriaen van Ostade (c. 1635), at the Alte Pinakothek, Munich

The emancipation of the serfs came in 1770–1830, beginning with Schleswig in 1780. The peasants were now ex-serfs and could own their land, buy and sell it, and move about freely. The nobles approved for now they could buy land owned by the peasants. The chief reformer was Baron vom Stein (1757–1831), who was influenced by The Enlightenment, especially the free market ideas of Adam Smith. The end of serfdom raised the personal legal status of the peasantry. A bank was set up so that landowners could borrow government money to buy land from peasants (the peasants were not allowed to use it to borrow money to buy land until 1850). The result was that the large landowners obtained larger estates, and many peasants became landless tenants, or moved to the cities or to America. The other German states imitated Prussia after 1815. In sharp contrast to the violence that characterized land reform in the French Revolution, Germany handled it peacefully. In Schleswig the peasants, who had been influenced by the Enlightenment, played an active role; elsewhere they were largely passive. Indeed, for most peasants, customs and traditions continued largely unchanged, including the old habits of deference to the nobles whose legal authority remained quite strong over the villagers. Although the peasants were no longer tied to the same land as serfs had been, the old paternalistic relationship in East Prussia lasted into the 20th century.

The agrarian reforms in northwestern Germany in the era 1770–1870 were driven by progressive governments and local elites. They abolished feudal obligations and divided collectively owned common land into private parcels and thus created a more efficient market-oriented rural economy, which increased productivity and population growth and strengthened the traditional social order because wealthy peasants obtained most of the former common land, while the rural proletariat was left without land; many left for the cities or America. Meanwhile, the division of the common land served as a buffer preserving social peace between nobles and peasants. In the east, the serfs were emancipated but the Junker class maintained its large estates and monopolized political power. Around 1800 the Catholic monasteries, which had large land holdings, were nationalized and sold off by the government. In Bavaria they had controlled 56% of the land.
