= Society in the ancien régime =

French society (late 16th to 18th centuries)

The society of the Ancien Régime refers to the mode of social organization that prevailed in the Kingdom of France from the late 16th century to the late 18th century. The Ancien Régime, in France, is indeed the name given to the political and social organization established during the two centuries prior to the French Revolution.

The French population was then divided into three orders whose functions were hierarchized in terms of dignity: the clergy, the nobility, and the Third Estate ("society of orders"). This separation was based on an ideology and a tradition, not on a criterion of personal merit. The society of the Ancien Régime was also a customary society. and Catholic.

The assertion of royal power was at the origin of the development of an administration that remained relatively modest. The Kingdom of France was an amalgamation of pre-existing communities governed by different statutes, specific to each jurisdictional matter, with overlapping perimeters. The law and judicial system were not unified. At the local level, cities were centers of influence through the control they exerted over their hinterlands, but also over commercial and financial exchanges over greater distances.

The society of orders was destabilized by several developments, such as the devaluation of the traditional nobility's role due to the growth of royal authority or the retreat of religious faith following the Counter-Reformation. The material success of the upper strata of the Third Estate motivated them to seek greater participation in public affairs. Initially expressed mainly through satire, criticism of the order system became more theoretical by the end of the reign of the Sun King, ultimately proposing, with the philosophers of the Enlightenment, a new system of values. The French Revolution put an end to the society of orders.

== Structure of the Ancien Régime society ==
=== Foundations ===
In the society of the Ancien Régime, individuals had a social and legal existence through the communities they belonged to and which represented them. Each body, each community, each estate had its status, duties, and privileges that identified and distinguished it from others. It was not the individual who had a legal personality or political existence, but the group. Thus, there was a multitude of groups: families, trades, rural communities or cities, seigneuries, religious orders, etc. Consequently, in the numerous elections, it was not individuals who voted, but the head of each community.

==== Society of orders ====
The social organization in three orders

As in all of Christendom, and in accordance with the Catholic magisterium, society was conceived as an organic whole where each part lived in symbiosis with the others. Under the Ancien Régime, society was divided into three orders corresponding to three functions. Each of the three orders, defined since the Middle Ages, was meant to complement the other two: monks prayed for the salvation of laypeople; knights used their weapons to serve the Church and protect the weak; finally, peasants cultivated the land to feed the first two orders. The functions were hierarchized in terms of dignity, meaning the spiritual logic of the first order prevailed over the political logic of the second, which in turn prevailed over all economic considerations.

The society of the Ancien Régime was thus the opposite of a materialist society where the economy imposed its logic on the entire society. Indeed, noble conduct was that which sacrificed for honor (for the general interest), while economic activity sought profit. Within each order, this hierarchy was applied to organize all social functions. Thus, in the economic order, the primary sector was considered the most dignified (agriculture, mining, fishing, forestry), followed by craftsmanship, then trade and commerce, which were just above the most base professions: usury (banking) and prostitution. Profit was greater for the usurer than the merchant, and for the merchant than the farmer.

The first two orders had costly public service functions to fulfill. Indeed, the clergy was responsible for public worship, civil records, public education, and social assistance. The nobility took on regalian functions, such as defending society through the army and justice, and high administration. Meanwhile, the third order, which encompassed all economic activities, had lucrative functions. As a result, most taxes fell on the third order to support the first two.

==== Historical origins of the society of orders ====
This ideological system of tripartition in medieval Christian society was identified as characteristic of Indo-European societies under the name of trifunctionalism by the comparatist and philologist Georges Dumézil. It existed in the Christian Roman Empire (the sacerdotes, nobiles, and pauperes) and in Irish texts from the 8th century (the druíd trained by druids and priests, the fláith formed by the military aristocracy, and the bó-airig, free men for labor). It was adopted by the monks Haimo and Heiric of Auxerre in the 9th century and by two Carolingian bishops, Adalberon of Laon and Gerard of Cambrai, who theorized this type of social organization as France faced a political crisis around the year 1000.

In the 16th century, at the time of the rise of absolutism, the jurist Charles Loyseau provided a legal definition of the three orders. He wrote a Traité des ordres et simples dignités in 1610 in which he described the separation of the three orders, which he also called "estates," while emphasizing the obedience owed to the king. He observed that each order was subdivided into more precise categories.

This ideological construction (a dominant class, the bellatores who wield power and the oratores who legitimize it, and a dominated class, the laboratores), described in detail by the historian Georges Duby, who acknowledged his debt to the Marxist theory of historical materialism of Louis Althusser, was revisited by the historian Mathieu Arnoux, who evoked the peasant pride in freely offering their labor in exchange for guarantees ensuring basic means of existence (establishment of agricultural markets, service of the banal mill, tithe used as an instrument of redistribution and assistance). The laborer, through the increase and intensification of his work, became a hero, like Piers Plowman and Adam, the gardener of paradise and the first of the laborers.

==== Catholicism ====
Catholicism was the religion of the Crown. The Protestant Henry of Navarre, though the legitimate heir to the throne, had to convert to become undisputed King of France. During his coronation, the king swore to defend the Catholic Church but also to eradicate heresy from his kingdom.

Alongside the family, the parish was the basic framework for both religious and civil life. The vast majority of French people were guided from birth (with baptism) to death (with extreme unction) by the precepts of the Roman Catholic Church. The Catholic priest was one of the cogs in the life of the village or neighborhood community. He administered sacraments, but he was also a counselor in private matters and a spiritual guide. Each social body had its patron saint. Collective life was punctuated by Catholic religious festivals.

The Protestant worship, whose existence was strongly contested by an influential part of Catholic opinion, was finally authorized but restricted by the Edict of Nantes in 1598. The Catholic worship, restored by force where it had become impracticable, experienced a new surge within the framework of the Counter-Reformation. This movement encouraged Louis XIV to ban Protestant worship in 1685, at the cost of emigration to Protestant states. As for Jews, they were prohibited from residing in much of the Christian kingdoms.

=== Orders of society ===
==== Clergy ====
The clergy was the first order in the social hierarchy of the early modern period. The clergy held general assemblies and had its own tribunals, the officialities. In principle, it collected the tithe tax, corresponding to a tenth of the harvests and first fruits. In reality, the bulk of its resources came from land rents.

Clerics were exempt from the taille and military service but remained subject to certain taxes such as the jura regalia or the decime. The clergy was responsible, in addition to worship, for civil records, organizing (religious) festivals, public education at both primary school and university levels; it was also responsible for all social and medical assistance functions, creating and maintaining hospitals, hospices, and orphanages.

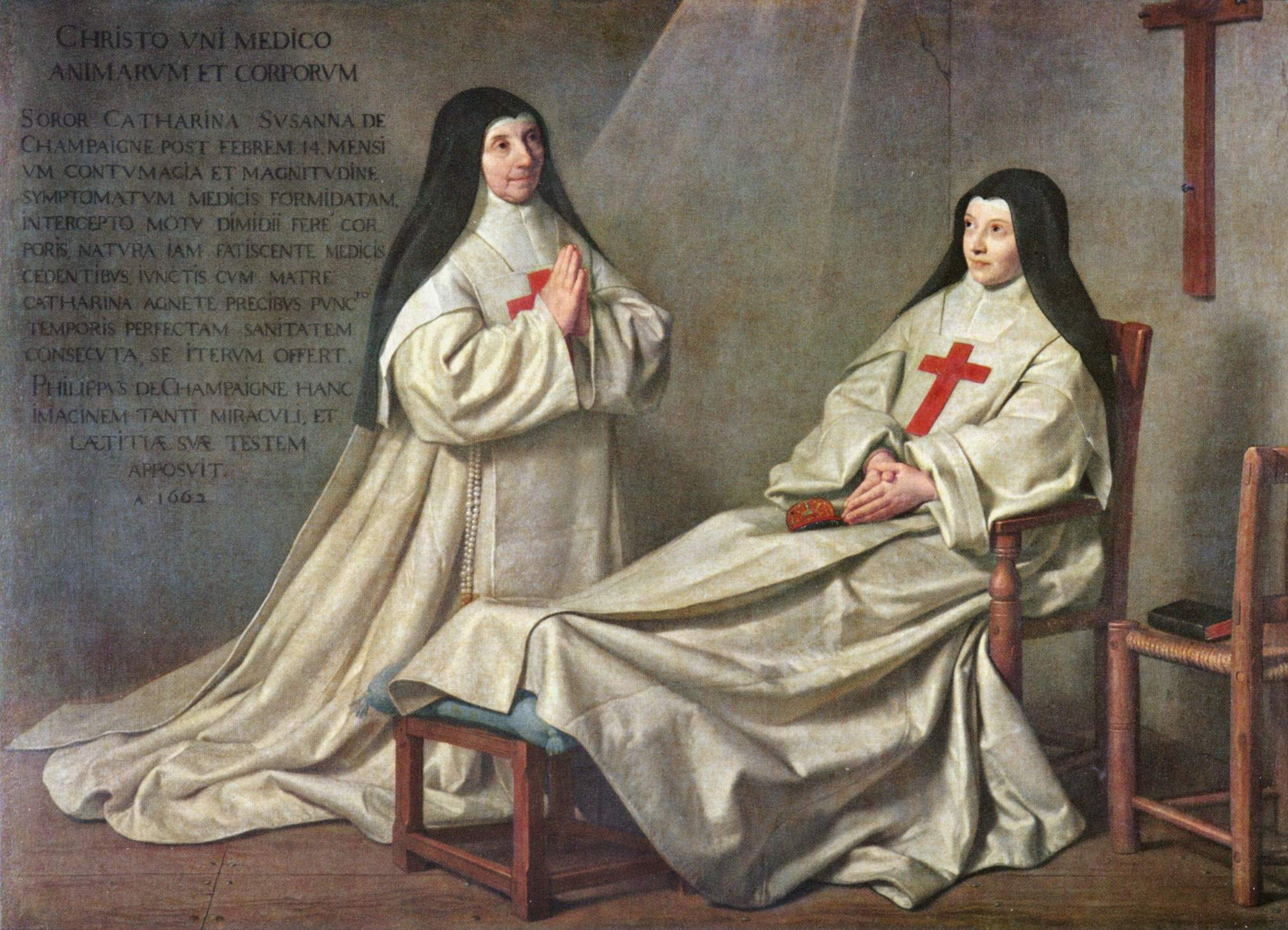
Philippe de Champaigne, Ex Voto de 1662, Louvre; the clergy

The condition of clergy members was extremely varied: members of the high clergy, such as archbishops, bishops, and abbots of large abbeys, often enjoyed significant incomes. Often, though not necessarily, from noble ranks, they were appointed by the king since the Concordat of Bologna, obtained by Francis I in 1516. Less commonly than in Germany, some prelates were also temporal lords: for example, the Bishop of Mende was Count of Gévaudan.

The secular clergy (living in the "world," from Latin sæcularis), among laypeople, played an important role in community life: parish priests and vicars kept baptism and burial registers, administered sacraments like marriage, heard confessions, celebrated Mass, organized festivals, and handled primary education. Parish priests were appointed by a collator, the founder of the parish or their successor. They received a portion congrue of the tithe but were generally protected from destitution. After the application of the Council of Trent, they were required to reside in their parish and were better trained; there was now a seminary in each diocese. France was divided into one hundred forty dioceses of widely varying sizes. They were more numerous in the South, where some episcopal seats were merely large towns.

The regular clergy lived according to the "rule" (from Latin regularis) of an order, abbey, convent, or priory. In the Middle Ages, a distinction was established between contemplative orders devoted to prayer (Benedictines, Cistercians, etc.) and mendicant orders (Franciscans and Dominicans) dedicated to preaching. The orders welcomed younger sons of wealthy families excluded from family inheritances by the primogeniture law.

==== Nobility ====
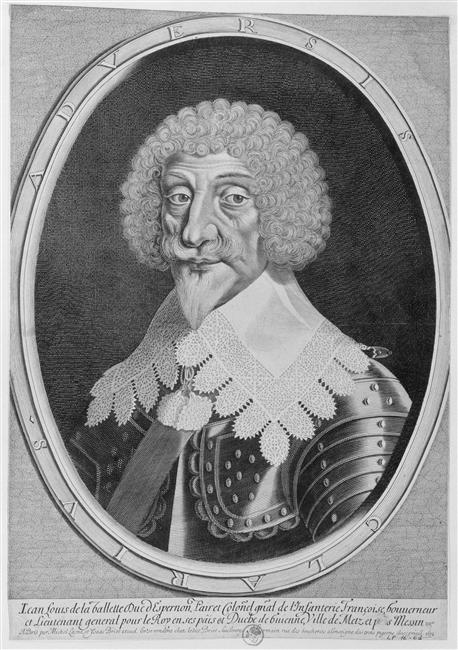
Jean-Louis de La Valette, Duke of Épernon, Colonel General of the Infantry (1632).

In France, the functions and condition of the nobility varied considerably over twelve centuries of royal history. The primary function of the nobility was to ensure peace and justice; it thus held a monopoly on force and warfare. It was not individuals who were noble, but lineages that preserved and hereditarily transmitted noble functions. In the Middle Ages, access to nobility was often through chivalry, which gave it the Christian ideal of using strength to serve the weak. More recent nobility owed its status to the king, who alone had the power to ennoble through letters patent or the sale of offices.

Like the clergy, the nobility enjoyed privileges: it was not subject to the taille, the royal tax. It had the right to carry a sword and to hunt. It was judged by special tribunals. It subsisted on the rent paid by laborers.

The nobility was subject to duties; it had to shed its blood. It had reserved positions in the army and administration, but most professional activities were prohibited.

Any French noble who failed to fulfill these duties could face dérogeance and be stripped of their status.

Becoming noble remained an ideal, but the nobility did not form an organized body. At the top, a few great lords accumulated royal favors, often princes of the blood or frequently favorites or their descendants. Under the Bourbon dynasty, the princes of the blood were mainly the Dukes of Orléans, Princes of Condé, and Conti. At the bottom of the scale, many gentlemen lived modestly on their estates.

An example of a prominent figure of the French nobility is Jean Louis de Nogaret de La Valette (1554–1642), Duke of Épernon.

==== Third Estate ====
The last order of the Ancien Régime society consisted of all those who belonged neither to the clergy nor the nobility and engaged in economic activities: farmers, artisans, and merchants, that is, nine-tenths of the French population. As in the other orders, the condition of commoners was extremely varied: some bourgeois were very wealthy and powerful.

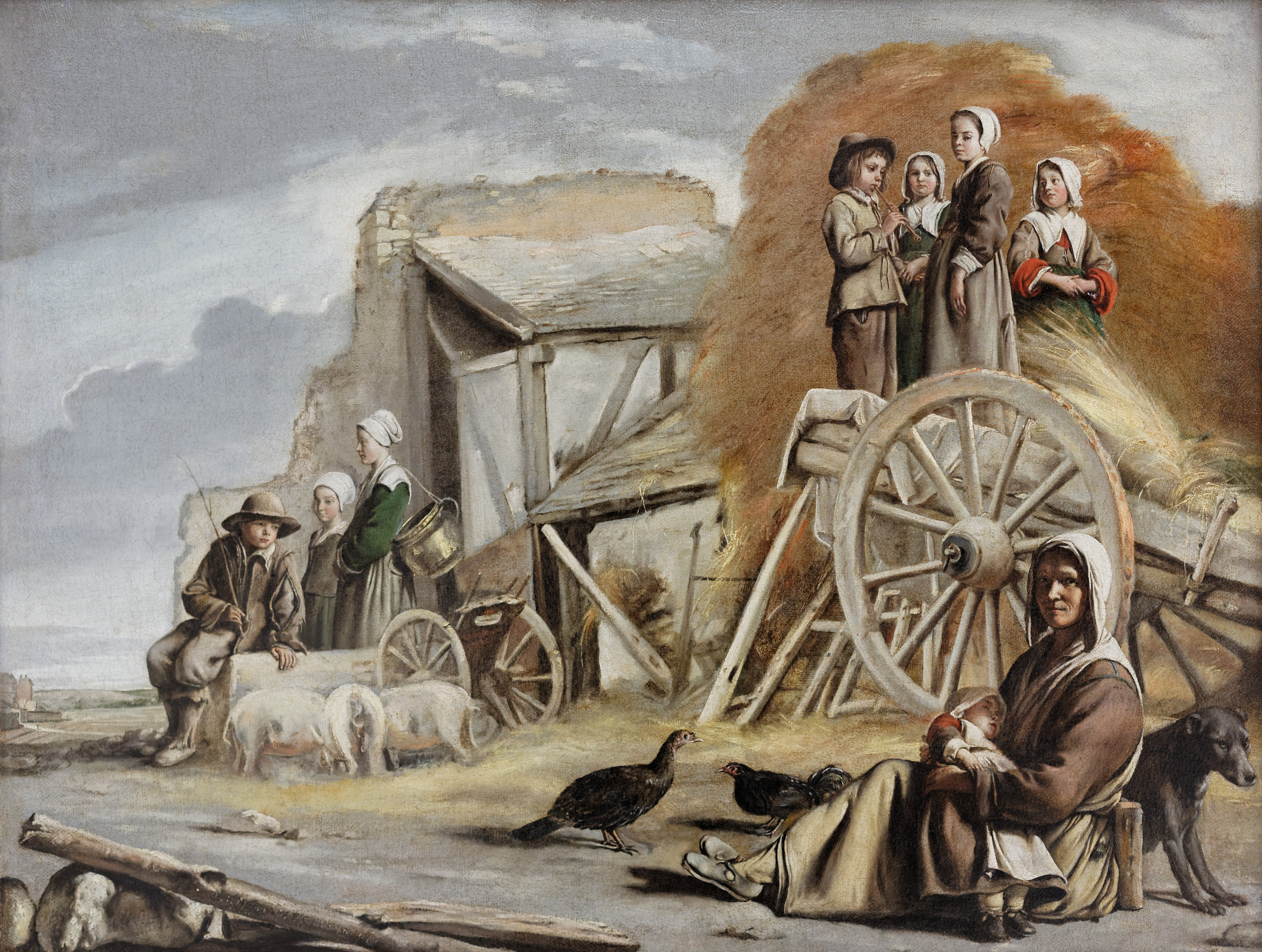
Louis Le Nain, La charrette, 1641, conserved at the Louvre Museum; the rural third estate

The population was predominantly rural. The lives of peasants depended on the abundance of harvests, especially since they were subject to numerous obligations, in particular:

- the payment
  - to the lord
    - of the census, for the use of land
    - of banalités, for the use of the mill, oven, and press
    - of the champart
  - to the clergy of the tithe
  - to the king
    - of the taille on income or landed property
    - of the gabelle on salt
- corvées in service to both the lord and the king
- service in the militia created by Louis XIV

Among city dwellers were merchants and artisans who worked in their shops and workshops and belonged to a guild. Cities also housed many workers and domestics.

The term Third Estate became common only from the French Revolution of 1789. Although the peasant population made up 80% of the French population, there were no peasants in the assemblies, either during the Convocation of the Estates General on May 5, 1789 or throughout the rest of the Revolution. The Third Estate was almost exclusively represented by educated bourgeois holding judicial positions, trading and banking businesses, or financial offices. Elections to the Estates General were conducted by constituency, with one vote per family head (in 1789, elections to the Estates General saw massive participation from the population). The first assembly of 1791 was elected by censitary suffrage; the National Convention of 1792 was elected by universal suffrage.

What is the Third Estate? Everything. What has it been until now in the political order? Nothing. What does it demand? To be something.

— Emmanuel Joseph Sieyès

== Functioning of the Ancien Régime society ==
=== Organization ===
==== Authorities ====
===== Royalty =====
The king governed with the assistance of his Council. Gradually, from Philip the Fair and his son Philip the Long, the Council underwent a dual evolution. On one hand, it gave rise to more specialized bodies; on the other, great lords were sidelined in favor of more professional personnel. The positions of counselor were venal, but the king chose the holders of important functions.

The chancellor affixed the royal seal to acts: he represented eternal justice. The Controller-General of Finances managed revenues and expenditures. The role of the four secretaries of state (responsible for the navy, war, foreign affairs, and the king's household) evolved from that of clerk to that of minister.

Royal authority was applied in the provinces by 33 intendants in the generalities. The intendant was also a valuable source of information for the central power. He intervened in the distribution of the main direct tax, the taille. Thirteen courts of accounts were tasked with auditing the accounts of state agents and preserving royal patrimony.

Twelve courts of aids rendered final judgments in tax matters. The taille was collected, depending on the provinces, by officers holding their position, falsely called "elected," or by the states provincial, assemblies of notables.

The collection of indirect taxes was managed through the farming system: a group of financiers advanced the total sum to the king and then organized the tax collection themselves, for profit. The main indirect tax was the gabelle on salt.

===== Judicial system =====
Individuals and socio-economic groups had relationships regulated by centuries-old customs that formed private law. These customs varied by region: thus, the inheritance system differed between Normandy and Languedoc. They also differed by social group: the nobility and the third estate often had different rules for successions. However, the south of the kingdom was subject to the Code of Justinian, which perpetuated Roman law.

Ordinary justice was first administered by bailiwicks, then by presidials. Eighteen sovereign courts of justice, including fourteen parlements, judged in the final instance. The jurisdiction of the Parliament of Paris was the largest but covered only part of the territory: the historical core of the royal domain (Anjou, Auvergne, Berry, Champagne, Île-de-France, Orléanais, Picardy, Poitou, and Touraine), some of which were temporarily granted to apanage princes. Parliamentarians owned their positions, which they had purchased. Their integrity was often questioned, which did not prevent them from positioning themselves against royal power as defenders of public rights and freedoms.

==== Communities ====
===== Cities =====
The development of trade in the Middle Ages and the need to ensure city security during the Hundred Years' War favored the emergence of municipal authorities, the échevinages.

Large cities were primarily administrative centers, like Rouen, the historic capital of Normandy, attracting legal professionals. In this regard, the judicial map of modern France still reflects the urban influence zones of the Ancien Régime. Cities like Angers, Chambéry, Bourges, and Grenoble remain seats of courts of appeal whose jurisdictions correspond to the former provinces they administered, now vanished: Anjou, Savoy, Berry, and Dauphiné.

Large cities were also economic centers. Trades were organized in each city into guilds, which could be sworn communities (under oath) or regulated (subject to rules). Royal privileges were granted to them through letters patent. With the stated goal of ensuring the quality of productions and fair remuneration for members, each guild controlled access to the trade, which it also defended against perceived unfair competition. Guilds were abolished by the Allarde Decree of March 2 and 17 March 1791, confirmed by the Le Chapelier Law of 14 June 1791.

Some cities developed large-scale trade, such as Lyon at the confluence of the Saône and Rhône, La Rochelle on the Atlantic, or Marseille on the Mediterranean. Nantes and Bordeaux prospered through trade with the West Indies. Bordeaux's prosperity is evident in the city's new urbanism, preserved to this day. The Bordeaux bourgeoisie embraced Enlightenment philosophy, following Montesquieu and notably in Freemasonry. They actively participated in the French Revolution, giving their name to a political movement, the Girondins.

The development of rival cities, Nantes and Rennes in Brittany, Montpellier and Toulouse in Languedoc, led in the twentieth century to the creation of new regions around each of these cities, which became major metropolises.

===== Villages =====
Peasants, who made up the vast majority of the population, rarely dealt with royal authority. The priest announced official news and kept the civil registry. The lord dispensed justice. The assembly of main property owners distributed taxes and recruited the schoolmaster.

Regarding the collection of the taille, the village assembly appointed individuals each year to collect the tax owed by the community. This responsibility was dreaded, as those appointed risked not only making enemies during tax distribution but also having to advance unpaid sums, under the threat of sanctions up to imprisonment.

Laborers owned land, equipment to work it, and livestock. Landless workers rented their labor or practiced a craft. The main manufacturing activity at the time was textile production, often scattered in the countryside, organized by entrepreneurs who supplied raw materials upstream and handled finishing and marketing in cities downstream.

=== Dynamics ===
==== Mobilities and social relations ====
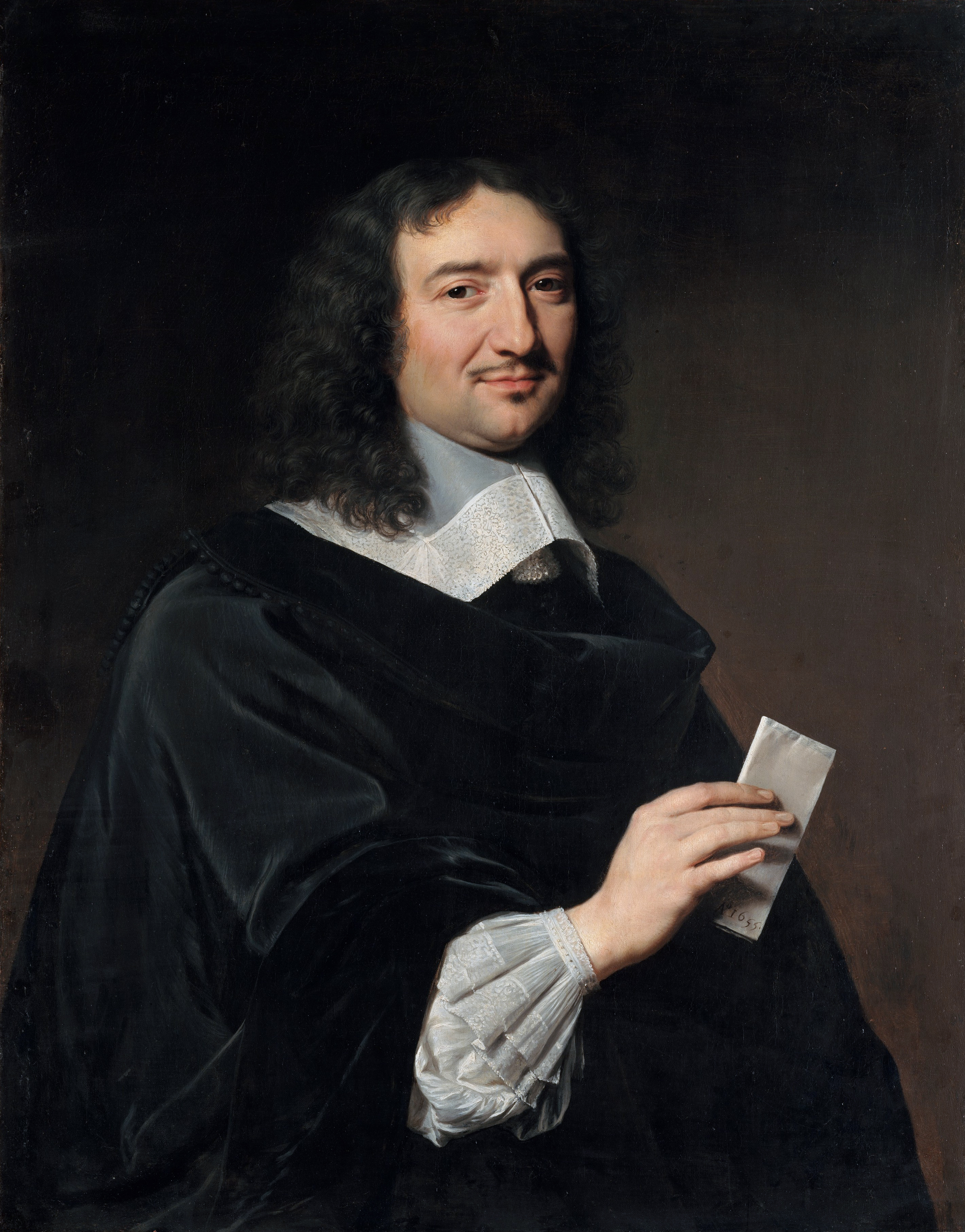
Jean-Baptiste Colbert, from the bourgeoisie, became a minister under Louis XIV and integrated his posterity into the nobility

The three orders of the Ancien Régime were not closed. The most modest layers of the population could enter the clergy and benefit from its privileges: the clergy was open to other orders, provided they had a vocation and adopted chastity. A fraction of laypeople showed anticlericalism, reproaching the Church for its obscurantism and the high clergy's ties with the nobility.

Bourgeois sought to emulate the nobility's lifestyle. Certain municipal positions allowed integration into the so-called "bell" nobility. By purchasing officer positions, offices, they rose to the rank of nobility of the robe. The cash-strapped king sold these positions for profit and, through the paulette mechanism, allowed the creation of officer dynasties that could escape his control. The position of secretary of the king was the most expensive but highly sought after. From the second half of the 18th century, military positions also allowed access to nobility. Parvenus of the "soap for commoners" were viewed unfavorably by the old nobility.

One could lose order privileges: nobles who deviated from their lifestyle were stripped of their prerogatives. It was not until the end of the Ancien Régime that they openly participated in industry and commerce.

Within each order, competition or even enmity existed: the high clergy from the nobility looked down on the low clergy from the third estate. The nobility formed a disunited body, split between reactionaries and liberals, great lords and minor barons. In cities, the bourgeoisie sought to subjugate the "proletariat".

A latent divergence of interests existed between rural peasantry and urban notables. Peasants paid most of the dues and taxes that ensured the income of prelates, lords, or bourgeois. They also provided cheap labor for textile entrepreneurs.

A better-fed population was more prone to political contestation. Feudal rights were less accepted by peasants, as lords no longer played their former protective role. Some lords sometimes fueled resentment by seeking to change customary practices, such as enclosing common lands.

==== Contestations ====
Under Louis XIV, illustrious writers criticized the society of orders through comedies or fables. The fables of Jean de La Fontaine, the satires of Nicolas Boileau, the characters of Jean de La Bruyère, and the plays of Molière denounced the system's flaws. Le Bourgeois gentilhomme mocks Monsieur Jourdain, who seeks to imitate the noble lifestyle.

Critical thought gained momentum by the end of the reign. Vauban notably conducted significant reflection on taxation

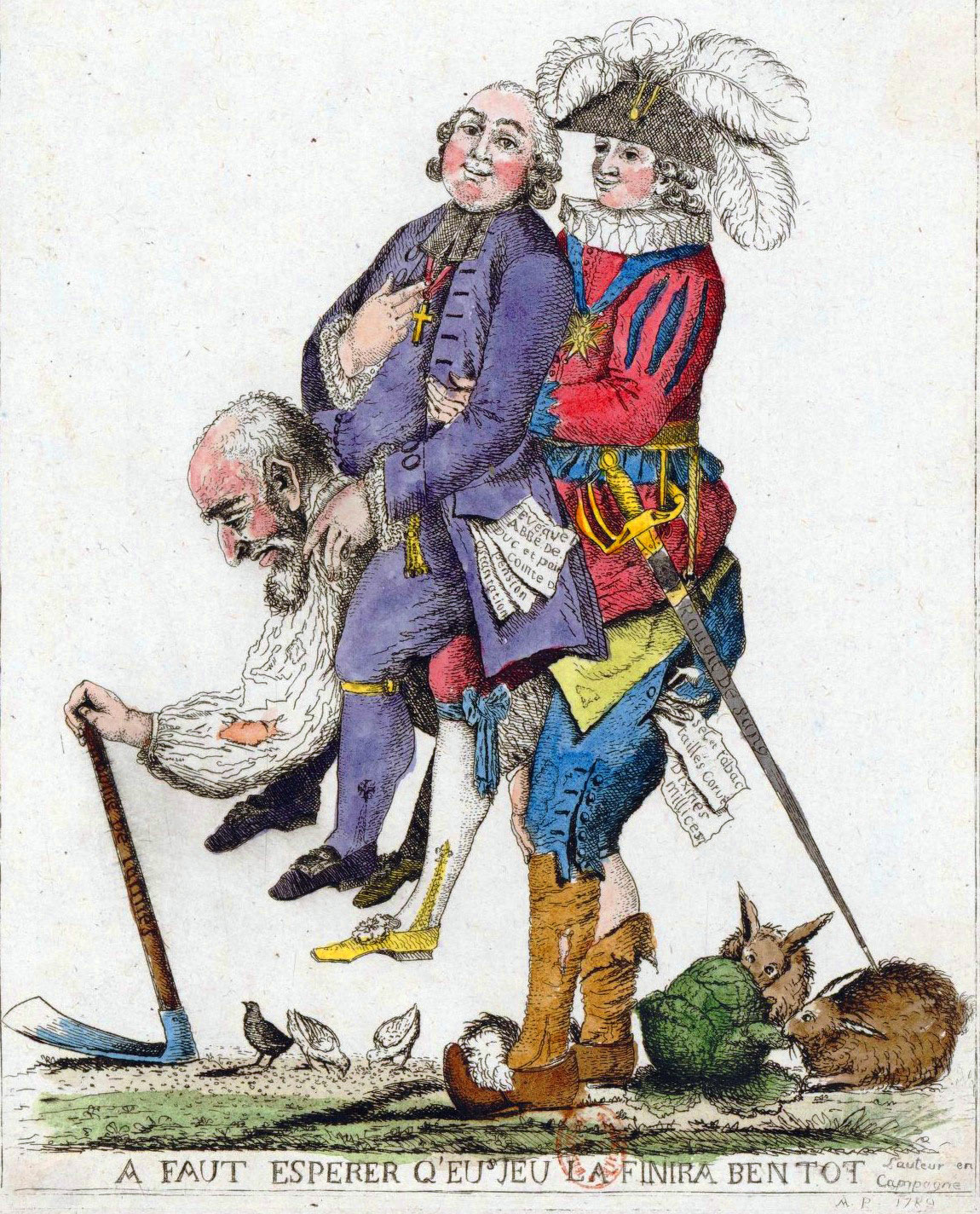
“Caricature of the three orders: a peasant, a noble, and a clergyman,” anonymous caricature, 1789

The Enlightenment philosophers criticized the legal and social inequalities under the Ancien Régime. The individual was at the center of their reflection, not the society of which they were merely a part. Society became the association of individuals. The social contract was made between all participants, that is, the entire set of citizens. Each person's freedom required equality, guaranteed by obedience to common laws. Each person's renunciation of exercising their right of the strongest allowed the establishment of the social contract, as everyone found the freedom to fulfill themselves

Jean-Jacques Rousseau was one of the philosophers who went furthest in this reflection, asserting the sovereignty of the people, called to decide the laws governing them.

==== Institutional blockages ====
The formalization of court life at Versailles through etiquette contributed to isolating the king's person. This phenomenon was particularly pronounced under Louis XV and Louis XVI: they had less political personalities and were less involved in public affairs than Louis XIV. As a result, a few privileged clans monopolized favors.

The monarchy's financial straits led it to sell public offices. Public officers were not necessarily the most competent. Their concern to recoup their initial investment encouraged corruption. Masters of their offices, they were not always obedient to royal power: parliaments even fostered a climate of contestation.

Faced with the aspirations of a bourgeoisie emboldened by economic development, sometimes even rapidly enriched by stock market speculations under Louis XV, the traditional nobility sought to preserve its privileges and maintain a monopoly on certain activities, notably military ones. This fueled resentment against it.

== See also ==
- Kingdom of France
- Social organization
- Feudalism

== Bibliography ==
- Durand, Yves (1984). "Vivre au pays au XVIIIe siècle" [Living in the Countryside in the 18th Century] (Digital). Cairn Info (in French): 1–8.
- Constable, Giles (1995). "The Orders of Society". Three Studies in Medieval Religious and Social Thought. Cambridge and New York: Cambridge University Press. pp. 249–360. ISBN 978-0-521-36483-6.
- Lousse, E. (1943). La société d'Ancien Régime, organisation et représentation corporatives [The Society of the Ancien Régime, Corporate Organization and Representation] (in French). Louvain: Université de Louvain.
- Mousnier, Roland (1969). Les Hiérarchies sociales de 1450 à nos jours [Social Hierarchies from 1450 to the Present] (in French). Paris: Presses Universitaires de France.
- Goubert, Pierre; Roche, Daniel (1989). Les Français et l'Ancien Régime [The French and the Ancien Régime] (in French). Paris: Colin.
- Beaurepaire, Pierre-Yves; Häseler, Jens; McKenna, Antony (2006). Réseaux de correspondance à l'âge classique (XVIe – XVIIIe siècle) [Correspondence Networks in the Classical Age (16th–18th Century)] (in French). Saint-Étienne: Université de Saint-Étienne. p. 382.
- Walch, Agnès (2020). La Vie sous l'Ancien Régime [Life under the Ancien Régime] (in French). Paris: Perrin.
