= Census (feudal tax) =

Feudal tax

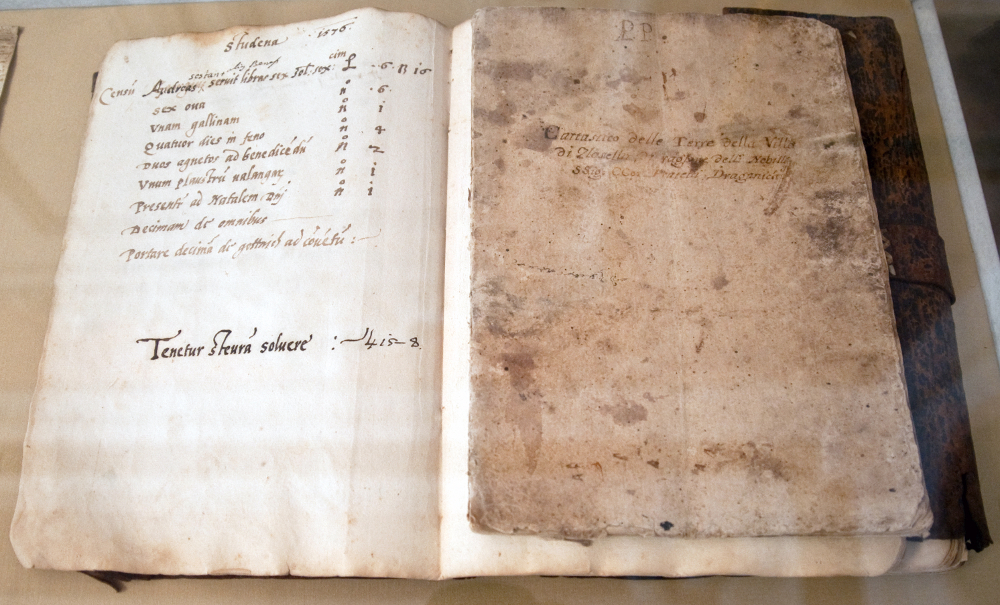
Land terrier (census book) from Rijeka, 1575. On this page, a list of fees in Latin (eggs, hens, days of hay...).

Census and censive are two terms related to the organization of the landed seigneury system, linked to the feudal system. The census is a fee (“payer le cens”), sometimes called “censive”; while censive was either a fee, or the land (often called tenure by historiography) on which the fee was levied (also known as “terre censale”), or the way of owning land (land held in censive, i.e. neither in fief nor in freehold).

== Definitions ==
Census was owed by the owner of a productive piece of land (usually a peasant) to the owner (the lord, who in modern times is not necessarily a noble). Both the payer and the receiver of the census can be referred to as “censier”.

If the peasant was a free man (villain), he paid nothing else to the lord. If he was a serf (common in the Middle Ages around the year 1000, less so in modern times), he needed to pay specific duties called chevage or chief census, mortmain (redemption of the right of transmission), etc.

Census should not be confused with tenant farming and sharecropping, which are contracts governed by private law, not seigneurial or feudal law. For example, the lord of a village received a census from the peasants cultivating the tenures. Still, he could also rent out land from the seigneurial reserve on a tenant or sharecropper basis, instead of having it cultivated by serfs or servants, thanks to the corvées imposed on the peasants who held the census.

In the case of fiefdom (or noble tenure), the link was established between a lord and his vassal. The vassal (at least a knight) owed the lord loyalty, military service, and several other vassal obligations.

In the case of allod, the land in question had no lord, which was quite rare. Indeed, the general idea behind customs in the north of the kingdom of France was: “No land without a lord”. In the south, partly governed by Roman law, the notion of land without a lord was legally acceptable.

== Census and censive as taxes ==
In the feudal era and under the Ancien Régime, the census was an annual and perpetual land tax owed by the owner of a useful piece of land, called a censive, to the owner of an eminent property, called a seignory. Paying census, the censitaire was generally a commoner, but could also be a noble or an ecclesiastic. The censive may consist of land, a built-up area in a town, a mill or a ferry on a river, a toll on a road, cattle with grazing rights, or a large estate such as a priory.

By paying the census, the censitaire symbolically acknowledged that he or she was subject to the land owner. By receiving the census, the direct lord confirmed his obligation to provide the tenant with just and peaceful possession. The agreement between the censitaire and the lord was the subject of an “acknowledgment” or “investiture” or “investition” (lat. investitio, derived from investio) when it was a commoner censive, but also sometimes a tribute when it was a noble domain.

A distinction is made between servile censives, which could not be sold or bequeathed, and free censives, which could be sold. The former are assumed to have originated from an allodial property that recommended itself to the protection of a lord, the latter are assumed to have been land granted by a lord to a dependent man or serf. The servile censive gave rise to a modest royalty but to far more important corvées.

Censives could be leased, either by the lord and converted into rent, or by the censitaire in accordance with local or town customs. Censives were land-related: even in towns, the concession covered only the bare land, with buildings and fixtures and fittings provided by the censitaire.

The value of the census was immutable, and non-negotiable between useful and direct owners: its amount, generally stipulated in kind, is assumed to have been fixed immemorially between the predecessors of the first censitaire and the first seigneur. When it was converted into money, the commoner censitaire had the option of paying it in kind.

The census should be considered as a royalty rather than a rent: it corresponded to the provision of justice and security that the seigneury (or sovereign town) must ensure for its inhabitants. It was therefore the feudal income and bond par excellence. Other levies, such as corvées, were used to cultivate and maintain the seigneurial reserve or roads; the reserve was the part of the estate used by the seigneur and was therefore not granted for census. The taille was a tax levied exceptionally by the seigneur; it became a regular tax owed to the king or the duke.

== The censive as censal land ==
A censive, or censal land, was a piece of land granted by a fief lord in exchange for the perpetual payment of a census. He ceded useful ownership (dominium utile), which could pass to his heirs, who in turn needed to jointly and severally continue to pay the census. The censitaire, the person who held the land under censorship (the tenure), was responsible for this land and the owner of its production. The seigneur censier, the person entitled to levy the census, retains the directicity, the eminent property (dominium directum). In principle, chiefage was not transferable. If it is transmitted, the serf must pay mortmain.

== Related concepts ==
=== Censiers ===
In the lexicon of the time, censier meant “one who receives or pays the census”. Thus, it is possible to speak of a seigneur censier or a fermier censier.

However, current historiographical usage normally distinguishes the censier (the one who receives) from the censitaire (the one who pays).

In some Oïl languages, censier means farmer. This is notably the case in Picard (cinsier) and Walloon (cinsî).

=== Surcensus ===
In modern times, when the census had become a rather low fee, the lords tried to increase it: this was known as surcensus, which could have been the cause of peasant revolts.

== Abolition during the French Revolution ==
All seigneurial and feudal rights were abolished during the French Revolution, either on August 4, 1789, by the National Constituent Assembly, or in 1793 by the National Convention.

In August 1789, the census was declared redeemable within 20 years in the name of respect for property rights, but the peasants refused this system, which was abolished a few years later by the much more radical assembly elected in 1792, which also abolished slavery in the colonies).

== See also ==
- Land terrier
- Feudalism
- Dominium directum et utile

== Bibliography ==
- Bertrand, Georges; Duby, Georges, eds. (1979). La formation des campagnes françaises: des origines au XIVe siècle [The formation of the French countryside: from its origins to the 14th century] (in French). Paris: Éd. du Seuil. ISBN 978-2-02-004267-3.
- Fossier, Robert (1978). Polyptyques et censiers [Polyptychs and censiers] (in French). Turnhout.
- Weiss, Valentine (2009). "Genèse des plans de censive parisiens de l'Ancien Régime et liens avec les documents de gestion domaniale médiévaux" [Genesis of the Parisian censive plans of the Ancien Régime and links with medieval estate management documents]. Bulletin de la Société de l'histoire de Paris et de l'Île-de-France. 2007-2008 (in French). 134–135: 71–93.
