= Land terrier =

Record of land holdings

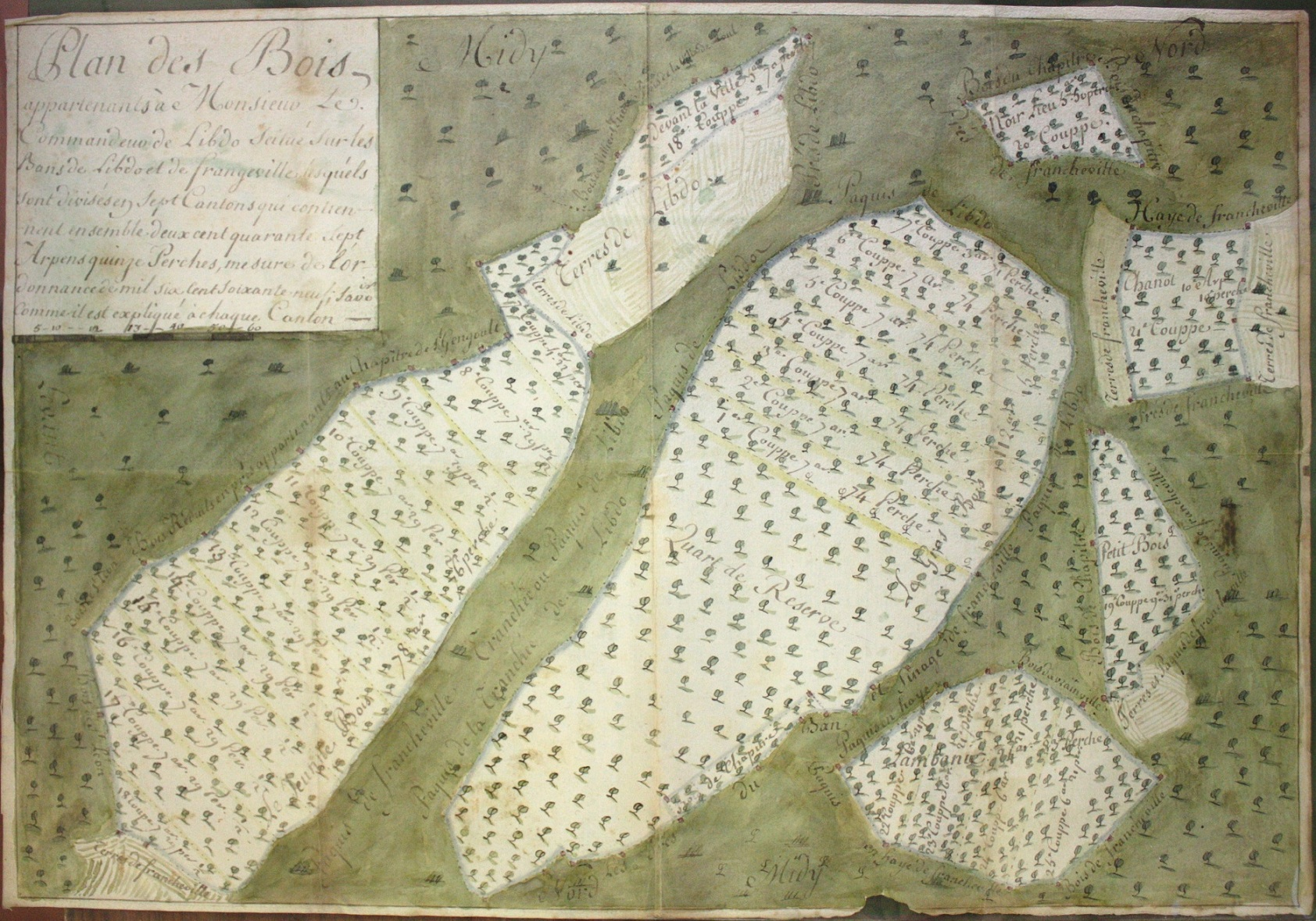
Land terrier of the Commandery of Libdeau in Lorraine, France

A land terrier is a record system for an institution's land and property holdings. It differs from a land register in that it is maintained for the organisation's own needs and may not be publicly accessible.

Typically, it consists of written records related to a map. Modern practice involves the use of Geographic Information Systems.

In France, the term "terrier" refers to feudal records associated with the Ancien Régime.

== See also ==
- Manorial roll
- Urbarium
- Census (feudal tax)
