= Urbarium =

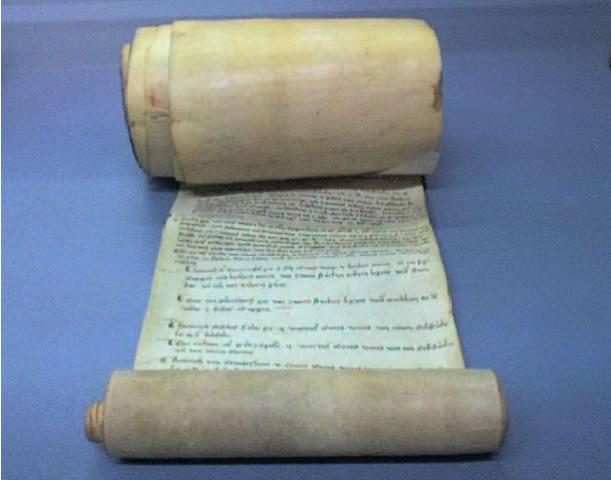
Scroll from Säckingen Abbey from 1310, written in Middle High German.

An urbarium (German: Urbar, English: urbarium, also rental or rent-roll, Czech: urbář, Polish: urbarz, Slovak: urbár, Hungarian: úrbér), is a register of fief ownership and includes the rights and benefits that the fief holder has over his serfs and peasants. It is an important economic and legal source of medieval and early modern feudalism.

Urbaria were also used to record land rent and stock. Depending on the region and writing materials for these lists they are also called Salbuch, Berain, Heberegister, Erdbuch (census book) Zins-Rödel or Rodel.

The term is from the Old High German ur-beran or the Middle High German erbern for "bring", "create" or "an income derived". It was used for economic, administrative or legal purposes as a directory of real estate, taxation, and the services owed a land holder (such as a monastery or noble) especially in the Habsburg lands. The panels of an urbarium, which may be recopied several times to create a clean copy, were either stored as a scroll (German: Rödel) or the strips of parchment were sewn together to create a codex, or were handwritten on preprinted forms in more recent centuries, as with Empress Maria Theresa's urbarial survey of the Kingdom of Hungary in the 18th century.

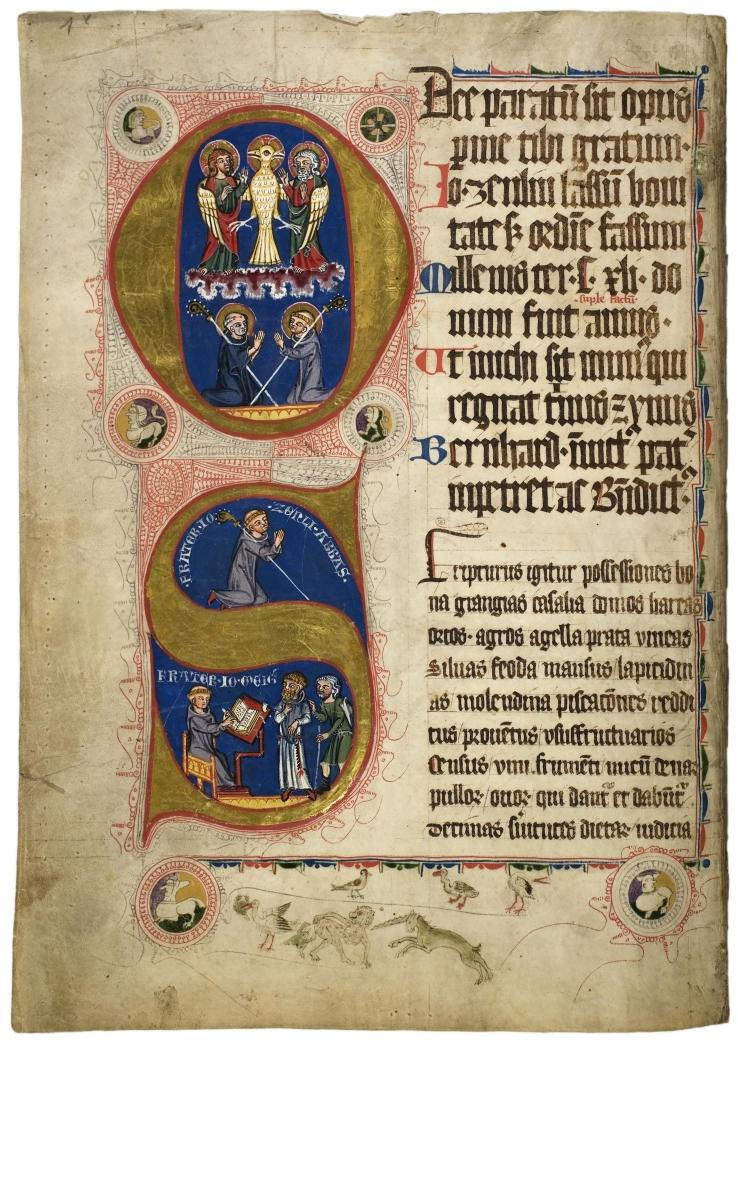
Title page of the Tennenbacher Güterbuch (in Latin) from 1317 to 1341

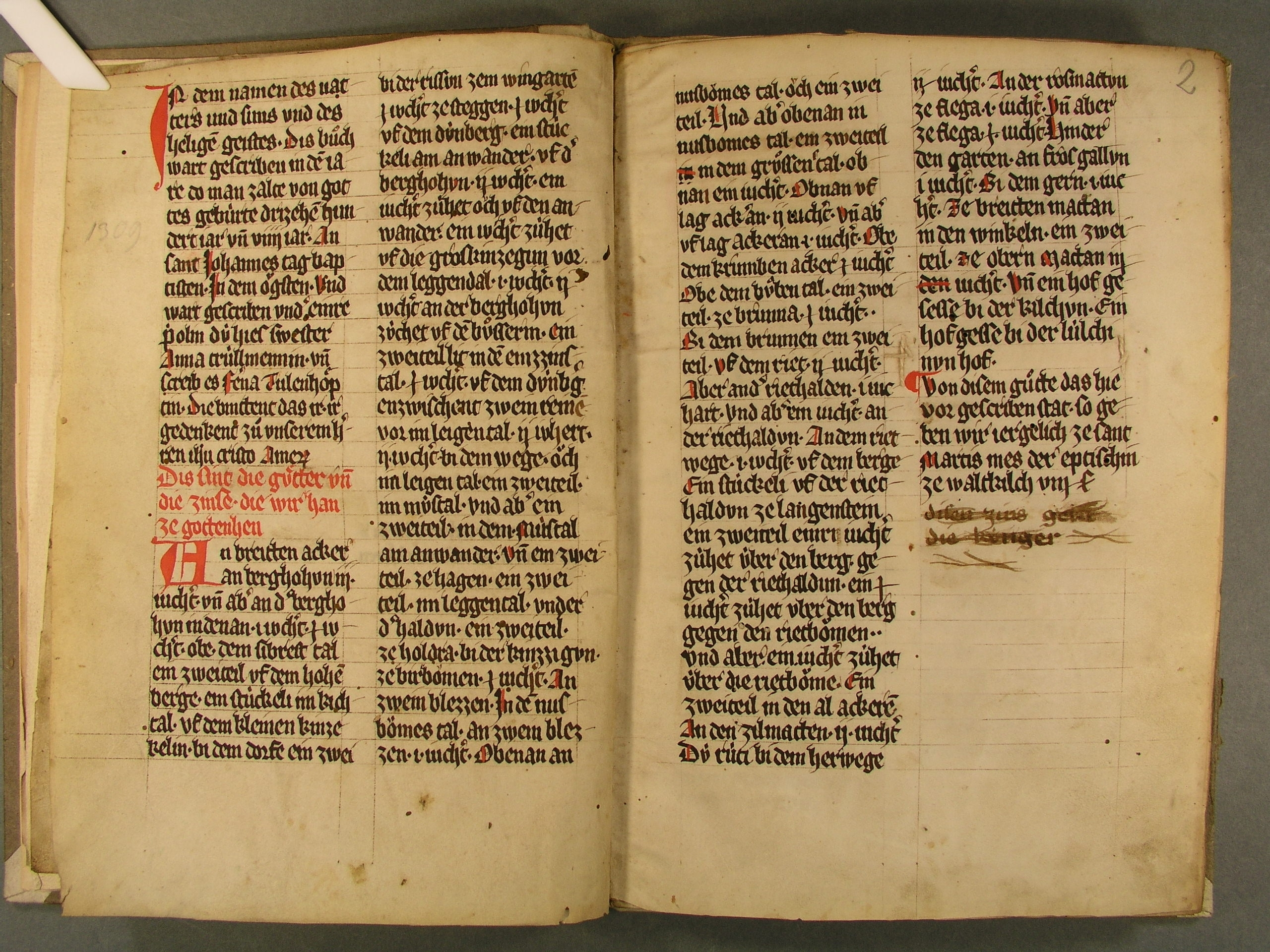
Urbarium codex from the Dominican Monastery of St Katharina in Freiburg, began in 1309, written in Middle High German

== See also ==
- Manorial roll
- Land terrier
