= John Day (historian) =

American historian (1924–2003)

- Born: 3 April 1924; Evanston, Illinois, U.S.
- Died: 17 February 2003 (aged 78); Paris, France
- Employer(s): Paris Diderot University; University of Cagliari

John Moulton Day (3 April 1924 – 17 February 2003) was an American historian.

== Biography ==
Born in Evanston, Illinois, in 1924, John Day taught at the Paris VII - Denis-Diderot University of Paris, in Israel, in the United States and at the University of Cagliari. During his work as an historian, he dealt in many of his studies with topics concerning economic history and used statistical methodologies, among others. Some of the themes he studied the most were monetary colonialism in the Mediterranean, the role of colonialism in the poverty of colonized peoples, and the history of Sardinia under foreign colonizers. His studies, in contrast to the previous idea of a "civilization" coming from outside, led him to consider Sardinia as one of the oldest colonies in the world, and to consider what was called its "immobility" as a consequence of such colonization.

i fattori determinanti del problema dell'arretratezza furono la linea politica e la pratica di governo adottate nell'isola dai proprietari stranieri. I meccanismi del commercio coloniale si combinarono con la continua esportazione degli introiti, con le tasse e con i tributi, deprivando la Sardegna dei suoi beni naturali e riducendo la massa della popolazione al più scarso livello di sussistenza

— Day, John (1990). "La Sardegna come laboratorio di storia coloniale". Quaderni Bolotanesi (in Italian). 16: 145.
Translation:

the determinants of the problem of backwardness were the government policy and the practice adopted on the island by the foreign masters. The mechanisms of colonial trade were combined with the continuous export of income, taxes and taxes, depriving Sardinia of its natural assets and reducing the mass of the population to the lowest level of subsistence.

tutti questi esempi tratti dalla storia sarda servono quindi a dimostrare la fallacia di modelli euro-centrici del processo storico in un paese dov’è in gioco non tanto il progresso quanto la sopravvivenza.
Sotto questo aspetto la Sardegna, una delle più vecchie dipendenze coloniali del mondo, non è stato certamente un caso isolato

— Day, John (1990). "La Sardegna come laboratorio di storia coloniale". Quaderni Bolotanesi (in Italian). 16: 145.
Translation:

all these examples taken from Sardinian history therefore serve to demonstrate the fallacy of Euro-centric models of the historical process in a country where not so much progress as survival is at stake.
In this respect, Sardinia, one of the oldest colonial dependencies in the world, was certainly not an isolated case

Furthermore, he was the author of one of the first censuses of the abandoned villages and villages of Sardinia. His research has made it possible to bring the European methodologies of the period, and especially the French ones, into Sardinian historiography.

== Publications ==
This is a partial list of John Day's publications:

- Day, John (1973). Villaggi abbandonati in Sardegna dal trecento al settecento: inventario (in Italian). Editions du Centre national de la recherche scientifique. OCLC 997388262.
- Day, John (1975). "Malthus démenti ? Sous-peuplement chronique et calamités démographiques en Sardaigne au bas Moyen Âge". Annales. Histoire, Sciences Sociales (in French). 30 (4). PERSEE: 684–702. doi:10.3406/ahess.1975.293640. OCLC 754262444. S2CID 162335379.
- Day, John (1976). "Villaggi abbandonati e tradizione orale: il caso sardo". Archeologia Medievale (in Italian). 3: 203–239.
- Day, John (1982). "Alle origini della povertà rurale". In Giulio Angioni e Francesco Manconi (ed.). Le opere e i giorni. Pastori e contadini nella Sardegna tradizionale (in Italian). Milanu: Silvana. ISBN 978-8836600120.
- John Day, Europa dal '400 al '600: fonti e problemi, Atti del convegno internazionale (in Italian), Milan, 1983, pp. 241–249.
- Day, John (1984). "La Sardegna ei suoi dominatori dal secolo XI al secolo XIV". La Sardegna Medievale e Moderna (in Italian). UTET: 3–187.
- Day, John (1984). "La restructuration démographique de la Sardaigne aux XIVe-XVe siècles". In Rinaldo Comba, Gabriella Piccinni e Giuliano Pinto (ed.). Strutture familiari, epidemie, migrazioni nell'Italia medievale (in French). Naples: Scientifiche Italiane. OCLC 636733545.
- Day, John; Anatra, Bruno; Scaraffia, Lucetta (1984). La Sardegna medioevale e moderna (in Italian). UTET. ISBN 978-88-02-03906-0. OCLC 230824134.
- Day, John (1984). L'economia della Sardegna Catalana (in Italian). OCLC 1007526751.
- Day, John (1984). "Castelli, città fortificate e organizzazione del territorio in Sardegna dal secolo dodicesimo al quattordicesimo". In Rinaldo Comba e Aldo A. Settia (ed.). Castelli, storia e archeologia: relazioni e comunicazioni al Convegno tenuto a Cuneo il 6-8 dicembre, 1981 (in Italian). Turingraf. pp. 115–121.
- Day, John (1986). "La condizione femminile nella Sardegna Medievale". Famiglia e la Vita Quotidiana in Europa Dal '400 al '600: Fonti e Problemi: Atti del Convegno Internazionale, Milano, 1-4 Dicembre 1983 (in Italian).
- Day, John (1986). "Quanti erano i Sardi nei secoli XIV-XV?,«". Archivio Storico Sardo (in Italian). 35: 51–60.
- Day, John; Calia, Itria (1987). Uomini e terre nella Sardegna coloniale: XII-XVIII secolo (in Italian). CELID. ISBN 978-88-7661-142-1. OCLC 25666789.
- Day, John (1987). La Sardegna sotto la dominazione pisano-genovese: dal secolo XI al secolo XIV (in Italian). Utet Libreria. ISBN 978-88-7750-175-2. OCLC 906600509.
- Day, John (1990). "La Sardegna come laboratorio di storia coloniale". Quaderni Bolotanesi (in Italian). 16: 143–148.
- Day, John (1993). Atlas de la Sardaigne rurale aux 17e et 18e siècles (in French). Editions de l'Ecole des hautes études en sciences sociales. ISBN 978-2-7132-1001-3. OCLC 797788518.
