= Feudal maintenance =

Money payment to soldiers who fought in the interest and at the command of their lord

Feudal maintenance under feudal systems of government, was the money payment to soldiers who fought in the interest and at the command of their lord. Such soldiers comprised private armies, each with uniquely identifiable livery. The system of feudal government under which maintenance was paid was most notably present in Europe during the late 15th century.
