= Amober =

Formerly in Welsh law, an amober, or amobyr, was a maiden-fee paid to a lord on the marriage of a maiden in his manor. The term is similar to the English feudal merchet.
