= José Martí y Monsó =

Spanish painter (1840–1912)

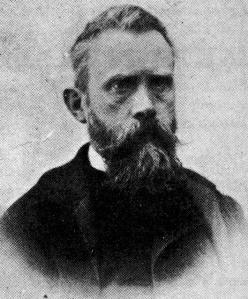
José Martí y Monsó (late 1890s)

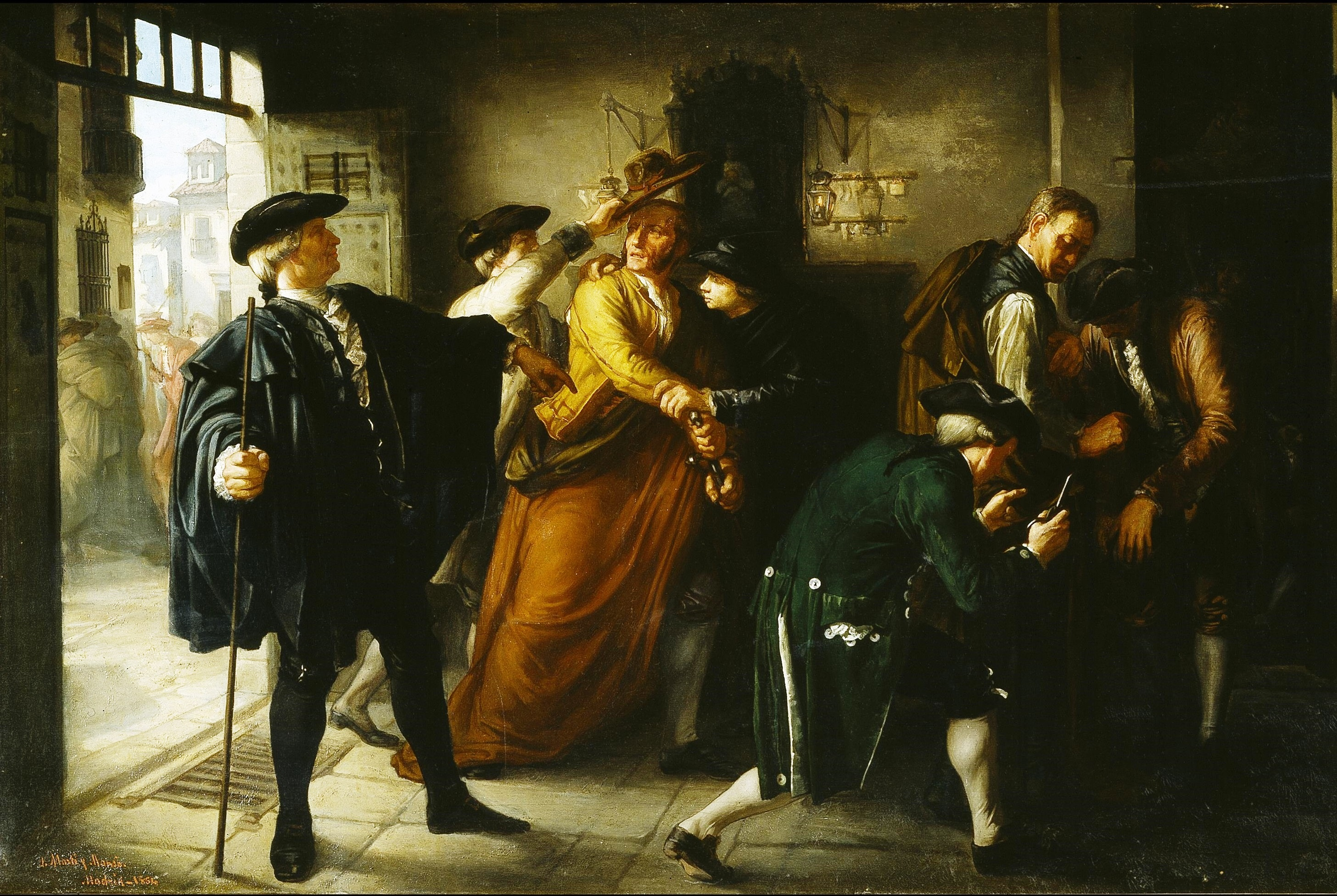
Scene from the Esquilache Riots, showing demonstrators being outfitted as "Hats-and-Capes"

José Martí y Monsó (4 January 1840, Valencia - 14 December 1912, Valladolid) was a Spanish painter, art professor, researcher and museum official. He was considered an expert on Castilian art and the history of Holy Week in Valladolid.

== Biography ==
He moved to Madrid at an early age and enrolled at the Real Academia de Bellas Artes de San Fernando, where his instructors were Luis Ferrant and Federico de Madrazo. While there, he also took private lessons in the studios of Antonio Gómez Cros. After 1860, he was a regular participant in the National Exhibition of Fine Arts. In 1864, he won honorable mention for his depiction of an episode from the Esquilache Riots, followed by a third class medal in 1866 for his work "The Grape Harvest".

After 1873, he combined his work as an artist with the role of professor when he became Director of the "Escuela de Artes y Oficios de Valladolid". He was also chosen to be curator of the art collection at the Museo de Valladolid and, the following year, took over as Director of the Museo Provincial de Bellas Artes; a position he held until his death. In 1900, he was elected a member of the "Real Academia de Bellas Artes de la Purísima Concepción".

He was also the author of Catálogo provisional del Museo de Pintura y Escultura de Valladolid (1874) and Estudios histórico-artísticos relativos a Valladolid (1898-1901). In addition, he was a contributor to Castilla artística e histórica, a bulletin from the "Sociedad Castellana de Excursiones", established by Narciso Alonso Cortés in 1903. A plaza in Valladolid has been named in his honor.
