= Manorial roll =

Record of the activities of a manorial court in England

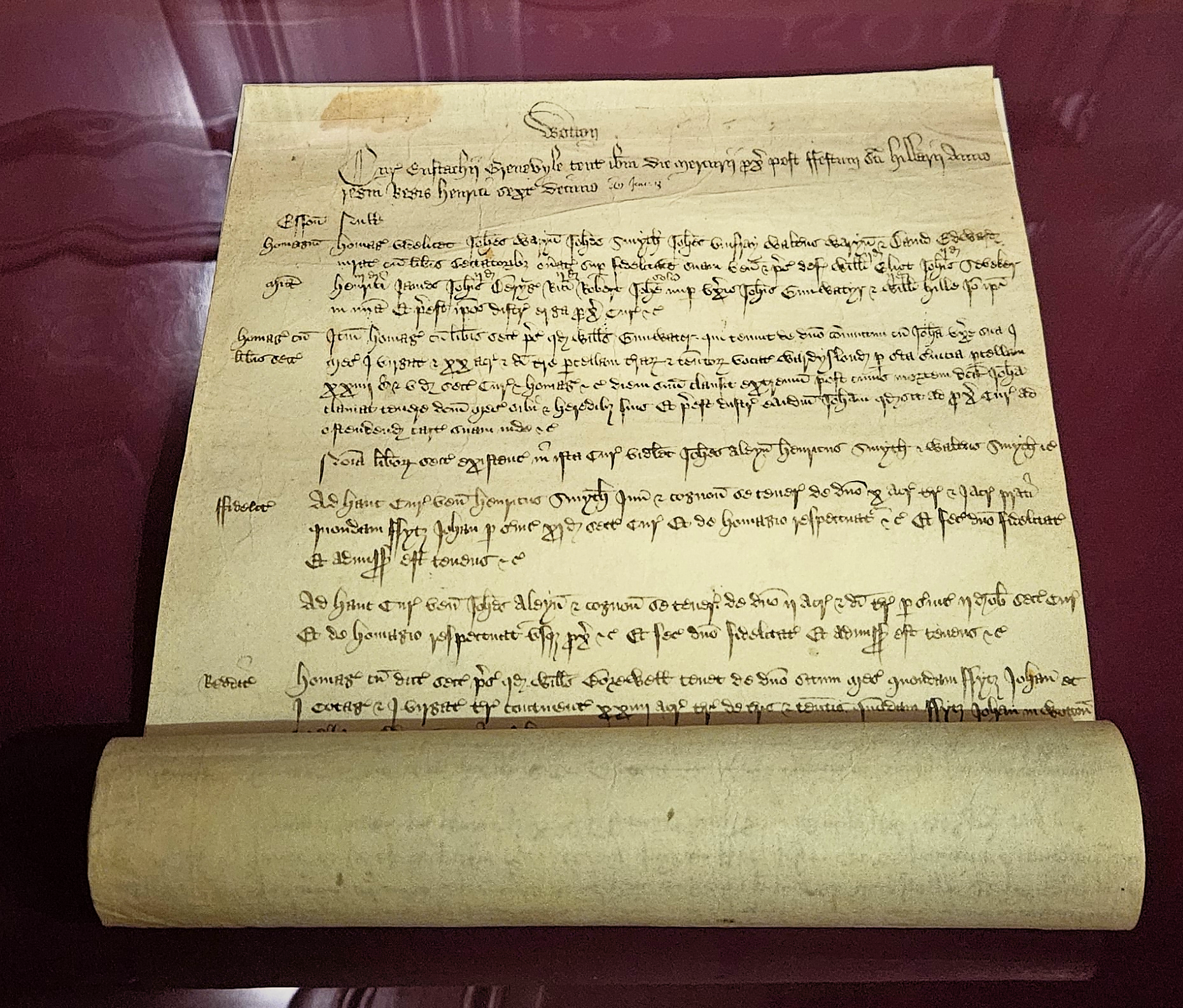
Court roll for the court of Eustace Grenville in Wotton Underwood, Buckinghamshire, 1432

A manorial roll or court roll is the roll or record kept of the activities of a manorial court, in particular containing entries relating to the rents and holdings, deaths, alienations, and successions of the customary tenants or copyholders. The records were invariably kept in roll form in the Middle Ages, but in the post-medieval period were more usually entered into volumes. Despite this change of format, the records often continued to be known as court rolls, although the term court books is also found.

The rolls record the meetings of the manorial court, either court leet or court baron, or views of frankpledge. Entries usually began with the date; a list of jurors (selected from the manor); and apologies and/or fines for those manorial tenants unable to attend the court. General matters, such as a failure to maintain highways or gates, are followed by specific items such as the death and inheritance of a tenant since the last court, and any surrenders of land, forfeits, or licences to let. Where land changed hands between customary tenants, a copy of the relevant entry in the court roll constituted the tenant's evidence of title to his holding, and this form of land tenure therefore became known as copyhold.

== See also ==
- Urbarium
- Land terrier
