= Villein =

Type of social status in medieval Europe

A villein is a class of serf tied to the land under the feudal system. As part of the contract with the lord of the manor, they were expected to spend some of their time working on the lord's fields in return for land. Villeins existed under a number of legal restrictions that differentiated them from freemen and could not leave without their lord's permission. Generally, villeins held their status not by birth but by the land they held, and it was also possible for them to gain manumission from their lords. The villeinage system largely died out in England in 1500, with some forms of villeinage being in use in France until 1789.

== Etymology ==
Villein is derived from Late Latin villanus, meaning a man employed at a Roman villa rustica, or large agricultural estate. The system of tied serfdom originates from a decree issued by the late Roman Emperor Diocletian (r. 284–305 CE) in an attempt to prevent the flight of peasants from the land and the consequent decline in food production. The decree obliged peasants to register in their locality and never leave it.

Because of the low social status of villeins, the term became derogatory. In modern French vilain means "ugly" or "naughty". In Italian, Villano means "rude" or "ill-mannered". For the Spanish Villano, the RAE preserves the definition of "neighbour or inhabitant of a village or town", but it also accepts the derogatory use, which is very similar to the Modern English villain.

== Villeinage ==
Villeinage, as opposed to other forms of serfdom, was most common in Western European feudalism, where land ownership had developed from roots in Roman law. A variety of kinds of villeinage existed in Western Europe and it is impossible to arrive at a precise definition which satisfies them all. Different times and countries dealt with villeinage in slightly different ways. Some villeins had clearly defined and limited responsibilities to their lords, while others were essentially at their lords' whim.

As part of the contract with their landlord, villeins were expected to pay dues and services in exchange for land. They were bound to serve their lords and only had one or two acres of land to use. Villeins were tied to the land and could not move away without their lord's consent.

If an unfree villein allowed his daughter into a marriage with a man from another manor, a fine must be paid to the lord as a fee for the loss of future villeins that could have been borne by the woman.

Villeins typically had to pay special taxes and fines that freemen were exempt from, for example, the "filstingpound" (an assurance against corporal punishment) and a "leyrwite" (fine for bearing a child outside of wedlock). The merchet fine was very often used against a villein's petition for freedom, since paying it proved a villein status. However, except to their own lords, they were free men in the eyes of the law. Villeins were generally able to have their own property, unlike slaves.

Villeinage was not always an involuntary arrangement. In the Early Middle Ages, families entered villeinage voluntarily to guarantee land tenure. And while villeins were heavily restricted in what they could do, it was also possible for them to gain manumission. Many villeins were in villeinage because of the land they held, rather than by birth. They could become free men if their lord agreed with them to move them to a different holding.

Villeinage was not a purely exploitative relationship. In the Middle Ages, land guaranteed sustenance and survival; being a villein guaranteed access to land. Landlords rarely evicted villeins, because of the value of their labour. Villeinage was much preferable to being a landless labourer (such as a cotter) or a vagabond. However, during the High Middle Ages, villeins could be willingly sold by their lords who could allow their families to be split up.

Villeinage became progressively less common through the Middle Ages, particularly after the Black Death had reduced the rural population and the bargaining power of workers had improved. Furthermore, the lords of many manors were willing (for payment) to manumit their villeins. It had largely died out in England by 1500 as a personal status, but land held by villein tenure (unless enfranchised) continued to be held by what was henceforth known as a copyhold tenancy, which was not abolished until 1925. Villeinage continued in France until the revolution in 1789.

== See also ==
- History of English land law
- Croft
- Kholop
