= David Rollison =

Australian social historian

David Peter Rollison (1945‍–‍2025) was a social historian of early modern Britain, with a particular focus on Gloucestershire. He worked at the University of New South Wales and the University of Western Sydney from 1975 to 2007, teaching politics and history, after which he was an honorary research associate at the University of Sydney.

== Selected works ==
- The local origins of modern society: Gloucestershire 1500-1800. Routledge. 1992. ISBN 0-415-07000-7.
- A commonwealth of the people: popular politics and England's long social revolution, 1066-1649. Cambridge University Press. 2010. ISBN 978-0-521-85373-6. Full access available to users of The Wikipedia Library.
- Commune, country and commonwealth: the people of Cirencester, 1117-1643. The Boydell Press. 2011. ISBN 978-1-84383-671-1. Full access available to users of The Wikipedia Library.
