= Chiefage =

English feudal tribute

A chiefage, or chevage, according to Henry de Bracton, was a tribute by the head; or a kind of poll-money paid by those who held lands in villeinage, or otherwise, to their lords, in acknowledgement.

The word seems also to have been used for a sum of money annually given to a man of power, for his patronage and protection, as to their chief.

In the first sense, Edward Coke observed, there was still a kind of chevage subsisting in Wales during his time, called amabyr; paid to the Prince of Wales for the marriage of his daughters; anciently by all, and in Coke's time, only by some.

William Lambarde wrote it chivage. Jewish people, when allowed to live in England, paid chevage, or poll-money; viz. three pence per person, paid at Easter.

The word is formed from the French chef, head.

== See also ==
- John and William Merfold
- Jack Cade
- Peasants' Revolt
