= Merchet =

Fine paid on a marriage during the Middle Ages in England

Merchet (also: -ett, -ete, -eit, -eat, -iett, -i(e)te, -iatte, mershet(e), marchet, -eit, market) (/ˈmərtʃət/) was a fine paid on a marriage during the Middle Ages in England. The word derives from the Welsh plural form of daughter, merched. Merchet was payment to a peasant's lord, whether by the persons marrying, or by a father for his son or daughter, or by a brother for his sister. There are also records of young Medieval women working in service away from home having saved money to pay a merchet fee for the right to choose their marriage partner. Theories regarding the practice include recompense for the loss of a worker. The etymology of the term may be sought not in the root of any word having reference to maids or daughters in particular, but in the root of an unknown word having reference to blood, to purchase, to redemption or enfranchisement, or the price paid for it, or to a particular kind of tax, fine, impost, or exaction.

== See also ==
- Mercheta Mulierum, custom on Scottish island of Ulva
