= Feudalism in the Holy Roman Empire =

Medieval political and economic system in the Holy Roman Empire

Feudalism formed the basis of the social structure within the Holy Roman Empire during the High Middle Ages. In Germany the system is variously referred to Lehnswesen, Feudalwesen or Benefizialwesen.

Feudalism in Europe emerged in the Early Middle Ages, based on Roman clientship and the Germanic social hierarchy of lords and retainers. It obliged the feudatory to render personal services to the lord. These included e.g. holding his stirrup, joining him on festive occasions and service as a cupbearer at the banquet table. Both pledged mutual loyalty: the lord to "shelter and protect", the vassal to "help and advise". Furthermore, feudal lord and vassal were bound to mutually respect one another, e.g. the lord could not, by law, beat his vassal, humiliate or lay hands on his wife or daughter.

The highest liege lord was the sovereign, the king or duke, who granted fiefs to his princes. In turn, they could award fiefs to other nobles, who wanted to be enfeoffed by them and who were often subordinate to the liege lord in the aristocratic hierarchy.

== Terms ==
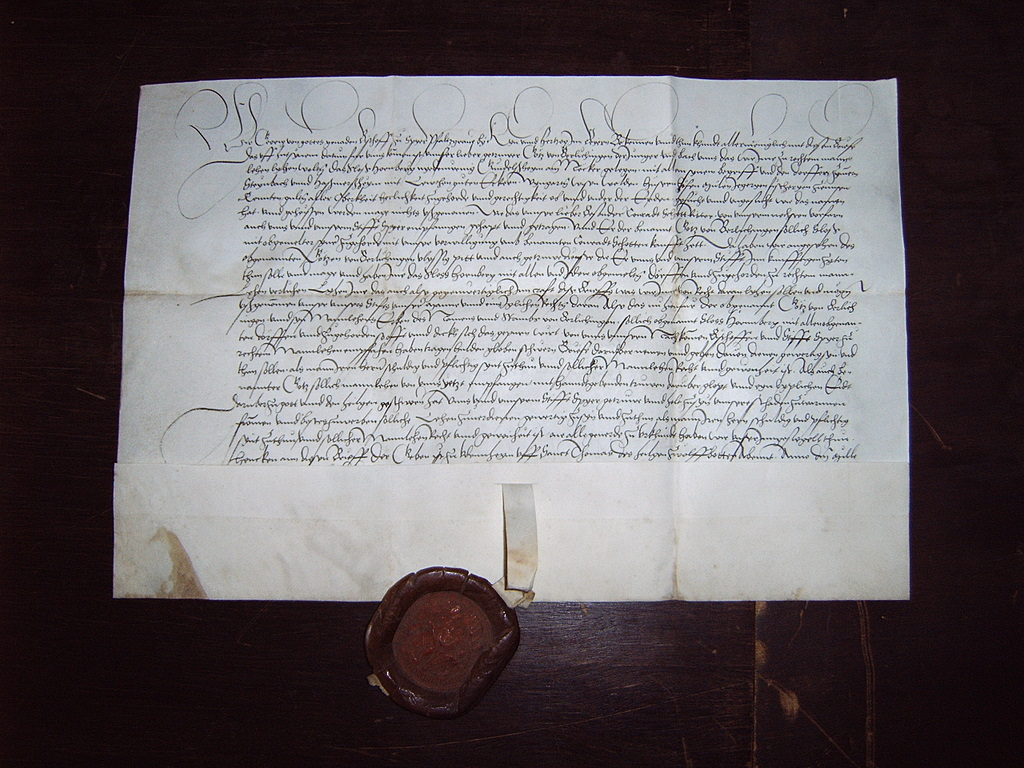
Götz von Berlichingen was enfeoffed with Hornberg Castle in this deed

A fief (also fee, feu, feud, tenure or fiefdom, German: Lehen, Latin: feudum, feodum or beneficium) was understood to be a thing (land, property), which its owner, the liege lord (Lehnsherr), had transferred to the hereditary ownership of the beneficiary on the basis of mutual loyalty, with the proviso that it would return to the lord under certain circumstances.

Enfeoffment gave the vassal extensive, hereditary usufruct of the fief, founded and maintained on a relationship of mutual loyalty between the lord and the beneficiary. The Latin term "beneficum" encompassed not only the tangible estate or property, commonly referred to as the fief or "feodum" in Latin, but also encompassed the related legal relationship.

The owner was the so-called liege lord or feudal lord (German: Lehnsherr Lehnsgeber; Latin: dominus feudi, senior), who was usually the territorial lord or reigning monarch. The beneficiary was his vassal, liegeman or feudatory (German: Vasall, Lehnsmann, Knecht, Lehenempfänger or Lehensträger; Latin: vassus or vasallus). Both parties swore an oath of fealty (Lehnseid) to one another. The rights conferred on the vassal were so similar to actual possession that it was described as beneficial ownership (dominium utile), whereas the rights of the lord were referred to as direct ownership (dominium directum).

The fief (German: Lehen or Lehnsgut) usually comprised an estate or a complex of estates, but also specified rights of use and rights of taxation or duties.

Linguistically the term Lehen is connected with the word leihen, to lend or loan, and meant something like "loaned property" (cf. the modern German Darlehen, a loan), whilst the word feudum, which some etymologists suggest comes from the Latin fides (loyalty), is more likely to be derived from the Old High German fihu, fehu (whence modern Vieh), originally "cattle", but later generally "chattel".

The opposite of a fief was the freehold, allod or allodium, which roughly corresponds to the present freehold estate.

An institution during the transition from feudal states to what is now the free ownership of property, was the allodifizierte Lehen ("allodified fief"), a fief in which the feudal lord gave up direct ownership - usually in return for the payment of compensation or an allodified rent (Allodifikationsrenten) - but the vassal's ownership of the fief with an agreed agnatic succession - resembling a family entailed estate (Familienfideikommiß) - remained in place.

=== Types ===
There were numerous different types of feudal arrangement depending on regional tradition and the nature of feudal lordship (secular or ecclesiastical/monastic). The best-known of these were:

- Afterlehen: A subfief whereby the vassal awarded a part of his fief to a third party (subinfeudation)
- Altarlehen: A medieval proto-foundation (proto-Stiftung). Its purpose was to allocate annual revenue from the property to a specific primate for his abbey or church
- Beutellehen: originally a Ritterlehen that was later rented to farmers
- Burglehn: a fief in payment for services as a castellan (Burgmann)
- Erblehen: a fee tail (entail) where the heirs of the vassal automatically inherited his rights and duties. The fief only first became hereditary through the granting of a deed of entail (Erbrechtsbrief) from the liege lord
- Fahnlehen: ("banner fief") a fief to a secular prince, in which banners symbolised the fief and the duties to the Heerbann.
- Falllehen: a fief that expired on the death of the vassal. See Schupflehen
- Freistift: a fief that could be cancelled at 12 months notice
- Handlehen: a fief awarded for a specified period or the life of the vassal. Originally: a fief sealed by a handshake instead of a formal oath of fealty.
- Kunkellehen: a fief to a vassal who was a woman (also called a Weiberlehen or feudum femininum)
- Mannlehen/Mannslehen: a fief to a vassal who had to be a man
- ligisches Lehnswesen: a fief in which the vassal was excluded from holding fiefs from other lords through a stronger contract between lord and vassal
- Schildlehen: similar to Fahnenlehen, but where the vassal held the rank of count or lower
- Schupflehen: a fief that expired on the death of the vassal. His heirs were figuratively seen as "pushed" (Old German/Alemannic geschupft) out of the contract
- Stiftslehen: the fief was granted by an abbey, also called a Klosterlehen
- Weiberlehen: see Kunkellehen
- Zepterlehen: a fief to an ecclesiastical prince

== Feudal system ==
The king gave estates or appointments (Ämter) to upper or crown vassals (Kronvasallen), who, in turn, passed them on to lower vassals (Untervasallen). The lower vassals would then hire the land to be cultivated by unfree farmers. There were no feudal relationships between farmers and the lower vassals.

During the Middle Ages another structure developed in Germany, the so-called Heerschildordnung, a medieval feudal hierarchy:

- King (König)
- Ecclesiastical princes (Geistliche Fürsten)
- Secular, or lay, princes (Weltliche Fürsten)
- Counts and barons (Grafen und Freiherren)
- Ministeriales (Ministerialen or Dienstmannen)
- Vassals of the ministeriales (Männer der Ministerialen)
- Free knights (Ritterbürtige Mannen) (who could only receive a fief, not grant one)

Initially, only those of knightly birth were entitled to be enfeoffed, i.e. free knights who could bear arms and were in full possession of their title. Later, unfree ministeriales also rose to the knighthood. Vassalage consisted mainly of military campaigns (military service) and court duty (the presence of vassals at the court in order to offer advice). From court service, the state and imperial diets emerged. The fief was only given to the vassal to utilize; later, the vassal also became a sub-owner, but the feudal lord always retained the rights to this office. Eventually, the heritability of fiefs evolved later, but the landowner nevertheless remained the liege lord.

== Roots of feudalism ==
=== Roman patronage ===
In Late Antiquity, out of the Roman system of patronage (or clientage) and the clan (Sippe) relationships of the Migration Period (Völkerwanderungszeit) (Germanic kingdoms on Roman soil), relations between rulers and their subjects developed into a prevailing consensus that was commonplace and accepted.

In Roman culture, it was common for a patron (a wealthy Roman citizen) to automatically retain his freed slaves in a dependent relationship, known as patronage. In some cases, populations of conquered areas would become clients of the general who conquered the area. This required the client to accompany his patron to war and protect him if the latter so wished, to accompany him to court as a vocal supporter and, if the patron held public office, to act as his assistant and to accompany him on representational events in public.

In return, the patron had to ensure the legal and practical support of his client in all aspects of life. A Roman citizen, a non-Roman and even entire tribes in the Roman Empire could have a patron-client relationship.

In Late Antiquity, this form of relationship was increasingly adopted in rural areas, because the Roman nomenklatura increasingly saw their vast estates (Latifundia) as their refuge and also as economically important pillars, over which they sometimes even had their own jurisdiction and fortified prisons.

Clients at that time were usually bound to their patrons through the allocation of land.

=== Germanic clan system ===
During the latter years of the period of clan society with Germanic kingdoms on Roman soil, it was common for all the land to belong to the king. Only he could distribute land to his subjects. These subjects were usually family members, warriors who had performed outstanding feats, and noblemen. This land did not become the property of the subject, but was handed over to him only in persona. On the death of king or vassal, the land was de facto returned to the new king. Over time, a practice developed that the person enfeoffed with the land, together with his family, became the beneficiaries of the fief and remained permanently bound to it. Upon the death of one party, a new act of homage (Lehnseid), a formal legal ceremony, had to take place. These transitions were fluid and there were exceptions to the practice of enfeoffment.

The vassal often enfeoffed the estate, usually divided into smaller parcels of land, to other lesser vassals, who in turn had to swear fealty to him. In return for the lease of land, the king could demand loyalty and allegiance from the vassal and his sub-vassals. This means that, in the event of war, they had to provide soldiers and assistance, or if money ran short or a ransom was needed, they were expected to support the king.

The Roman patron-client relationship and the early clan-based feudal relationship in the Germanic kingdoms merged during the early Middle Ages into the feudal law, or Lehnsrecht, a legal and social set of relationships, which effectively formed a pyramid with the king at the top.

The enforcement of Lehnsrecht is associated with the reduced circulation of money in the Late Antiquity and Early Medieval periods. Money could not bind a vassal to a king, only land. Unlike money, this was plentiful.

Even kings (see Richard the Lionheart - compulsory allegiance) and at least in the early Middle Ages, the clergy (see Ottonian-Salian Imperial church system) could be vassals of a king or another king.

=== Emergence of feudal relationships ===
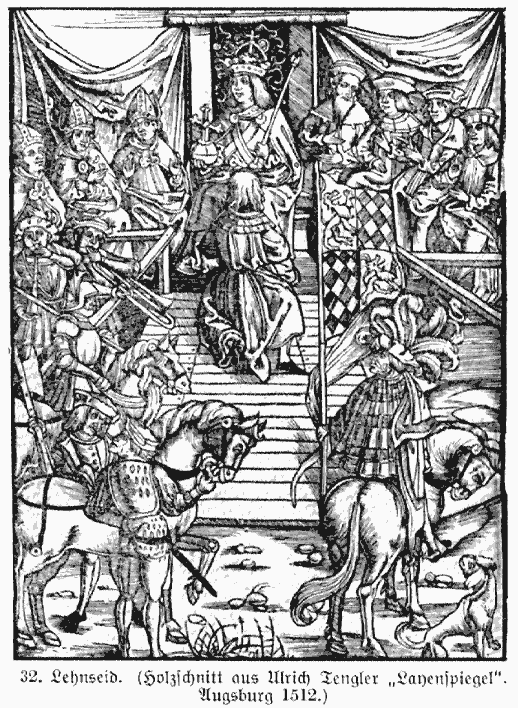
Acceptain of the oath of fealty (Lehnseid) in 1512

Under the feudal system, various legal institutions came together during the Carolingian period that had previously existed independently. These institutions were:

- The antrustiones - these were the inner circle of the king's retinue; they were distinguished by the fact that a multiple of the usual weregild had to be paid to them.
- The vassi - free lords who could no longer look after for themselves were able to commend themselves into the hands of a more powerful lord, receiving sustenance and shelter in return for an obligation of loyalty and service. They did not lose their status as free lords through the commendation ceremony, but the royal court continued to be responsible for them. The commendation was enacted by the so-called handgang ceremony, i.e. the future vassus put his hands, folded, into the hands of his lord, who then enclosed them. This gesture made the relationship of the two very clear.
- The beneficium (original meaning of "benefit") - in the early Middle Ages land was leased, but there were also cases where estates were granted without requiring recompense, for example under duress or to do someone a favour. The lord then remained the true owner of the land, but was no longer its beneficiary.

It was from the combination of these institutions, especially as more and more lords achieved high social position, that the feudal system emerged. The handgang, which together with the oath of loyalty (Treueid), became referred to as homagium (Latin), homage (French), or mannschaft (German), became the decisive legal device until well into the 12th century. Not until the spread of the system of legal deeds was the handgang dropped from the oath of allegiance, which was better recorded in writing.

Commendations were still carried out at all levels. In lower classes they were based on the manorial system (Grundherrschaft), at the high levels on feudalism (Lehnswesen).

The award of fiefs often replaced the remuneration for work. This was necessary because the monetary system necessary to make regular payments was still far too underdeveloped during the early Middle Ages.

=== Subsequent development ===
Feudalism in the Holy Roman Empire differed from the situation elsewhere in Europe. Until the end of the Salian dynasty, royal powers were strong enough to prevent the decentralisation of power to the minor nobles like France; it was not yet common for vassals to be granted fiefs (except in the areas bordering France). Counts and bishops still functioned as royal appointees rather than hereditary lords, and it was still common for the peasants to be free tenants or freeholders instead of serfs. Feudatories were also much more limited in their powers, not being permitted to mint coinage, wage war or construct independent castles as their French counterparts did, although German nobles were more autonomous than Anglo-Norman nobles. However, with the civil wars in the reign of Henry IV and the suppression of the Duchy of Saxony by Frederick Barbarossa, the Holy Roman Empire rapidly fragmented into feudal estates.

As the services of the vassal specifically included military service, under the Frankish monarchy the feudal system was for centuries the basis of the army as well as the social organization of the Holy Roman Empire.

It was not only the king who acquired vassals in this way. He was soon imitated by secular and ecclesiastical magnates. Gradually, the principle of the heritability of fiefs was established along with the admissibility of passing them on as Afterlehen to sub-vassals. The latter were also declared as heritable in 1037 by Conrad II in the constitutio de feudis. So it came to pass that as early as the 12th century, all duchies and counties were awarded as fiefs.

Within each of these ecclesiastical and secular territories, however, there was a variety of types of feudalism. Not until the 13th century, did the importance of the feudal system decline, because instead of vassals (Vassallen), liegemen (Dienstmannen) - well-educated men (cf. the development of the university system) - were appointed. The kings encouraged this development, for political reasons, and so strengthened territorial lordship (Landesherrschaft), which replaced the feudal system empire-wide. This strengthening of territorial rulers had an impact that could not be reversed, so that the power of the various principalities did not reduce, unlike the situation in France and England.

In England, feudal ties were abolished as early as the Revolution of 1649, and then by an express decree by Charles II in 1660. In France they were abolished by the decisions of the National Assembly on 4 and 5 August 1789. In Germany, the dissolution of feudal associations (Lehnsverband) was a long process. Legally, it was abolished inter alia by the Confederation of the Rhine acts, in the Final Recess of the Reichsdeputation and the Frankfurt Constitution of 1849. One of the last fiefs was awarded in 1835, when the ailing Count Friedrich Wilhelm von Schlitz, known as Görtz, was enfeoffed with the spring at Salzschlirf and began to excavate it again. Those fiefs still in existence in the 20th century were abolished in 1947 by an Allied Control Council edict.

== Important principles of feudal law in the Holy Roman Empire ==
In general, the vassal (Lehnsmann) was granted land or free houses (Freihäuser) in return for his services. He could also provide services at the lord's residence and be accommodated there. Most of these so-called servi non cassati were given a fief as soon as one became available.

Official positions (Ämter) and sovereign rights over a particular territory (feudal regalia) could be awarded as a fief. It was in this way that the House of Thurn and Taxis received its Postlehen or postal service rights. In addition, there were numerous enfeoffments of church rights, church fiefs (Stifte or feudal ecclesiastica) and enfeoffments of foundations associated with an altar (feudum altaragli). Also, cash payments from the royal treasury or profits from certain duties could be awarded as a fief.

=== Feoffment ===
Feoffment (constitutio feudi, infeudatio) involved the vassal being formally seized of his fief through a commendation ceremony. In Frankish times, commendation centered around the so-called handclasping ceremony (Handgang): the vassal clasped his hands together and placed them in the hands of his lord, who then clasped his hands around those of his vassal. He thereby symbolically received the protection of his new superior. From the end of the 9th century, this act was expanded to include an oath of allegiance, which was usually sworn on a religious relic. The oath served to affirm the binding of the liegeman to his liege, but emphasized that the vassal had not lost his status as a free knight, because only the free could be bound by oath.

In the 11th century, the commendation ceremony required the liegeman to pay homage (homagium or Mannschaft), which involved the handclasping ceremony as well as a declaration of intent. The liege lord could also make a declaration, but he would often forego this. This was followed by the loyalty oath and sometimes a kiss. Since, in the Middle Ages, a binding legal act could be constituted by a symbolic action, an object was symbolically handed over in a process known as livery of seizin and could be a staff or a banner (called a Fahnenlehn). The emperor could also symbolically hand over his sceptre (in the so-called Zepterlehen). As literacy rose, a charter of feoffment was also made out as part of the act that, over time, listed the feoffed estate and benefits that the vassal was to receive in ever increasing detail.

In the late Middle Ages, an entry fee was demanded for feoffment, which was often based on the fief's annual income.

The fief (benefice) that the vassal received could be owned by the lord or have been granted in fee by another. Sometimes the vassal even sold or gifted over his possessions to the lord (Lehnsauftragung) and then received it back as a fief (oblatio feudi). This was usually done in the hope that the liege lord could defend his estate better in the event of a dispute in the field or at court. The lord purchased or accepted the gift because he might have the intention or hope, for example, of merging unrelated fiefdoms into a whole and thus extending his sphere of influence, for example, in terms of jurisdiction, or the appointment of clergy.

=== Legal relationship between lords and vassals ===
From the 11th century, the obligations of vassals were usually described as auxilium et consilium (help and advice). Auxilium usually implied assistance in terms of military service that the vassal had to render. This could be unlimited, i.e. the vassal had to assist his lord in every conflict, or it could be limited in time, space and in the number of troops to be raised. With the advent of the mercenaries, the reliance on vassals became less important and their service increasingly took the form of administration and court duties. Consilium meant primarily the obligation to appear at imperial assemblies or Hoftage. Vassals whose feudal lord was not the king took part in the councils of their liege lords. They also had to administer justice over their subjects in the name of their master.

The vassal could even be required to pay money; though perhaps not to the extent of England, where military service became a requirement for war funds and the English king used the money to pay for his mercenaries. Monetary payments were also required in other cases, such as to pay a ransom for a captive lord, for the accolade of his eldest son, for the dowry of his eldest daughter, or for a journey to the Holy Land.

The feudal lord could also demand recompense (Lehnserneuerung or renovatio investiturae) from his vassals if they lost their fief or upon changes of lord - changes of ruler at any level, local lord, prince or king (known as Herrenfall, Hauptfall, Thronfall) - as well as changes of vassal (known as Lehnsfall, Vasallenfall or Mannfall, Nebenfall). The latter had to submit a written application (Lehnsmutung) within a year and a day (actually 1 year, 6 weeks, 3 days) and ask for the renewal of his investiture, but this term could be extended by a decree from the lord (Lehnsindult).

Depending on local law, the vassal might be liable, apart from the fee, for the renewal of the enfeoffment (called the Schreibschilling or Lehnstaxe), to pay a special tax (the Laudemium, Lehnsgeld, Lehnsware or Handlohn). Finally, in the event of a felony by the vassal, the lord could confiscate the fief under the so-called Privationsklage action or step in to prevent the deterioration of the estate, if necessary, by legal means. He could also assert his claim to ownership at any time against any unauthorized third parties.

The duties of the lords were less precisely defined, however, they were largely discharged on the handover of the fief. The vassal always had a claim to loyalty from his lord (Lehnsprotektion) and a breach of that by the lord meant the loss of his sovereignty over his vassal. The vassal had the "right of use" of the fief (the object of enfeoffment or Lehnsobjekt). The lord also had to represent his vassals in court.

=== Inheritance and alienation of church land ===
The most prized and contested rights that attached to benefices were inheritance and security against confiscation. Benefices were lands granted by the Church to faithful lords. In exchange, the Church expected rent or other services, such as military protection. These lands would then be further divided between lesser lords and commoners. This was the nature of European feudalism. Inheritance was an important issue, since land could fall into the hands of those who did not have loyalty to the Church or the great lords. The usual grant was in precaria, the granting of a life tenure, whereby the tenant stayed on the land only at the pleasure of the lord. The tenant could be expelled from the land at any time. His tenancy was precarious. Counts' benefices came to be inherited as counties were broken up and as counts assimilated their offices and ex-officio lands to their family property. In central Europe, kings and counts probably were willing to allow the inheritance of small parcels of land to the heirs of those who had offered military or other services in exchange for tenancy. This was contingent on the heirs being reasonably loyal and capable. Churches in Germany, as elsewhere, were willing to allow peasants to inherit their land. This was a source of profit to both churches and lords when the inheritors were charged a fee to inherit the land. Most bishops had a different attitude toward freemen and nobles. To these peasants, grants were made in precario or in beneficio, usually for a specified and limited number of life tenures. It was not impossible to recover land left to noble families for generations. But the longer the family held church land, the more difficult it was to oust them from the land. Some church officials came to view granting land to noble families amounted to outright alienation. By the twelfth century great churches in Germany, like those elsewhere were finding it difficult to hold out against the accumulation of lay custom and lay objections to temporary inheritance. The Bishop of Worms issued a statement in 1120 indicating the poor and unfree should be allowed to inherit tenancy without payment of fees. It appears to have been something novel. The growing masses of unfree and the marginal were needed for labour, and to bolster the military of both nobility and the church. By the time of Henry IV, bargaining by the peasants for the benefit of the group was the norm.

=== Dissolution of a feudal relationship ===
Originally, a lord-vassal tie (Lehnsbindung) was a lifelong, faithful relationship that could end only on death. It was also inconceivable that someone could be the vassal of more than one lord. In fact, multiple vassalage soon emerged and loosened the duty of loyalty for the liegeman (Lehnsmann) considerably. Also, the opportunity to inherit a fief diminished the ability of the lord to intervene and loosened the personal loyalty of liegemen. Over time, the importance of fiefdoms increased more and more, whilst the duty of loyalty faded increasingly into the background. In the end, a fief was simply an estate for which the heir had to perform a certain ceremony.

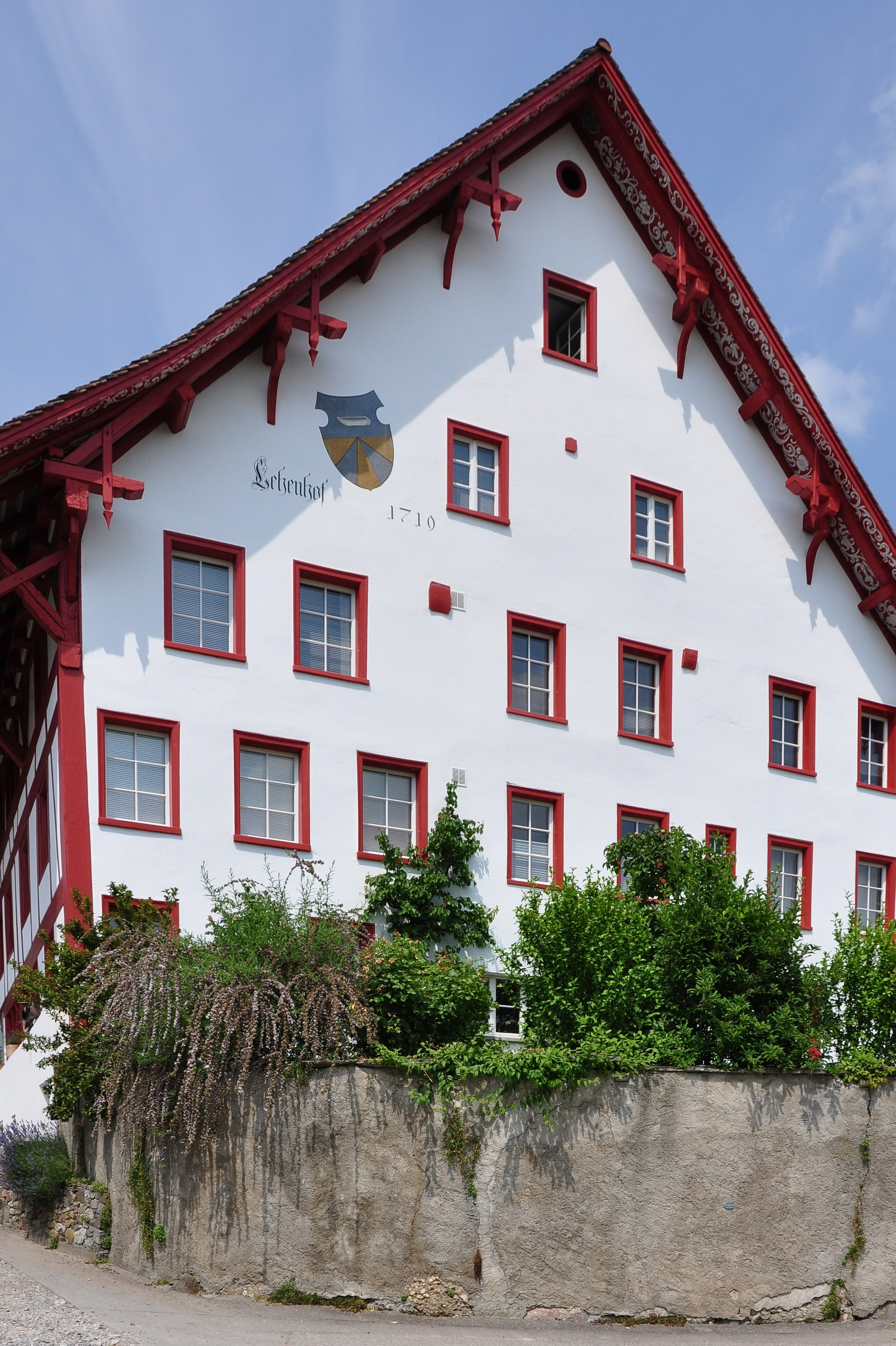
The Lehenhof built in 1710 in Seegräben, Switzerland

== Summary ==
In summary, the feudal system was based on two main components - the personal and the material elements.

Personal element: The lord and vassal committed themselves to mutual loyalty. The visible expression of this commitment was the act of the vassal placing his hands in those of his lord (handgang - comparable with today's handshake, except that the handgang symbolized a hierarchical relation).

Material element: Based on the pledge of loyalty between them, the lord made land available to the vassal. The vassal was obliged, in return, to render various services and taxes.

== Family, house and place names ==
An echo of the old feudal system in Europe is found in family names such as Lehner, Lechner, Lehmann, Lenhardt, Lehle, Horrigan and Lenherr as well as in numerous house and even place names, that even today have the term Lehen in the names (see a list at Lehen (disambiguation)).

== See also ==
- Feudalism

== Literature ==
- Marc Bloch: Die Feudalgesellschaft, durchgesehene Neuausgabe, Klett-Cotta, Stuttgart, 1999, ISBN 3-608-91234-7.
- Jürgen Dendorfer / Roman Deutinger (ed.): Das Lehnswesen im Hochmittelalter. Forschungskonstrukte – Quellenbefunde – Deutungsrelevanz. Thorbecke, Ostfildern, 2010, ISBN 978-3-7995-4286-9 (description that offers a current record of the 11th and 12th centuries; Rezension)
- François Louis Ganshof: Was ist das Lehnswesen?, 7. Aufl., Wissenschaftliche Buchgesellschaft, Darmstadt, 1989. ISBN 3-534-00927-4. (classic overview of the feudal model)
- Alain Guerreau: L'avenir d'un passé incertain. Le Seuil, Paris, 2001
- Steffen Patzold: Das Lehnswesen. Munich, 2012, ISBN 978-3-406-63235-8. (account that looks at the current state of research and the perception of the 19th century compared with recent critics)
- Karl-Heinz Spieß: Stichwort „Lehn(s)recht, Lehnswesen.“ In: Handwörterbuch zur deutschen Rechtsgeschichte. Vol. 2, Berlin, 1978. Sp. 1725–1741.
- Karl-Heinz Spieß: Das Lehnswesen in Deutschland im hohen und späten Mittelalter. 2nd improved and expanded edition, Steiner, Stuttgart, 2009, ISBN 978-3-515-09180-0.
