= Dominium directum et utile =

Dominium directum et utile is a legal Latin term used to refer to the two separate estates in land that a fief was split into under feudal land tenure. This system is more commonly known as duplex dominium or double domain. This can be contrasted with the modern allodial system, in which ownership is full and not divided into separate estates—a situation known as dominium plenum "full ownership".

== Definitions ==
Dominium directum et utile is composed of:

- Dominium directum (or eminent domain, superiority): the landlord's estate consisting of the right to dispose of property and to collect rents (feu-duty) and feudal incidents (fees, services, etc.) accruing from it.
- Dominium utile (or utile domain): the tenant's estate encompassing the rights to enjoy (use), make improvements to, or profit from property, and to keep the income or profit; includes e.g. the right to occupy and dwell on land and the right to keep the fructus naturales and emblements from agriculture.

These terms are built from Latin dominium ‘ownership’, directum ‘direct’, and utile ‘useful’.

Property is defined to mean a thing and those things that are naturally attached to it. For land, that would include buildings, trees, underground resources, etc. It would not include "movable" property, such as wagons or livestock.

- The holder of the dominium directum is considered the superior (i.e., the lord); the holder of the dominium utile is considered the inferior (i.e., the vassal).
- Dominium utile includes the tenant's right to keep any income or profit derived from the property.
- The transfer of the dominium directum does not affect the rights of any holders of dominium utile. The holder of the dominium utile had the right of inheritance. He could buy and then sell the land rights to another person and transfer the feudal responsibilities to the new holder. The transaction had to be approved by the senior (feudal lord) or his deputy and then entered into the land register.

== Additional explanations ==
The "lord" holding dominium directum may be anyone with sovereign power over the asset, such as a monarch or other nobility, or an established Church.

== See also ==
- Dominium
- Fiefdom
- Feudal law
