= Fealty =

Pledge of allegiance of one person to another

An oath of fealty, from the Latin fidelitas (faithfulness), is a pledge of allegiance of one person to another.

== Definition ==
In medieval Europe, the swearing of fealty took the form of an oath made by a vassal, or subordinate, to his lord. "Fealty" also referred to the duties incumbent upon a vassal that were owed to the lord, which consisted of service and aid.

One part of the oath of fealty included swearing to always remain faithful to the lord. The oath of fealty usually took place after the act of homage, when, by the symbolic act of kneeling before the lord and placing his hands between the hands of the lord, the vassal became the "man" of the lord. Usually, the lord also promised to provide for the vassal in some form, either through the granting of a fief or by some other manner of support. Typically, the oath took place upon a religious object such as a Bible or saint's relic, often contained within an altar, thus binding the oath-taker before God. Fealty and homage were key elements of European feudalism.

Fealty is distinct from other parts of the homage ceremony, and is usually used only to refer to that part of the ceremony where a vassal swore to be a good vassal to his lord.

== History ==
In medieval Europe, an oath of fealty (German: Lehnseid) was a fundamental element of the feudal system in the Holy Roman Empire. It was sworn between two people, the feudal subject or liegeman (vassal) and his feudal superior (liege lord). The oath of allegiance was usually carried out as part of a traditional ceremony in which the liegeman or vassal gave his lord a pledge of loyalty and acceptance of the consequences of a breach of trust. In return, the liege lord promised to protect and remain loyal to his vassal. This relationship formed the basis of landholding, known as feudal tenure, whereby the seizin vested in the tenant (the vassal) was so similar to actual possession that it was considered a separate estate described as utile domain (dominium utile), literally "beneficial ownership", whereas the landlord's estate was referred to as eminent domain or superiority (dominium directum, lit. "direct ownership").

In the Late Middle Ages, the investiture and oath of fealty were invariably recorded by a deed; in modern times, this replaced the traditional ceremony. Where the geographical distance between the two parties was significant, the lord could name a representative before whom the oath was to be sworn.

The whole contract including the oath of fealty was part of a formal commendation ceremony that created the feudal relationship.

The term is also used by English-speakers to refer to similar oaths of allegiance in other feudal cultures, as with medieval Japan, as well as in modern organized crime.

== General and cited references ==
- Coredon, Christopher (2007). A Dictionary of Medieval Terms & Phrases (Reprint ed.). Woodbridge: D. S. Brewer. ISBN 978-1-84384-138-8.
- McGurk, J. J. N. (1970). A Dictionary of Medieval Terms: For the Use of History Students. Reigate, UK: Reigate Press for St Mary's College of Education. OCLC 138858.
- Saul, Nigel (2000). "Feudalism". A Companion to Medieval England 1066–1485. Stroud: Tempus. pp. 102–105. ISBN 0-7524-2969-8.
