= Buchkogel (Plabutsch) =

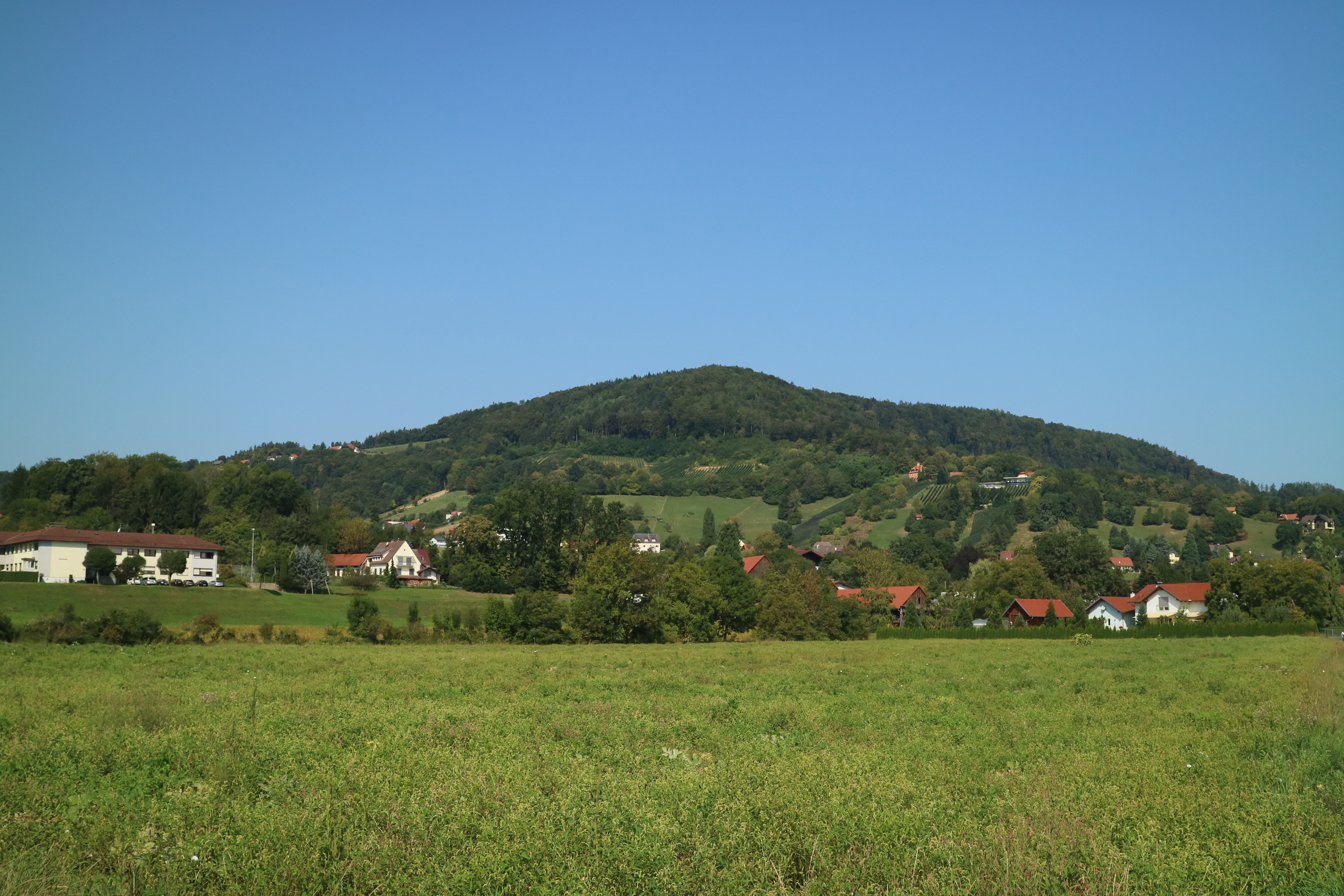
- Buchkogel from the south east

Highest point
- Elevation: 656 m (2,152 ft)
- Prominence: 173 m ↓ by Mantschastraße
- Isolation: 3.9 km → Gaisberg
- Coordinates: 47°12′4″N 15°28′32″E

Geography
- Location within Austria
- Location: Styria, Austria
- Parent range: Grazer Bergland, Lavanttal Alps

Climbing
- Easiest route: hiking

The Buchkogel, at 656 meters above sea level, is a hill in the Austrian state of Styria. It is located in the southern part of the Grazer Bergland in the west of the state capital Graz. The mixed forests within the Plabutsch ridge serve as a popular recreation area. Parts of the karstified hill were settled back in the Chalcolithic period and served for limonite mining during the Middle Ages and World War II. On the top there is the historical Kronprinz Rufolf observation tower built in 1879. The name Buchkogel is either derived from a lost castle (German Burg) or the extensive beech (German Buche) population.

== Geography ==
=== Location ===
The mostly forest-covered hill is situated near the western border of the 16th city district Straßgang. It is part of the Plabutsch ridge which borders the wide Mur valley (Grazer Feld) in the west. On an eastern spur of Buchkogel St. Martin's château and church can be found, a smaller church consecrated to John and Paul is located on the hill ridge about a mile northeast of the summit. While the whole hill is part of a landscape protection area the south-eastern slopes (Kehlberg) are partially being cultivated as vineyards.

=== Geology and geomorphology ===
Buchkogel, like the rest of the hill ridge, is built from mid-Devonian limestones and dolomite rocks which are part of the Graz Paleozoic. Underneath lie dolomite sandstones, diabase tuffs and fossil-rich limestones. A local specialty is the occurrence of grey and brown Rauchwacken, yellow and brown, mostly mylonitic limestones and brown clay-slates that all together form a layer up to 100 meters thick. Anton Schäfer dubbed this lithology Braungesteine because of its characteristic brown weathering. The approximately north–south-striking Devonian layer package falls on average 30 degrees to the west and is determined by a fracture tectonic with the main direction east–west. The hill ridge is divided into individual blocks with different strike directions, some of which also vary within these units. The largely thick-stratified carbonate rocks reacted to the tectonic stress by breaking.

=== Karst hydrology ===
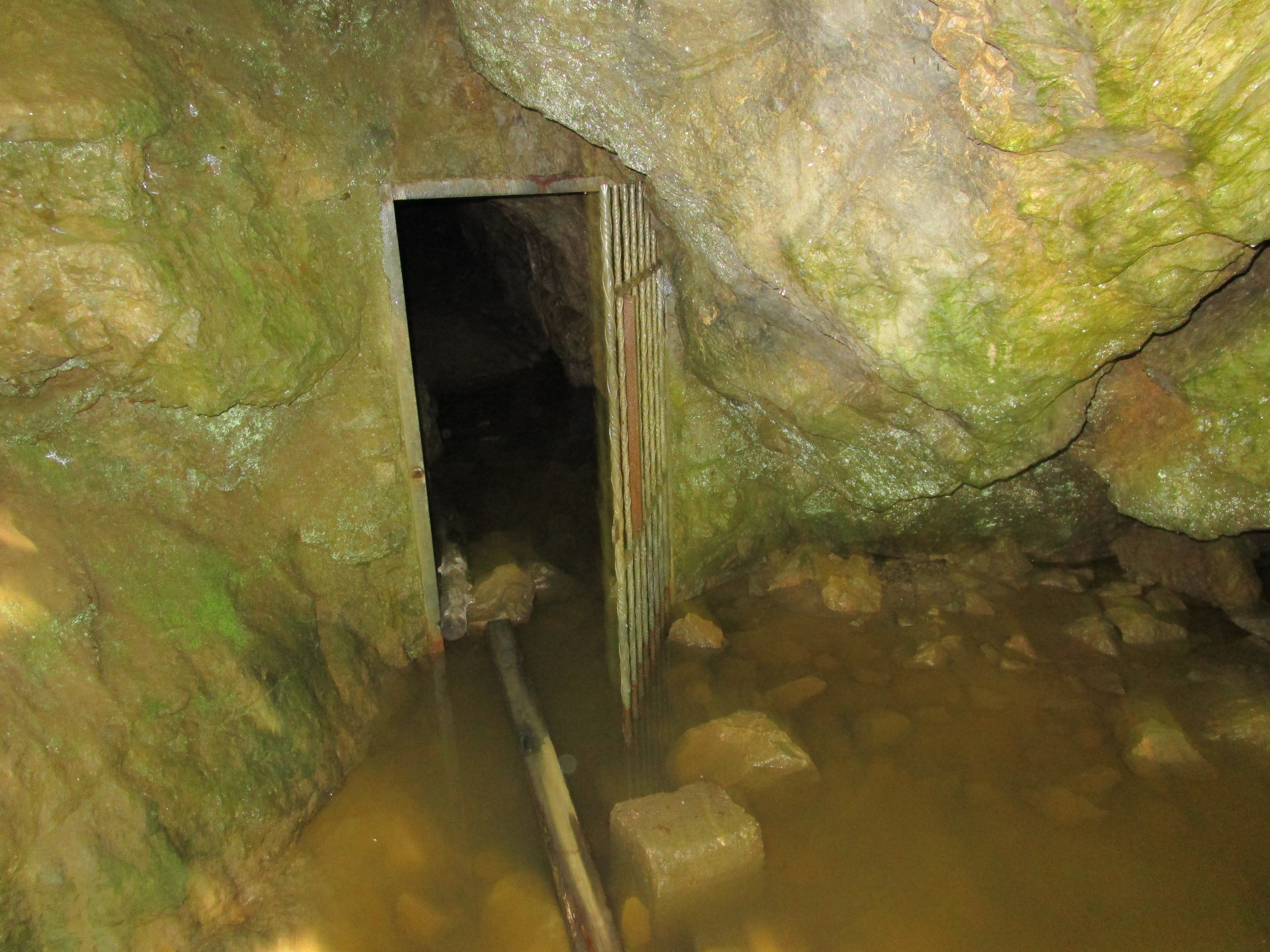
Entrance to Eisbründl Cave after summer rainfall

In the course of these processes profound joints were created that made the development of caves and sinkholes possible. Following the miocene karstification, the ridge was buried under loose sediments. The removal of these sediments during the Riss/Würm interglacial period happened asymmetrical because of the mighty down-cutting of the Mur river. As a result, the eastern slope of the Buchkogel shows a concave profile. On the western side a blind valley with numerous sinkholes and little poljes was formed. The sparse creeks run through a ponor into the mountain and emerge from the Eisbründlhöhle, a small cave about 70 meters below on the eastern foot of the hill. At that sea level the Devonian rocks meet the loamy and thus water-damming sediments of the Riss terrace. The subsurface connection at the narrowest part of the hill ridge could be scientifically verified in the 1950s via dye tracing. This means that the hill has its own closed karst water system which is not connected to the Mur valley's groundwater body.

== Flora and fauna ==
The Buchkogel which is mainly owned by the Gebäude- und Baumanagement (building and construction management) GmbH Graz is covered by thermophilic deciduous and mixed forests. The dominant tree species is Fagus sylvatica or common beech (German Rotbuche) that possibly led to the hill's name. Other species at the dry warm locations are Acer campestre, Quercus petraea, Sorbus aucuparia, Tilia cordata and Viburnum lantana. Reforested spruce trees, pretty common in the surroundings, are rather rare to be found. The forests on the western city border of Graz not only serve as recreation area, but also make an important contribution to the urban climate, especially regarding the air quality.

Along with the rest of the ridge Buchkogel serves as habitat for the chamois. The total number of chamois within the Graz city borders has been estimated at 50 to 70 individuals by September 2018. The area north of the Buchkogel has been called ornithologically significant after a breeding bird survey in 2000/01. The observed species include Grey-headed woodpecker, Green woodpecker, Stock dove, Black woodpecker, Black stork and Eurasian sparrowhawk, all protected under the Council Directive 92/43/EEC on the Conservation of natural habitats and of wild fauna and flora. In the area of the blind valley Lesser spotted woodpecker and Red-backed shrike also occur as breeding birds. Four of them (Green woodpecker, Stock dove, Eurasian sparrowhawk and Lesser spotted woodpecker) are included on the IUCN Red List.

== History ==
=== Archeological discoveries ===
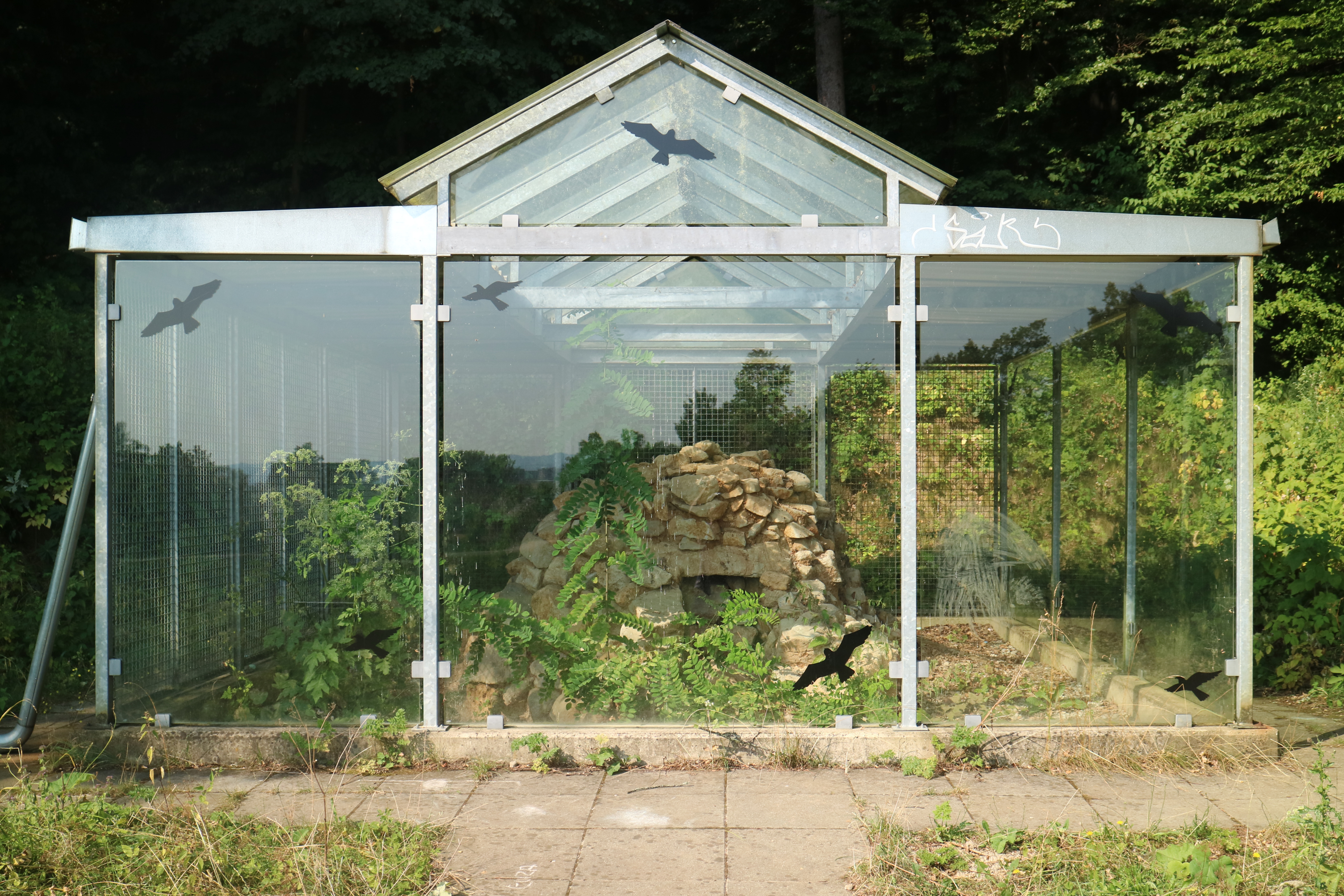
Glass house with tumulus

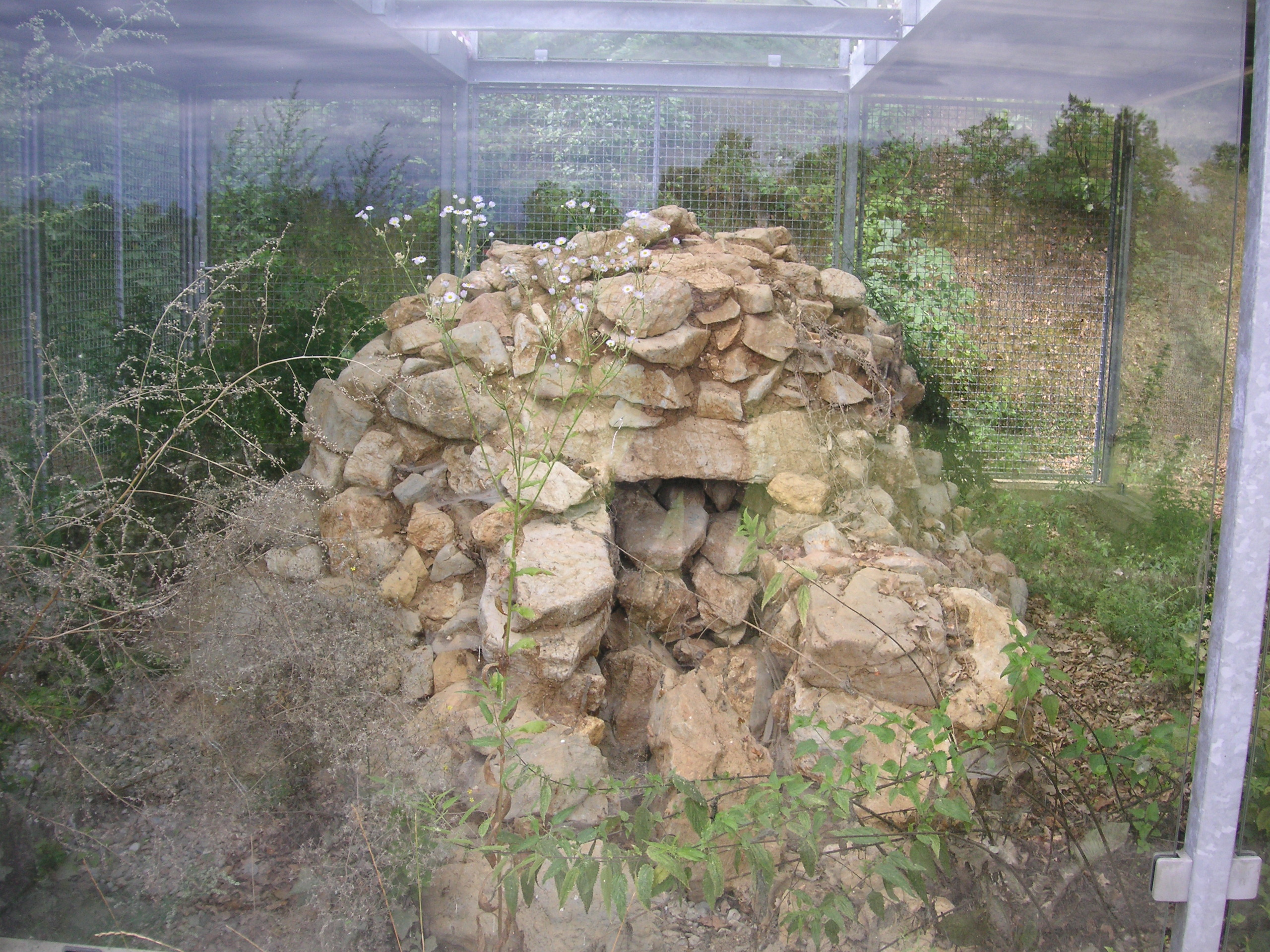
Exposed tumulus

Some hundred meters north of the top of Buchkogel the oldest settlement remains in Graz have been discovered. In 2004 their age was first estimated to 4000 BC, two house layouts could later be dated to about 3500 BC after more detailed investigations. The thatched houses were built via post in ground construction with palisades. During the excavations also a stone axe, spindle whorls and loom weights were found which indicate the existence of a flint workshop. All findings are being linked to the Lasinja culture that migrated from Southeast Europe to the Alps during the Chalcolithic period.

On the eastern foothill one of about 15 Roman grave fields in Graz has been excavated. The grave field is known since the 15th century and is composed of at least 18 tumuli. In the years 2003 and 2004 three of these tumuli were examined in detail for the first time ever. The middle one located at the edge of the forest turned out to be the most important one and revealed a completely preserved Roman grave for the first time in Graz. The beehive-shaped grave was built of clay-smeared limestone and has a dromos and an almost unharmed grave chamber. The nearly round chamber with a diameter of 2.8 and a height of about 1.4 meters contained the remains of two or three funerals as well as intact grave goods. Along with a completely preserved tripod shell and the shards of a drinking cup the grave contained a copper or bronze coin with the face of Antoninus Pius which made it possible to date it back to the second century. The type of grave installation has been called typical for the region of northeast Styria and Burgenland. Both of the other graves were showing signs of looting but still contained fragments of a ceramic pot, broken glass and another coin. The first hill was roofed with a steel and glass construction and made visible for the public while the other two were filled up again. Because of its great condition the grave field has been declared a cultural heritage monument.

=== Ore mining ===
Following the alpine orogeny limonites were formed in the karst vents and pavements. The ore deposit is bound to a mighty, approximately north–south striking joint. It was already in use during the Middle Ages, as slag finds show. Presumptions of Noric or Roman iron smelting could not be verified. The deposit's modern exploration began before World War II. In 1938 an exploring permission was granted. The center of the mining area was located about 400 meters north of the top of Buchkogel. The minerals were explored through Röschen, in a 40 meter long, up to six meter wide quarry about 20 tons of ore were mined. Samples were sent to Andritz machine factory and to the ironworks in Sulzau-Werfen and Singen. Analyzes showed 61.8 percent iron with small quantities of silicon dioxide and manganese.

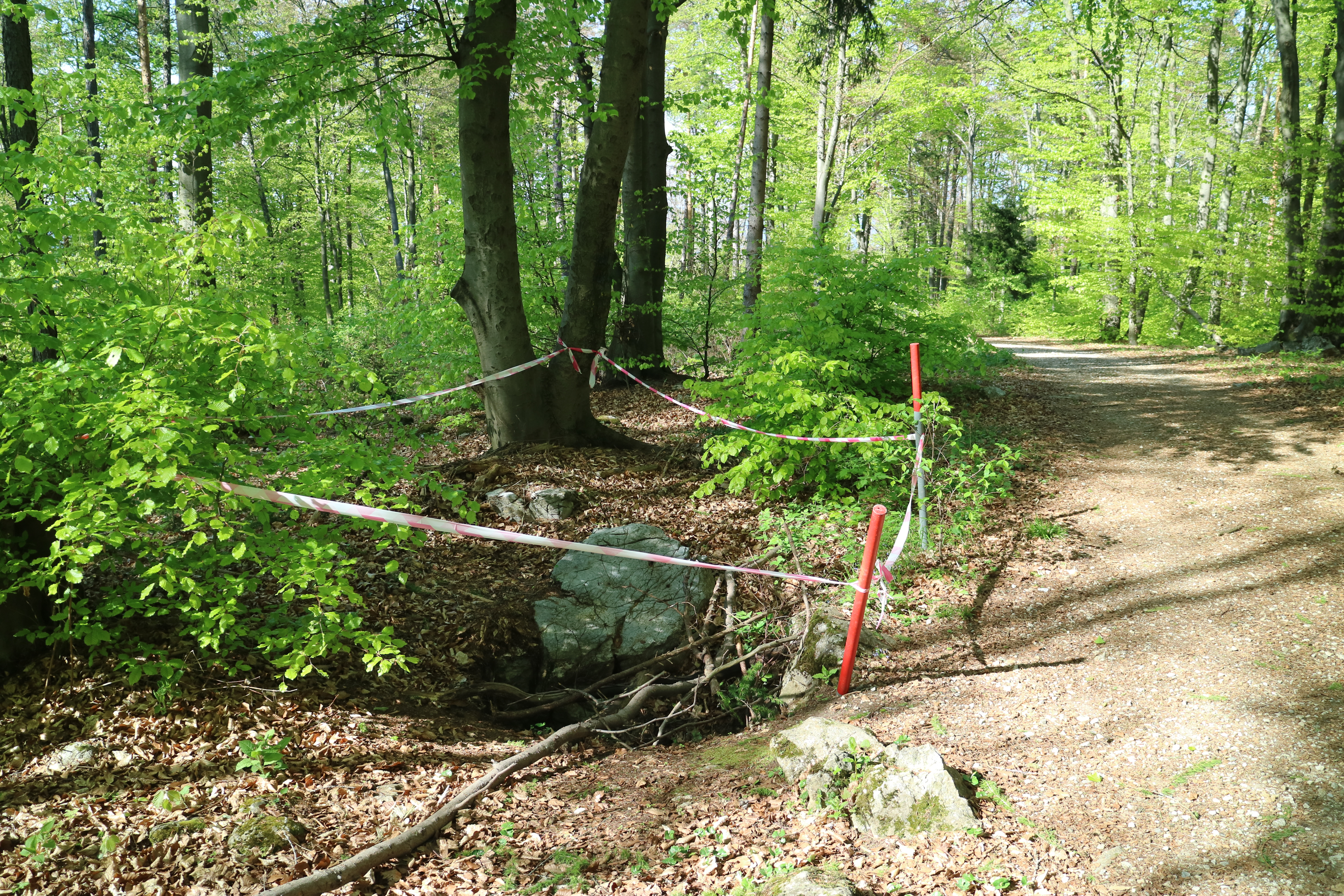
Recent pinge near the top of the hill

After that the deposit on the western slope was explored through adits. For the transportation of the minerals a 450 meters long and up to 40 degrees steep brake incline had been established. Further openings were done by a winze and an adit near the top of the brake incline. The deposit's thickness varied pretty much and reached an average of only 0.25 meters. According to O. M. Friedrich around 50,000 tons of ore were exposed beginning in 1939 but only a fraction of it was actually mined. In 1943 five workers produced a monthly crop of 40 to 50 tons, 70 percent iron ore and 30 percent colored ore. The former were delivered as a supplement for open hearth furnaces in Karviná-Třinec and Düsseldorf, the latter went to a paint factory in Gösting and an ultramarine factory in Weitenegg, Lower Austria. In 1944 another adit was dug on the western slope beneath the already existing one. Since the workforce was officially obliged to build air raid systems, the mining progressed pretty slowly.

Following the end of the war and the brake incline's devay, the surroundings of Buchkogel were searched for further ore deposits. Three of them were found including one on the eastern foothill. All together they produced 1605 tons of ochre in the first two post-war years. Despite high quality and an overall lack of the resource the mining on Buchkogel was stopped in 1948 eventually.

== Tourism ==
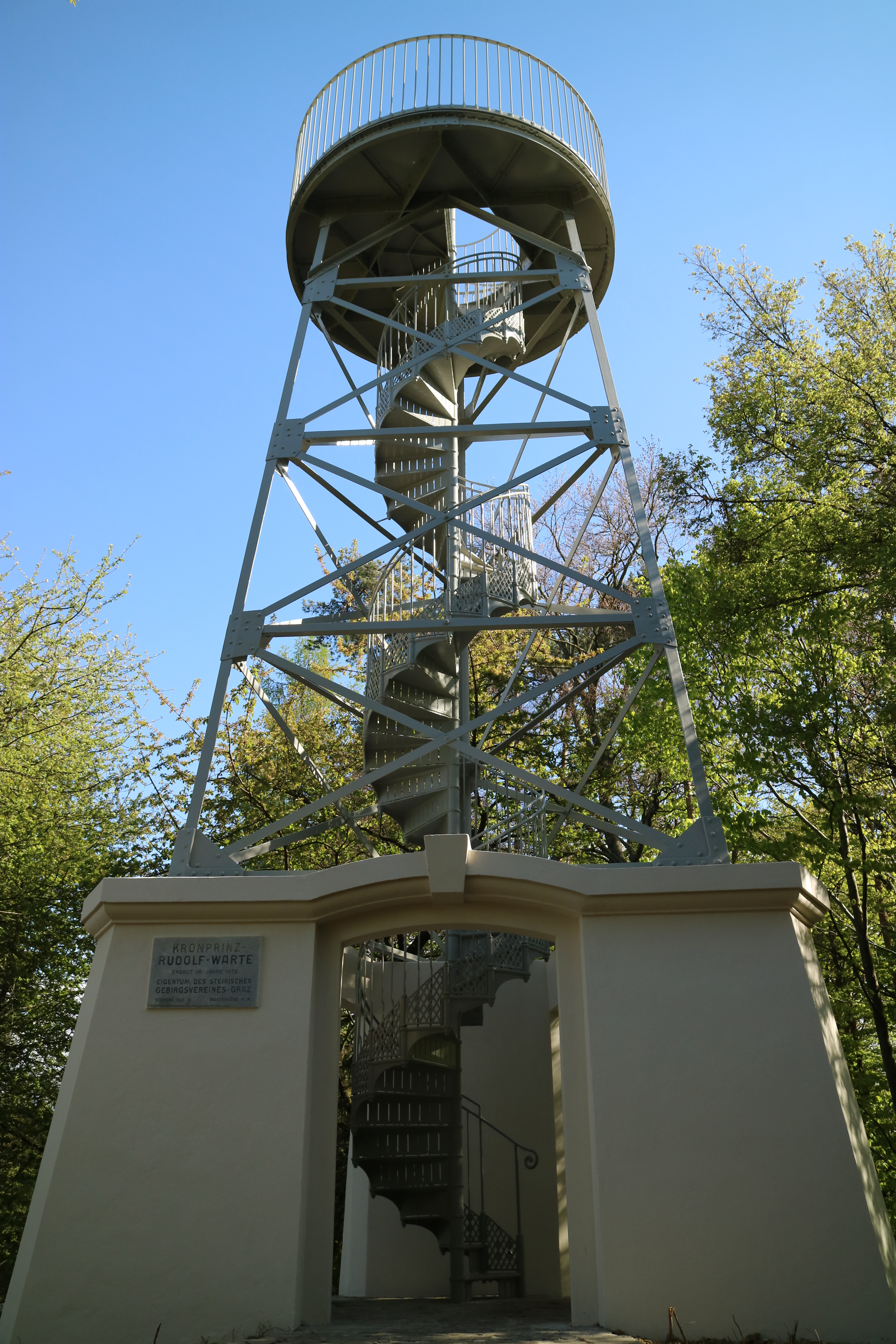
Kronprinz-Rudolf-Warte

The Buchkogel, along with Plabutsch and Platte (in the eastern part of Graz) is one of the most popular destinations located near the city border. Especially walkers and mountainbikers use the wooded hill for their leisure activities. A dense net of hiking trails and forest roads mainly covers the eastern hill slope facing the city. Only the north western slope is inaccessible to the public because of a Bundesheer shooting range. The western Styrian alternative of the Mariazeller Weg, a popular pilgrims' way, leads along the ridge. A frequently used access passes St. Martin's château as well as the remains of vineyard houses and a gasthaus before reaching the top. Northwest of St. Martin there is a forest trail that can be reached in ten to 15 minutes from two different bus stops.

On the hill top there is the Kronprinz-Rudolf-Warte, an observation tower that was built in 1879 and is eleven meters high. The iron construction was last renovated in 2017 and offers a view over the city of Graz. An octagonal predecessor structure had stood there since 1840. The historical observation tower is named after the emperor's son Rudolf, Crown Prince of Austria who committed suicide ten years after the construction. In 2010 a modern viewing platform was established at 567 meters above sea level, on the western slope of the hill. At 25 meters long, the wooden platform resembles an arrow and lasts on five stanchions up to 13 meters above the ground. The view towards the west covers parts of the Western Styrian hills as well as the Styrian Prealps.

== Bibliography ==
- Reiter, Annemarie (1994). Der Plabutsch. Der höchste Berg von Graz (in German). Graz: Verlag für Sammler. pp. 16–17 and 42–43. ISBN 3-85365-122-4.
- Schäfer, Anton (1937). Geologische Karte des Buchkogel-Florianibergzuges im Maßstabe 1:25.000 (in German). Graz: Mitteilungen des Naturwissenschaftlichen Vereins für Steiermark 74. pp. 133–143.
- Weiss, Alfred (1974). Bergbaue und Bergbauversuche im erweiterten Stadtgebiet (in German). Graz: Historisches Jahrbuch der Stadt Graz 5/6. pp. 150–152.
- Zötl, Josef (1953). Die hydrogeologischen Verhältnisse im Raume des Buchkogelzuges bei Graz (in German). Graz: Beiträge zur Hydrogeologie Steiermarks 6. pp. 24–31.
