= Free House =

Free House may refer to:

- Free House (horse), an American Thoroughbred racehorse
- Free house (pub), a British pub that is owned independently of the breweries that supply it

== See also ==
- Freihaus, a house within a town's walls but legally outside the town's domain
