= Lehen =

Lehen may refer to:

- List of places called Lehen
- Ľudovít Lehen (1925–2014), Slovak artist, sculptor and author
- Tuure Lehén (1893–1976), Finnish-Soviet politician, philosopher and historian

== See also ==
- Lehner (disambiguation)
- Fief (German: Lehen)
- Feudalism in the Holy Roman Empire
