= List of places called Lehen =

Lehen (German, 'fief') is the name of several places:

== Germany ==
- Lehen (Freiburg im Breisgau), a village in the borough of Freiburg im Breisgau, Baden-Württemberg
- Lehen (Deggenhausertal), a village in the municipality of Deggenhausertal, Bodenseekreis, Baden-Württemberg
- Lehen (Lenzkirch), a village in the municipality of Lenzkirch, county of Breisgau-Hochschwarzwald, Baden-Württemberg
- Lehen (Winden im Elztal), a village in the municipality of Winden im Elztal, county of Emmendingen, Baden-Württemberg
- Lehen (Eschbronn), a village in the municipality of Eschbronn, county of Rottweil, Baden-Württemberg
- Lehen (Schramberg), a village in the municipality of Schramberg, county of Rottweil, Baden-Württemberg
- Lehen (Triberg in the Black Forest), a village in the municipality of Triberg in the Black Forest, Schwarzwald-Baar-county of, Baden-Württemberg
- Lehen (Todtmoos), a village in the municipality of Todtmoos, county of Waldshut, Baden-Württemberg
- Lehen (Schömberg), a village in the municipality of Schömberg, Zollernalbkreis, Baden-Württemberg
- Lehen (Amtzell), a village in the municipality of Amtzell, county of Ravensburg, Baden-Württemberg
- Lehen (Stuttgart), A village in the municipality of Stuttgart, Baden-Württemberg
- Lehen (Feichten an der Alz), a village in the municipality of Feichten a.d.Alz, county of Altötting, Bavaria
- Lehen (Garching an der Alz), a village in the municipality of Garching an der Alz, county of Altötting, Bavaria
- Lehen (Gaißach), a village in the municipality of Gaißach, county of Bad Tölz-Wolfratshausen, Bavaria
- Lehen (Wackersberg), a village in the municipality of Wackersberg, county of Bad Tölz-Wolfratshausen, Bavaria
- Lehen (Weidenberg), a village in the municipality of Weidenberg, county of Bayreuth, Bavaria
- Lehen (Schöllnach), a village in the municipality of Schöllnach, county of Deggendorf, Bavaria
- Lehen (Loiching), a village in the municipality of Loiching, county of Dingolfing-Landau, Bavaria
- Lehen (Reisbach), a village in the municipality of Reisbach, county of Dingolfing-Landau, Bavaria
- Lehen (Simbach), a village in the municipality of Simbach, county of Dingolfing-Landau, Bavaria
- Lehen (Steinhöring), a village in the municipality of Steinhöring, county of Ebersberg, Bavaria
- Lehen (Sankt Wolfgang), a village in the municipality of Sankt Wolfgang, county of Erding, Bavaria
- Lehen (Taufkirchen (Vils)), a village in the municipality of Taufkirchen (Vils), county of Erding, Bavaria
- Lehen (Abensberg), a village in the municipality of Abensberg, county of Kelheim, Bavaria
- Lehen (Altfraunhofen), a village in the municipality of Altfraunhofen, county of Landshut, Bavaria
- Lehen (Hohenthann), a village in the municipality of Hohenthann, county of Landshut, Bavaria
- Lehen (Neufraunhofen), a village in the municipality of Neufraunhofen, county of Landshut, Bavaria
- Lehen (Niederaichbach), a village in the municipality of Niederaichbach, county of Landshut, Bavaria
- Lehen (Velden), a village in the municipality of Velden, county of Landshut, Bavaria
- Lehen (Wurmsham), a village in the municipality of Wurmsham, county of Landshut, Bavaria
- Lehen (Fischbachau), a village in the municipality of Fischbachau, county of Miesbach, Bavaria
- Lehen (Hausham), a village in the municipality of Hausham, county of Miesbach, Bavaria
- Lehen (Miesbach), a village in the municipality of Miesbach, county of Miesbach, Bavaria
- Lehen (Aicha vorm Wald), a village in the municipality of Aicha vorm Wald, county of Passau, Bavaria
- Lehen (Fürstenstein), a village in the municipality of Fürstenstein, county of Passau, Bavaria
- Lehen (Wolnzach), a village in the municipality of Wolnzach, county of Pfaffenhofen a.d.Ilm, Bavaria
- Lehen (Kollnburg), a village in the municipality of Kollnburg, county of Regen, Bavaria
- Lehen (Lindberg), a village in the municipality of Lindberg, county of Regen, Bavaria
- Lehen (Prackenbach), a village in the municipality of Prackenbach, county of Regen, Bavaria
- Lehen (Bernhardswald), a village in the municipality of Bernhardswald, county of Regensburg, Bavaria
- Lehen (Wenzenbach), a village in the municipality of Wenzenbach, county of Regensburg, Bavaria
- Lehen (Großkarolinenfeld), a village in the municipality of Großkarolinenfeld, county of Rosenheim, Bavaria
- Lehen (Pfaffing), a village in the municipality of Pfaffing, county of Rosenheim, Bavaria
- Lehen (Soyen), a village in the municipality of Soyen, county of Rosenheim, Bavaria
- Lehen (Falkenberg), a village in the municipality of Falkenberg, county of Rottal-Inn, Bavaria
- Lehen (Wittibreut), a village in the municipality of Wittibreut, county of Rottal-Inn, Bavaria
- Lehen (Zeilarn), a village in the municipality of Zeilarn, county of Rottal-Inn, Bavaria
- Lehen (Krummennaab), a village in the municipality of Krummennaab, county of Tirschenreuth, Bavaria
- Lehen (Petting), a village in the municipality of Petting, county of Traunstein, Bavaria
- Lehen (Tacherting), a village in the municipality of Tacherting, county of Traunstein, Bavaria
- Lehen (Bernbeuren), a village in the municipality of Bernbeuren, county of Weilheim-Schongau, Bavaria
- A village in the municipality of Ibbenbüren, county of Steinfurt, North Rhine-Westphalia
- A village in the municipality of Obergurig, county of Bautzen, Saxony

== Austria ==
- Lehen (Bischofstetten), village in the municipality of Bischofstetten, district of Melk, Lower Austria
- Lehen (Leiben), cadastral municipality of Leiben in Lower Austria
- Lehen (Gemeinde Oberndorf), cadastral municipality on the Melk in Lower Austria
- Lehen (Kirchberg), cadastral municipality of Kirchberg am Wechsel in Lower Austria
- Lehen (Mitterkirchen im Machland), a village in the municipality of Mitterkirchen, Upper Austria
- Lehen (Pühret), village in the municipality of Pühret, Upper Austria
- Lehen, Sankt Marienkirchen am Hausruck, see Sankt Marienkirchen am Hausruck
- Lehen (Annaberg-Lungötz), village near Annaberg-Lungötz, district of Hallein, Land Salzburg
- Lehen (Seekirchen), village near Seekirchen am Wallersee, district of Salzburg-Umgebung, Land Salzburg
- Lehen (Salzburg), suburb of Salzburg
- Lehen (Umhausen), hamlet in the parish of Niederthal, Umhausen, Tyrol
- Lehen (Telfs), village in Telfs, district of Innsbruck Land, Tyrol

== Slovenia ==
- Lehen na Pohorju, settlement in the municipality of Podvelka
