= Oblation (legal) =

In law, oblation is the voluntary transfer of a legal obligation or a title to a property. In medieval times in the Holy Roman Empire, an oblatio feudi or Lehnsauftragung meant a transfer of property, freely held by its owner, such as a castle or lordship, to another lord, in order to receive it back from that lord as a fief. In doing so, the liege lord acquired the full right of ownership.

A similar term was the oblatio litis, whereby someone took over a legal dispute as the defendant, without being the actual defendant.
