= Duorum in solidum dominium vel possessio esse non potest =

Duorum in solidum dominium vel possessio esse non potest is Latin legal term meaning "Sole ownership or possession cannot be in two persons" / "Two persons cannot own or possess a thing in the entirety."

It is a variation of a more popular Latin legal phrase, which is attested to in Coke's Institutes: Duo non possunt in solido unam rem possidere: "Ownership of a whole cannot be shared; right of ownership must be divided into portions."

== See also ==
- Roman law
- civil law (legal system)
- dominium
- in solido
