= Hubbard, Oregon =

- City
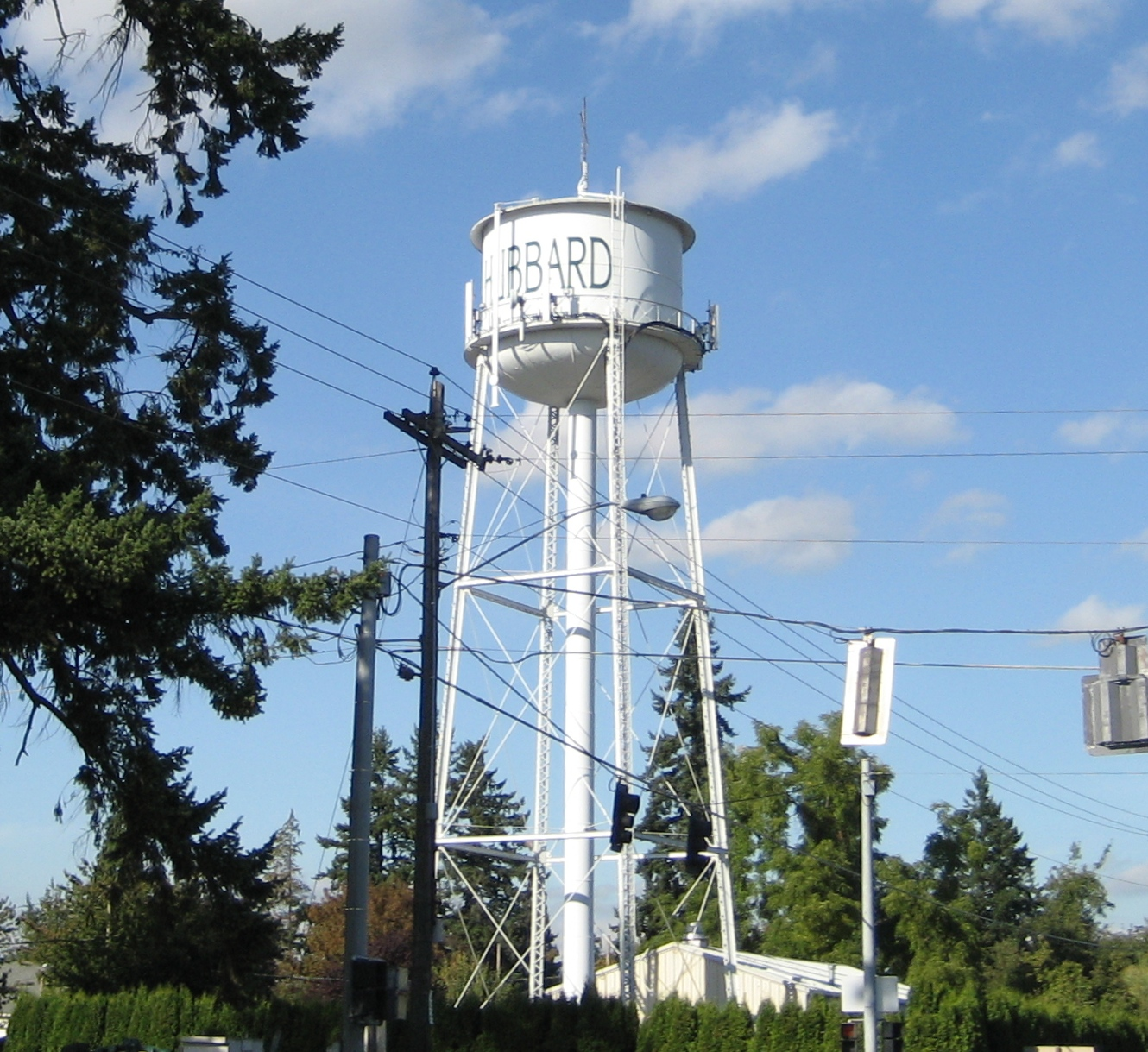
- The watertower in Hubbard
- Nickname: Home of the Hop Fest
- Location in Oregon
- Coordinates: 45°10′53″N 122°48′30″W
- Country: United States
- State: Oregon
- County: Marion
- Incorporated: 1891

Government
  - Mayor: Charles Rostocil

Area
  - Total: 0.80 sq mi (2.08 km^{2})
  - Land: 0.80 sq mi (2.08 km^{2})
  - Water: 0 sq mi (0.00 km^{2})
- Elevation: 184 ft (56 m)

Population (2020)
  - Total: 3,426
  - Density: 4,274.2/sq mi (1,650.26/km^{2})
- Time zone: UTC−08:00 (Pacific)
  - Summer (DST): UTC−07:00 (Pacific)
- ZIP Code: 97032
- Area code: 503
- FIPS code: 41-35450
- GNIS feature ID: 2410798
- Website: www.cityofhubbard.org

Hubbard is a city in Marion County, Oregon, United States. The population was 3,426 at the 2020 census. It is part of the Salem Metropolitan Statistical Area.

== History ==
Hubbard was named for Charles Hubbard, who was an Oregon settler in 1847. The railroad arrived in 1870 and a station was situated in the town.

The city made the news when then-former President of the United States Donald Trump, as a write-in candidate, won a seat on the board of the Hubbard Rural Fire Protection District in 2023 via a dice-roll tiebreaker over four other write-ins. However, since he didn't live in or own property in the district, he was excluded from the board.

== Geography ==
Hubbard is in northern Marion County along Oregon Route 99E, which leads north 28 miles (45 km) to Portland and south 21 miles (34 km) to Salem, the state capital and county seat. According to the U.S. Census Bureau, Hubbard has an area of 0.80 square miles (2.07 km^{2}), all land. The city is bordered to the northwest by Mill Creek, a northeast-flowing tributary of the Pudding River and part of the Willamette River watershed.

== Demographics ==
Historical population
Census	Pop.	Note	%±
1880	141		—
1890	117		−17.0%
1900	213		82.1%
1910	283		32.9%
1920	320		13.1%
1930	330		3.1%
1940	387		17.3%
1950	493		27.4%
1960	526		6.7%
1970	975		85.4%
1980	1,640		68.2%
1990	1,881		14.7%
2000	2,483		32.0%
2010	3,173		27.8%
2020	3,426		8.0%
2022 (est.)	3,959		15.6%
U.S. Decennial Census

=== 2020 census ===
As of the 2020 census, Hubbard had a population of 3,426. The median age was 32.9 years. 29.7% of residents were under the age of 18 and 9.7% of residents were 65 years of age or older. For every 100 females there were 98.8 males, and for every 100 females age 18 and over there were 98.0 males age 18 and over.

100.0% of residents lived in urban areas, while 0% lived in rural areas.

There were 1,037 households in Hubbard, of which 49.5% had children under the age of 18 living in them. Of all households, 59.1% were married-couple households, 13.0% were households with a male householder and no spouse or partner present, and 20.8% were households with a female householder and no spouse or partner present. About 12.7% of all households were made up of individuals and 6.0% had someone living alone who was 65 years of age or older.

There were 1,064 housing units, of which 2.5% were vacant. Among occupied housing units, 75.0% were owner-occupied and 25.0% were renter-occupied. The homeowner vacancy rate was 1.1% and the rental vacancy rate was 1.1%.

Racial composition as of the 2020 census
Race	Number	Percent
White	1,981	57.8%
Black or African American	11	0.3%
American Indian and Alaska Native	68	2.0%
Asian	23	0.7%
Native Hawaiian and Other Pacific Islander	8	0.2%
Some other race	904	26.4%
Two or more races	431	12.6%
Hispanic or Latino (of any race)	1,478	43.1%

=== 2010 census ===
As of the census of 2010, there were 3,173 people, 958 households, and 756 families living in the city. The population density was 4,469.0 inhabitants per square mile (1,725.5/km^{2}). There were 1,002 housing units at an average density of 1,411.3 per square mile (544.9/km^{2}). The racial makeup of the city was 73.3% White, 0.5% African American, 2.3% Native American, 0.9% Asian, 0.1% Pacific Islander, 19.4% from other races, and 3.4% from two or more races. Hispanic or Latino of any race were 36.3% of the population.

There were 958 households, of which 49.9% had children under the age of 18 living with them, 60.9% were married couples living together, 13.0% had a female householder with no husband present, 5.0% had a male householder with no wife present, and 21.1% were non-families. 15.0% of all households were made up of individuals, and 4.7% had someone living alone who was 65 years of age or older. The average household size was 3.31 and the average family size was 3.71.

The median age in the city was 30.1 years. 33.7% of residents were under the age of 18; 9% were between the ages of 18 and 24; 30.6% were from 25 to 44; 20.1% were from 45 to 64; and 6.6% were 65 years of age or older. The gender makeup of the city was 50.3% male and 49.7% female.

=== 2000 census ===
As of the census of 2000, there were 2,483 people, 753 households, and 594 families living in the city. The population density was 3,992.2 inhabitants per square mile (1,541.4/km^{2}). There were 799 housing units at an average density of 1,284.6 per square mile (496.0/km^{2}). The racial makeup of the city was 68.87% White, 0.32% African American, 1.93% Native American, 0.48% Asian, 0.12% Pacific Islander, 25.61% from other races, and 2.66% from two or more races. Hispanic or Latino of any race were 32.66% of the population.

There were 753 households, out of which 46.5% had children under the age of 18 living with them, 60.2% were married couples living together, 13.4% had a female householder with no husband present, and 21.0% were non-families. 15.4% of all households were made up of individuals, and 5.7% had someone living alone who was 65 years of age or older. The average household size was 3.30 and the average family size was 3.67.

In the city, the population was spread out, with 34.5% under the age of 18, 9.1% from 18 to 24, 32.8% from 25 to 44, 16.4% from 45 to 64, and 7.2% who were 65 years of age or older. The median age was 29 years. For every 100 females, there were 102.2 males. For every 100 females age 18 and over, there were 100.6 males.

The median income for a household in the city was $38,850, and the median income for a family was $42,552. Males had a median income of $32,731 versus $24,226 for females. The per capita income for the city was $14,383. About 11.0% of families and 14.8% of the population were below the poverty line, including 20.0% of those under age 18 and 9.0% of those age 65 or over.

== Transportation ==
- Lenhardt Airpark

== Notable people ==
- Bill Bevens (1916–1991), Major League Baseball player
- Marion Eugene Carl (1915-1998), World War II fighter ace
- Sally Hughes-Schrader (1895–1984), zoologist
- Levi Rolla Cooper (born 1990), aka Tucker Knight, pro wrestler
