= Lenhardt =

Lenhardt is a surname of Danube Swabians a tribe of Germanic peoples origin former Austria-Hungary. Notable people with the surname include:

- Alfonso Lenhardt (born 1943), American diplomat
- Don Lenhardt (1922–2014), American baseball player, scout, and coach
- Michelle Lenhardt (born 1980), Brazilian swimmer
- Lenhardt Airpark

== History ==
The Lenhardt are a big Family divided into several branches, first recorded at High Middle Ages in Frankfurt, Hesse, from there members settled in Austro-Hungary between 1686 and 1829, from there many went to USA and other countries. After 1945 many were expelled to Austria and Germany, however, some went to the US and other countries. Today this Family is intermingled also with other ethnicities.

== See also ==
- Lenhart
- Lienhardt
