= Straßgang =

Coordinates: 47°01′30″N 15°24′28″E

Strassgang Straßgang
- 16th city district of Graz
- Interactive map of Strassgang
- Country: Austria
- Province: Styria
- Statutory city: Graz

Area
  - Total: 11.75 km^{2} (4.54 sq mi)

Population (2023)
  - Total: 20,095
  - Density: 1,710/km^{2} (4,429/sq mi)
- Postal codes: 8020, 8053, 8054, 8055

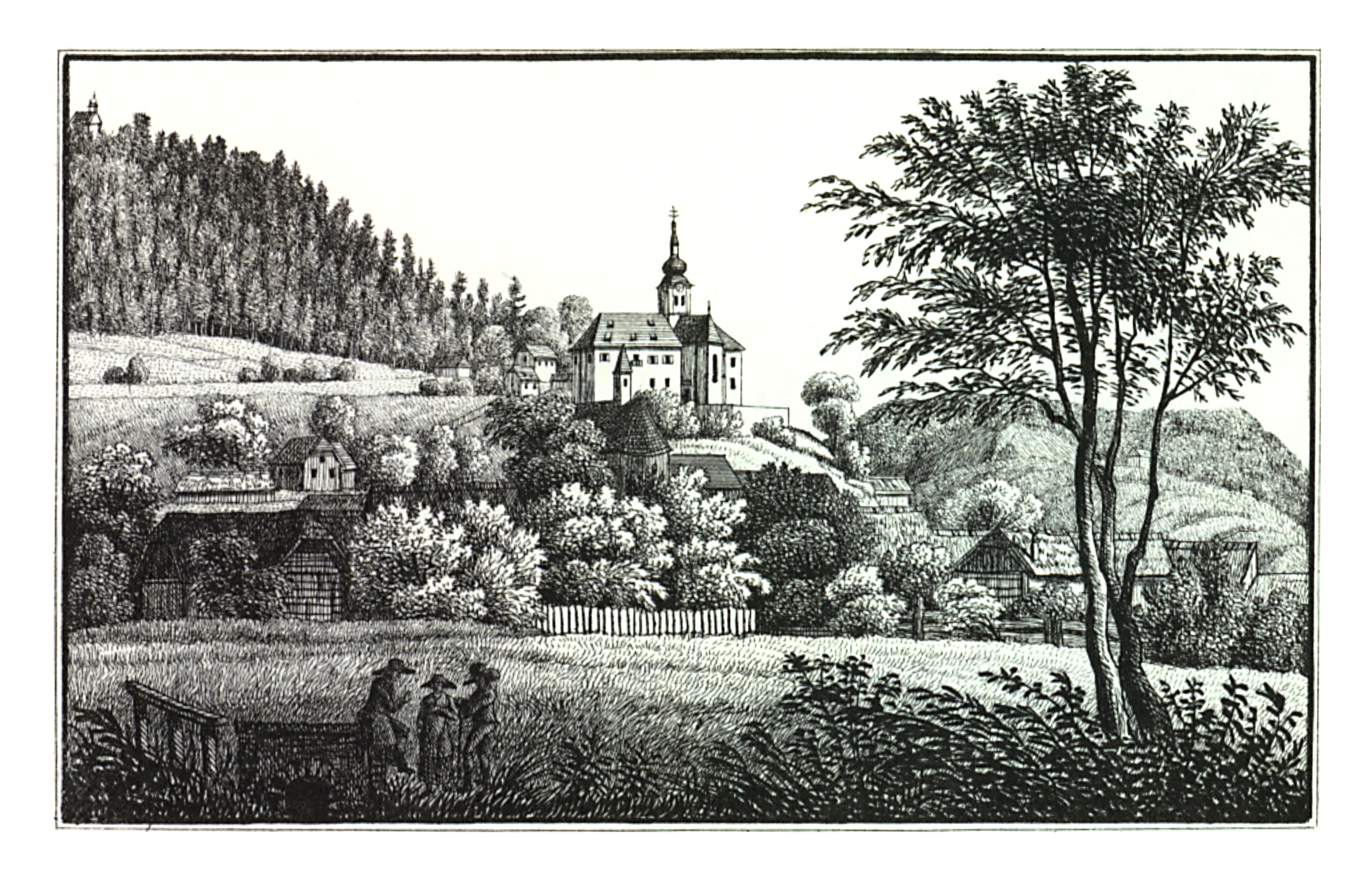
Straßgang with church of St. Florian, 1830, Lith. J.F. Kaiser, Graz

Straßgang (German: [ˈʃ͡tʁaːsˌgaŋ]; from Slavic straža "look-out, watchtower") is the 16th city district of Graz, in the Austrian province of Styria. It is located in the south-west of Graz at the bottom of the hills Buchkogel and Florianiberg.

== History ==
The locality Straßgang is situated along an old traffic route that is used since the Roman times. The village Straßgang together with the village Puntigam became the 16th city district of Graz in 1938. In 1988 Puntigam became the new 17th city district of Graz.

== Historic buildings ==
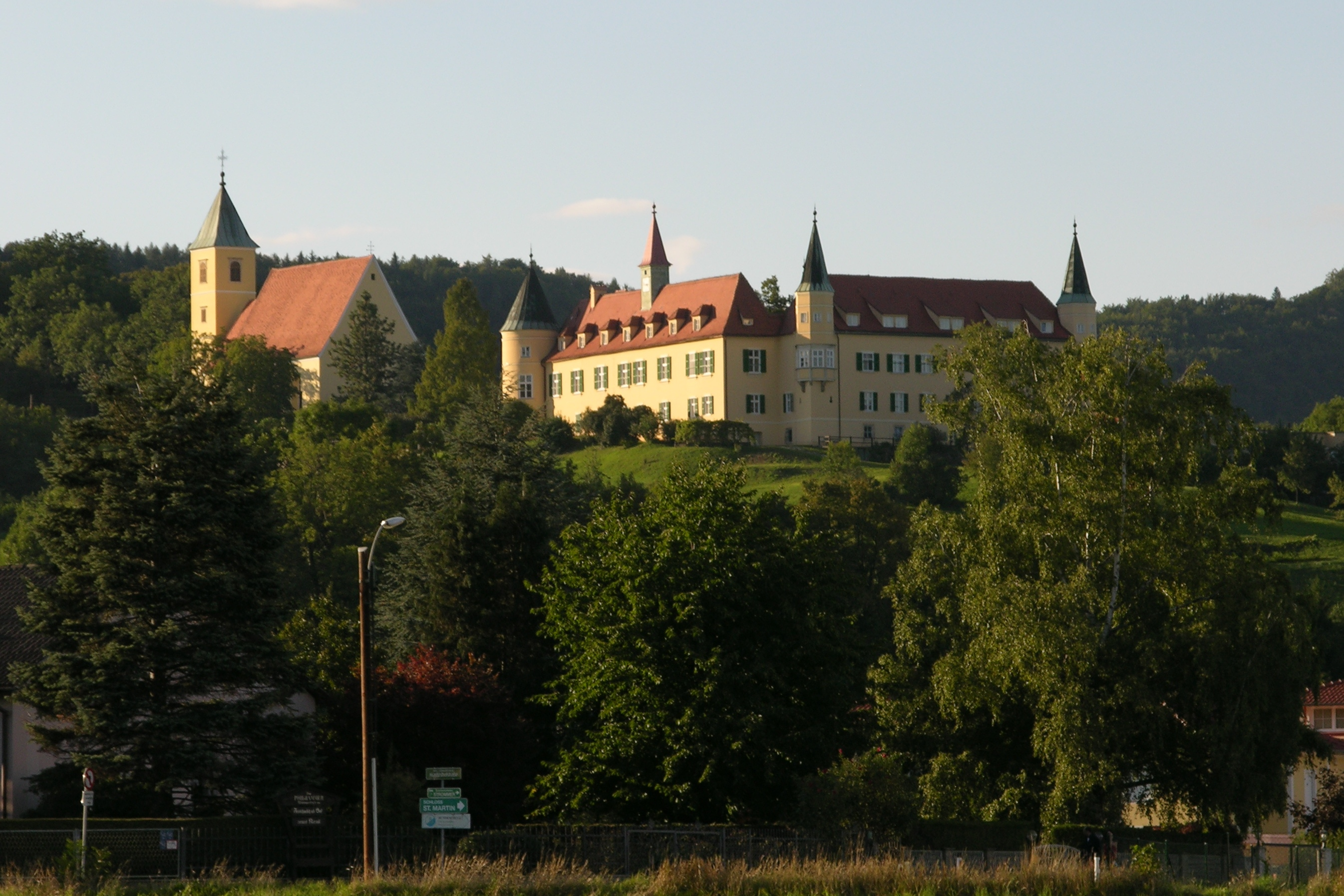
Church and Castle St. Martin in Graz, Strassgang in 2007.

Church Maria im Elend zu Straßgang is situated about 50 m above the center of the district.

The prominent Castle St. Martin is owned by the province of Styria since 1938. Church St. Florian erected in 1597. Church Rupertikirche first mentioned in 1354 but perhaps even erected in the 9th centura and therefore could be the oldest church in the area of Graz.

== Economy, schools and traffic ==
The district has several small industrial and commercial facilities e.g. a printing press. It has also some malls and psychiatric and neuropathic clinic Landesnervenklinik Sigmund Freud (LSF) which was erected in 1872 as "Irrenanstalt Am Feldhof". There is also the agricultural and forestry school Alt Grottenhof and a natural open air pool with a water surface of 11.000 m², natural gravel floor and big green areas.

As an important southwestern thoroughfare of the whole city there is the Kärntnerstraße, which along with the city highway, a part of the Pyhrn Autobahn (A9) motorway, are big traffic burdens of the district.

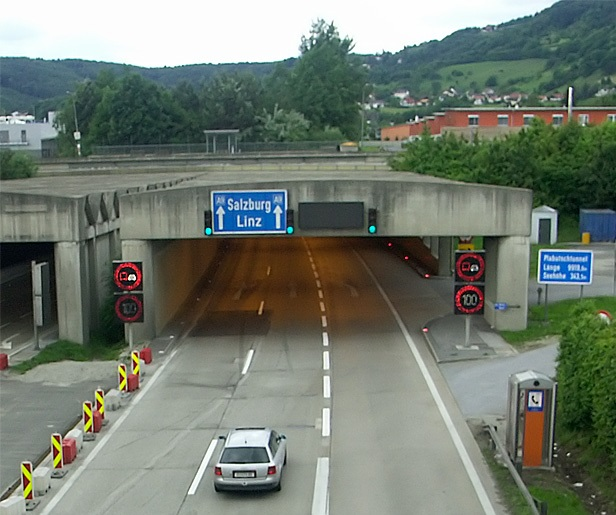
The Plabutschtunnel at the south portal.

As part of this the south portal of Plabutsch tunnel of the Pyhrn Autobahn was opened in 1987.

Today the Graz-Köflacher Railway is a fast means of transport to the city center of Graz as well as to western Styria. It was originally built for coal transport from the Köflach mining area. The city busses number 31, 32, 62 and 64 are also connecting the district and the rest of Graz.
