= Burglehn =

In medieval law in the Holy Roman Empire, the term Burglehn described two things:

1. The castle with all its accessories as a feud, which the king could give to a vassal.
2. A defined area outside the walls of a castle, where the houses of the burgmannen were found.

The burgmannnen were given these houses by their lords as part of their remuneration as well as a feud. The area of the burglehn and its inhabitants were under a special law. That is, they were neither subject to the territorial lord (Landesherr), nor to the town charter, not even if the burglehn was within the town walls. In law, they were subject to the holder of the castle.

Such houses were often also freihauses. There were frequent disputes between the people of the burglehn and the adjacent town, about whether the inhabitants of these houses could exercise crafts that were otherwise regulated by the town's guilds.

The burglehn began to be dissolved and placed under the local government in the 17th century. This process was completed in the 19th century. Some burglehns lasted much longer than the associated castles, which had often lost their military significance. Even today in some towns and cities a street name refers to the location of the former burglehns.
