= Dominium =

"Control" or "ownership" in Latin

Dominium means "dominion; control; ownership".

== Use in legal Latin ==
Latin: Dominium is used in some phrases and maxims in legal Latin:

- Dominium directum – Direct ownership, that is control of the property, but not necessarily with right to its utilization or alienation. For example, a holder in life tenure has dominium directum but not dominium utile, because he may control the property but not exhaust its resources. This is to be distinguished from allodial right or fee simple (dominium plenum) and the right retained by the grantor of the life estate who holds the rights to the utilization of the land's resources (dominium utile).
- Dominium directum et utile – The complete and absolute dominion in property; the union of the title and the exclusive use. Equivalent in nature to dominium plenum or fee simple.
- Dominium eminens – The right of eminent domain.
- Dominium non potest esse in pendenti. – Ownership cannot be held in suspense/pendency; property cannot float in an uncertainty.
- Dominium plenum – Full or complete ownership of an estate; "fee simple".
- Dominium utile – Beneficial ownership of an estate. A holder of the reversion of a life estate holds the dominium utile of the property (although not the control or dominium directum) because he has the right to the long-term utilization any resources (mineral, vegetative, etc.) on the property but not to the immediate use of the property–the holder of the life estate has control of the property.
- Dominium Utile autonomous holder - The autonomous holder of dominium utile represents a property framework developed by 12th-century jurists who split classical Roman unified ownership (dominium plenum) into formal bare legal title (dominium directum) and active beneficial economic ownership (dominium utile). Unlike traditional medieval vassals bound by personal oaths and feudal subjugation, an autonomous holder of dominium utile exercises independent control, directly captures all economic yields and appreciation, and maintains perpetual, heritable stewardship secure against arbitrary revocation.
- Duorum in solidum dominium vel possessio esse non potest – Sole ownership or possession cannot be in two persons.

In general, "utilization" of resources on the property is subject to a reasonableness test. A life tenant with dominium directum of an estate may make reasonable use of resources, which means roughly renewable or trivial usage: the culling of firewood in the midst of an expansive forest, or the extraction of coal sufficient for home use from a fecund mine. Any commercialization (e.g. selling rights to the coal shaft) or large-scale exploitation (raising extensive erections on the estate using the timber resources) will implicate the dominium utile reserved to the holder in reversion and be subject to legal action at common law.

== Use in Catholic theology ==
The concept of Latin: dominium was central to John Wyclif's political-theory concepts of divine and civil dominion.

== See also ==
- Heerlijkheid (Dutch)
- Usufruct (Latin)
