= Lenhardt Airpark =

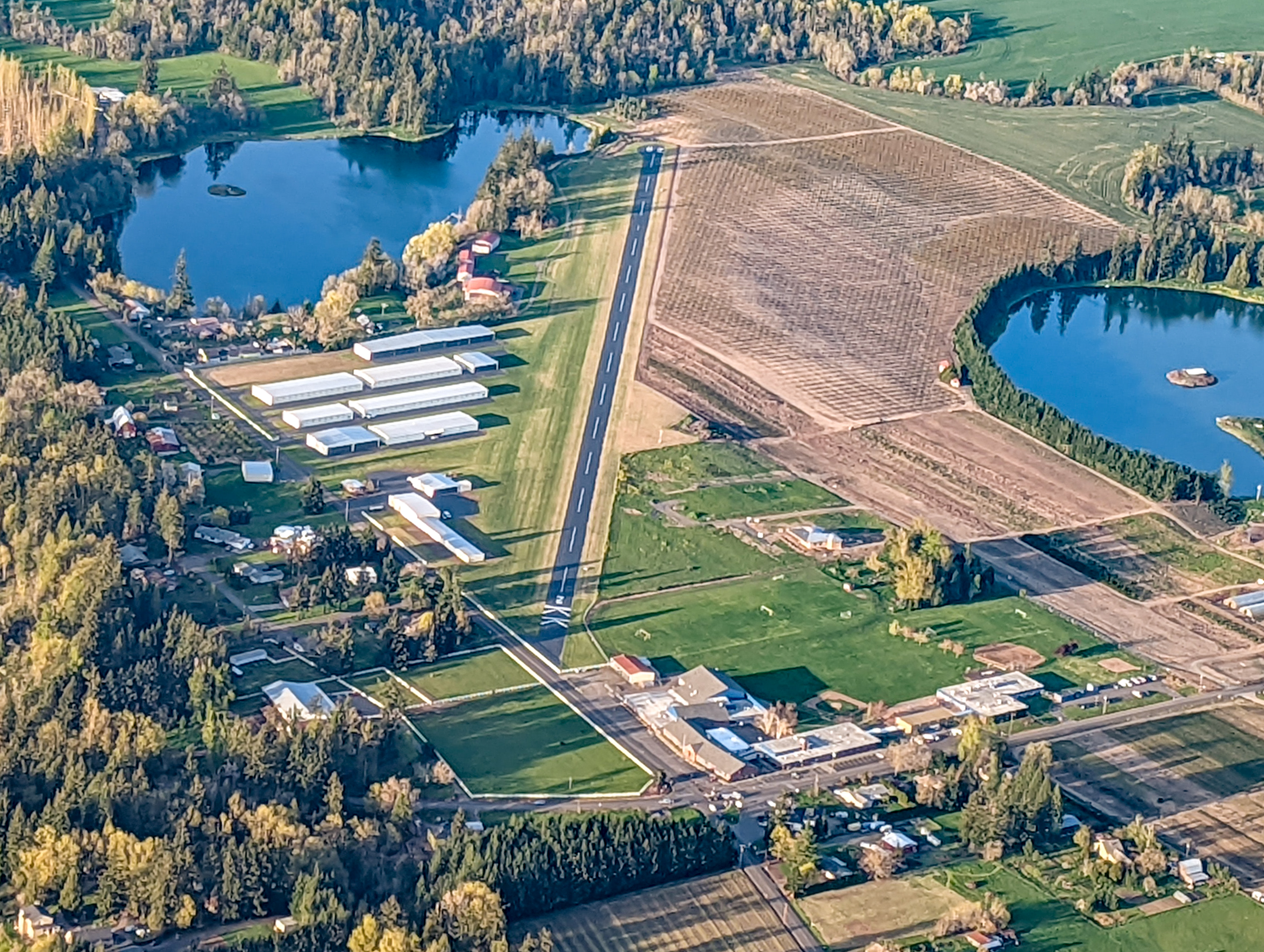
- IATA: none; ICAO: none; FAA LID: 7S9

Summary
- Airport type: Public
- Operator: Private owner
- Location: Hubbard, Oregon
- Elevation AMSL: 165 ft / 50 m
- Coordinates: 45°10′49.4340″N 122°44′36.33″W
- Website: http://www.airhaven.net/
- Interactive map of Lenhardt Airpark

Runways
Direction	Length		Surface
Direction	ft	m	Surface
2/20	2,956	901	Asphalt

Lenhardt Airpark (FAA LID: 7S9) is a privately owned, public use airport located 3 miles (4.8 km) east of Hubbard in Clackamas County, Oregon, United States.
