= Emblements =

Annual crops belonging to the tenant

In the common law, emblements are annual crops produced by cultivation legally belonging to the tenant with the implied right for its harvest, and are treated as the tenant's property.

The doctrine chiefly comes into play in the law of landlord and tenant, or in the foreclosure of mortgages and other legal situations that place the rights of another party in contention with those of a farmer who has planted a crop yet to be harvested. The doctrine also applies to the estate of a deceased tenant. In these situations, the doctrine of emblements operates to guarantee the farmer's right to reap and carry away the fruits of his labor even if he loses title to the land on which they are grown.

The right to emblements became less important in England in 1851, when most of its protections were established under the Landlord and Tenant Act 1851. Still, there are circumstances when the ancient right still holds, and any person entitled to emblements may enter upon the lands after the determination of the tenancy for the purpose of cutting and carrying away the crops.

In Scots law, the term is not used, but tenants have the equivalent rights.

== Related article(s) ==
- Fructus naturales
