= Sippe =

Kind of a kinship group

Sippe is German for "clan, kindred, extended family" (Frisian Sibbe, Norse Sifjar).

It continues a Proto-Germanic term *sebjō, which referred to a band or confederation bound by a treaty or oath, not primarily restricted to blood relations. The original character of sippe as a peace treaty is visible in Old English, e.g. in Beowulf (v. 1858):

hafast þû gefêred, þæt þâm folcum sceal,
Geáta leódum ond Gâr-Denum
sib gemæne ond sacu restan.

The Sippe came to be a cognatic, extended family unit, exactly analogous to the Scottish/Irish sept.

Most of the information left about the nature and role of the Sippe is found in records left by the Lombards, Alamanni, and Bavarians. One of the functions of the Sippe was regulating use of forests. The average Sippe likely contained no more than 50 families. The Sippe seems to have been absorbed into the monogamous family later on; P.D. King asserts that this was already the case among the Visigoths during the time of the Visigothic Kingdom.

== See also ==
- Band (anthropology)
- Consanguinity
- Germanic tribes
- Kinship
- List of Germanic peoples
- Mund (in law)
- Norse clans
- Sibling
- Sif, a Norse goddess thought to personify the concept
- Sippenhaft
