= Vassal =

Person aligned with a lord or monarch

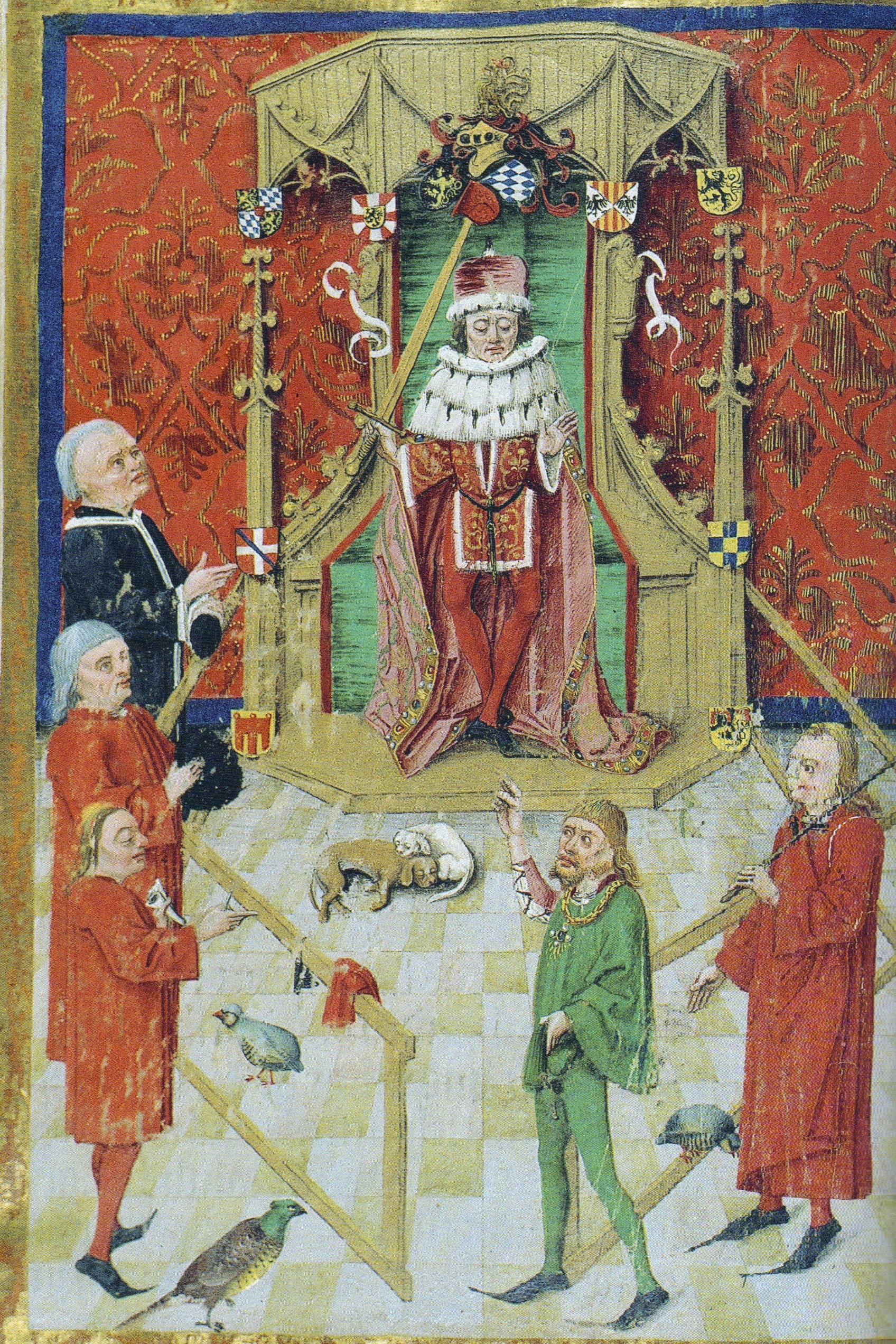
A vassal swears the oath of fealty before Count Palatine Frederick I of the Palatinate.

A vassal or liege subject is a ruler in a position of mutual obligation (subjection) to a superior lord or monarch, often in the context of the feudal system in medieval Europe and elsewhere. While the subordinate party is called a vassal, the superior party is called a suzerain. A vassal is semi-independent, meaning they can rule their country as they wished as long they met their obligations. The rights and obligations of a vassal is known as the vassalage. Whereas, the rights and obligations of a suzerain is called the suzerainty. The obligations of a vassal often include paying tribute or providing military support with knights. In exchange, the vassal got certain privileges, such as commerce, military protection, and land held as a tenant or fief.

In contrast, fealty (fidelitas) is sworn, unconditional loyalty to a monarch.

== European vassalage ==
In fully developed vassalage, the lord and the vassal would take part in a commendation ceremony composed of two parts, the homage and the fealty, including the use of Christian sacraments to show its sacred importance. According to Eginhard's brief description, the commendatio made to Pippin the Younger in 757 by Tassilo III, Duke of Bavaria, involved the relics of Saints Denis, Rusticus, Éleuthère, Martin, and Germain – apparently assembled at Compiegne for the event. Such refinements were not included from the outset when it was time of crisis, war, hunger, etc. Under feudalism, those who were weakest needed the protection of the knights who owned the weapons and knew how to fight.

Feudal society was increasingly based on the concept of "lordship" (French seigneur), which was one of the distinguishing features of the Early Middle Ages and had evolved from times of Late Antiquity. (Note: The Tours formulary, which a mutual contract of rural patronage, offered parallels; it was probably derived from Late Antique Gallo-Roman precedents, according to Magnou-Nortier 1975.)

In the time of Charlemagne (ruled 768–814), the connection slowly developed between vassalage and the grant of land, the main form of wealth at that time. Contemporaneous social developments included agricultural "manorialism" and the social and legal structures labelled — but only since the 18th century — "feudalism". These developments proceeded at different rates in various regions. In Merovingian times (5th century to 752), monarchs would reward only the greatest and most trusted vassals with lands. Even at the most extreme devolution of any remnants of central power, in 10th-century France, the majority of vassals still had no fixed estates.

The stratification of a fighting band of vassals into distinct groups might roughly correlate with the new term "fief" that had started to supersede "benefice" in the 9th century. An "upper" group comprised great territorial magnates, who were strong enough to ensure the inheritance of their benefice to the heirs of their family. A "lower" group consisted of landless knights attached to a count or duke. This social settling process also received impetus in fundamental changes in the conduct of warfare. As co-ordinated cavalry superseded disorganized infantry, armies became more expensive to maintain. A vassal needed economic resources to equip the cavalry he was bound to contribute to his lord to fight his frequent wars. Such resources, in the absence of a money economy, came only from land and its associated assets, which included peasants as well as wood and water.

== See also ==
- Feudalism in the Holy Roman Empire
- Freeborn
- Lehnsmann
- Mandala (political model)
- Suzerainty
- Thegn
- Vavasour, a type of vassal
- Zamindar
- Multiple vassalage

=== Similar terms ===
- Gokenin, vassals of the shogunate in Japan
- Manrent, Scottish Clan treaties of offensive and defensive alliance
- Nöken (plural: nöker) was the Mongol term for a tribal leader acknowledging another as his liege
- Villein, a serf, or low-born worker under feudalism
