= Fructus naturales =

In property law, fructus naturales are the natural fruits of the land on which they arise, such as the produce from old roots (pasturage) and uncultivated plants (e.g. timber and fruit), and wild game. In many common law legal systems, fructus naturales are considered to be part of the real property, and not separate chattels in relation to any legal conveyance of the property.

This term originates from the term fructus naturales used in the Roman law.

== See also ==
- Emblements
