= Freihaus =

House in town walls but legally outside

A Freihaus (German for "free house") was a house that, although physically within the city walls of a medieval or early modern city, was legally outside it. That is, the residents of a Freihaus legally lived in the surrounding countryside and were outside the jurisdiction of the town court (they had the right to be tried before the regional court or Landgericht) and were exempt from municipal taxes. In addition to the nobility, religious institutions often had such privileged houses in urban areas.

A freihaus was often awarded as a fief; rarely they were allodial property of their owner. They were often part of a Burglehn quarter, in which the nobility among the defenders of a fortress were housed. However, it was also possible that the Prince privileged individual house sites in a city, and exempted them from the city's charter. There were often controversies between the owners of the freihaus and the city where they were located over the question if urban crafts could legally be practised in these houses, and if so, whether they were subject to the rules of the city guilds.

== See also ==
- Charter
- Fee
- Feu
- Jurydyka
- History of Germany
