= Burgmann =

Historical word for a specific job on a castle

From the 12th century in central Europe, a Burgmann (plural: Burgmannen or modern term Burgmänner, Latin: oppidanus, castrensus) was a knight ministeriales or member of the nobility who was obliged to guard and defend castles. The role is roughly equivalent to the English castellan and the name derives from the German word for castle, Burg. A Burgmann was subordinate to the lord of the castle and was provided with a residence, known as a Burgmannshof, within or near the castle. The system declined with the introduction of non-aristocratic soldiers and mercenaries in the late Middle Ages.

== Function ==
Whether a Burgmann was a free knight, dienstmann or ministerialis, he was a member of the aristocracy who was charged by the Burgrave or lord of the castle (the Burgherr) with the so-called Burghut or castle-guard. In other words, his job was to guard the castle and defend it in case of attack. A fief had to be defended from incursion and the supporting farmland had to be run correctly, proper repairs and improvements had to be made, possibly fortifying key points and collecting taxes. Ministeriales replaced free nobles as castellans under Conrad I of Abensberg's tenure as Archbishop of Salzburg from 1106 to 1147. In 1131, Hohensalzburg saw its first ministerialis, Henry of Seekirchen, sit as both burgmann and burgrave, overseeing a permanent garrison of subordinate (free) knights.

Originally the Burgmann was paid in kind for his service although he had to provide his own armour. Later, he was given a so-called Burglehn as a remuneration which, from the late 13th century, was a fixed sum of money. From the 13th century on, the rights and duties of the Burgmann could be found to be governed by a written contract, the Burgmannvertrag. In addition to the place and times that a Burgmann had to be present at the castle, it laid down the necessary armament and equipment. The duty to be present - called residence duty (Residenzpflicht) - required the lord of the castle to provide his Burgmänner with a residence free of charge within the castle or at least in its immediate vicinity. Such residences were referred to as the Burgmann's residence (Burgmannsitz), estate (Burggut) or court/farm Burgmannshof.

Many had judicial powers to govern, as in 1111, when the Salzburg burgmann caught a ministerial who fomented armed rebellion - he had the offender blinded for his temerity.

Sometimes several Burgmänner would be resident at one castle and, together, they made up the Burgmannschaft. They were subordinate to the Burgherr or to a castle commandant (Burgkommandant) commissioned by him, who frequently bore the title, burgrave (Burggraf). Because the Burgmann was subject to feudal law (Lehnsrecht), legal disputes involving feudal matters were handled by the burgrave. The noblemen of the Burgmannschaft were often supported in their work by common staff such as gatekeepers (Torwarte) and watchmen (Türmer).

== Decline of use ==
The residence requirement of the Burgmannen was superseded by the introduction of armed servants or Knechte. With the introduction of such non-aristocratic castle contingents and the move from castles to fortifications in the late Middle Ages, the Burgmann system disappeared, and the Burghut was discharged by Kriegsknechte and mercenaries.

== See also ==
- German nobility
- German comital titles

== Literature ==
- Arnold, Benjamin. German Knighthood 1050-1300. Oxford: Oxford University Press, 1985.
- Freed, John B. "Nobles, Ministerials and Knights in the Archdiocese of Salzburg" Speculum 62:3 (July 1987) pp. 575–611
- Freed, John B. Noble Bondsmen: Ministerial Marriages in the Archdiocese of Salzburg, 1100-1343 (Ithaca, NY: Cornell University Press, 1995).
- Horst Wolfgang Böhme, Reinhard Friedrich, Barbara Schock-Werner (ed.): Wörterbuch der Burgen, Schlösser und Festungen. Philipp Reclam, Stuttgart, 2004, ISBN 3-15-010547-1, pp. 100–101.
- Lexikon des Mittelalters. Vol 2. dtv, Munich, 2002, ISBN 3-423-59057-2, col. 965–966, 1055.
