= Leiben =

- Municipality
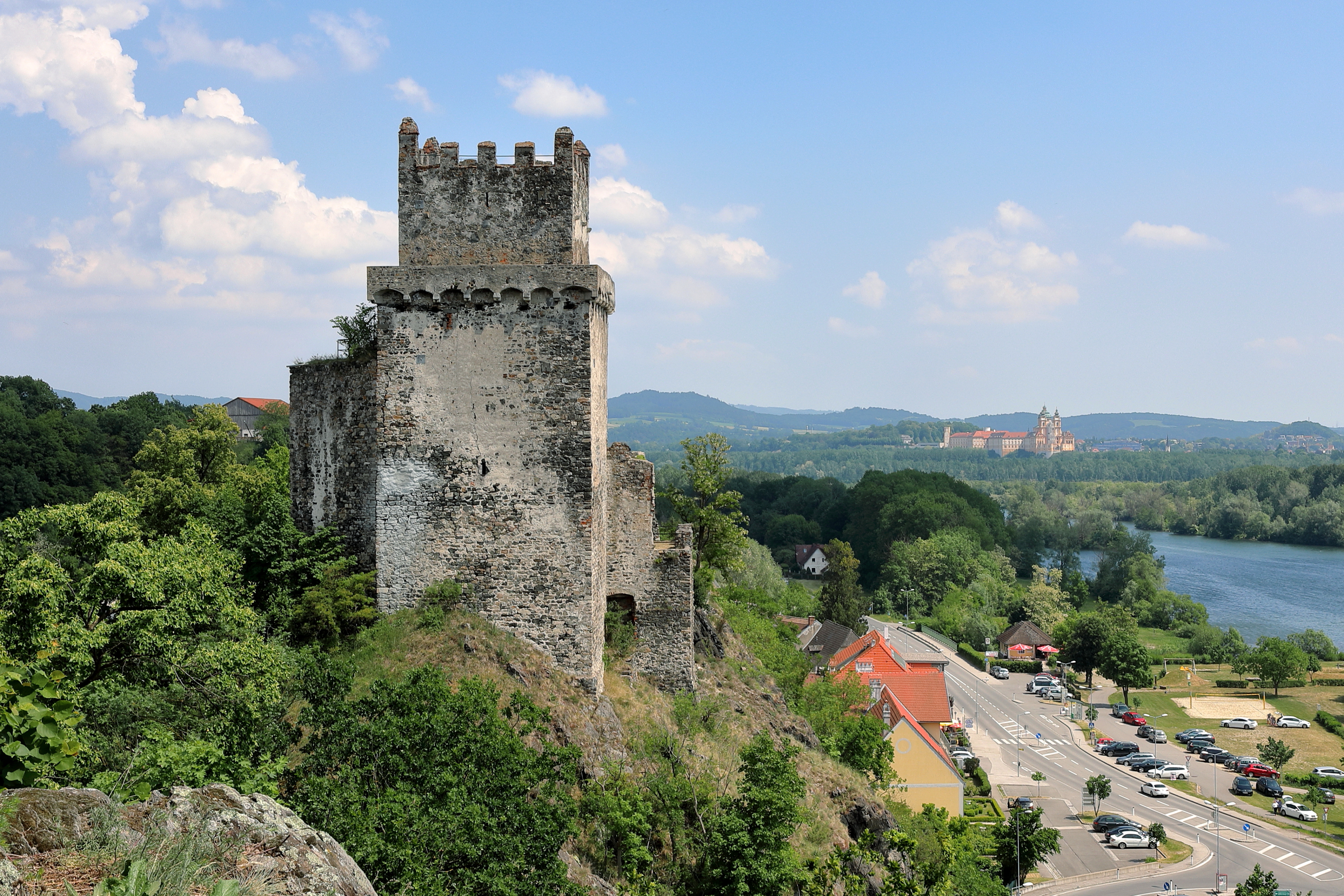
- Weitenegg ruins in Leiben

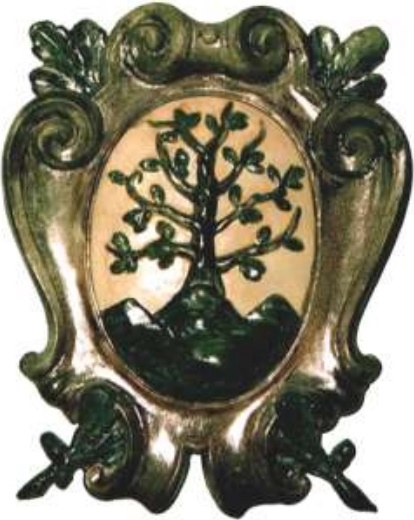
- Coat of arms

- Location within Austria
- Coordinates: 48°15′N 15°16′E
- Country: Austria
- State: Lower Austria
- District: Melk

Government
  - Mayor: Karl-Heinz Spring

Area
  - Total: 12.53 km^{2} (4.84 sq mi)
- Elevation: 285 m (935 ft)

Population (2018-01-01)
  - Total: 1,362
  - Density: 108.7/km^{2} (281.5/sq mi)
- Time zone: UTC+1 (CET)
  - Summer (DST): UTC+2 (CEST)
- Postal code: 3652
- Area code: 02752
- Website: www.leiben.at

Leiben is a town in the district of Melk in the Austrian state of Lower Austria.

== Population ==
Historical population
Year	Pop.	±%
1971	1,264	—
1981	1,304	+3.2%
1991	1,344	+3.1%
2001	1,289	−4.1%
