= Fief =

Right granted by overlord to vassal, central element of feudalism

A fief (/fiːf/, FEEF; Latin: feudum) was a central element in medieval contracts based on feudal law. It consisted of a form of property holding or other rights granted by an overlord to a vassal, who held it in fealty or "in fee" in return for a form of feudal allegiance, services or payments. The fees were often lands, land revenue or revenue-producing real property like a watermill, held in feudal land tenure: these are typically known as fiefs or fiefdoms. However, not only land but anything of value could be held in fee, including governmental office, rights of exploitation such as hunting, fishing or felling trees, monopolies in trade, money rents and tax farms. There never existed a standard feudal system, nor did there exist only one type of fief. Over the ages, depending on the region, there was a broad variety of customs using the same basic legal principles in many variations.

== Terminology ==
In ancient Rome, a "benefice" (from the Latin noun beneficium, meaning "benefit") was a gift of land (precaria) for life as a reward for services rendered, originally, to the state. In medieval Latin European documents, a land grant in exchange for service continued to be called a beneficium (Latin). Later, the term feudum, or feodum, replaced beneficium in the documents. The first attested instance of this is from 984, although more primitive forms were seen up to one hundred years earlier. The origin of the feudum and why it replaced beneficium has not been well established, but there are multiple theories, described below.

The most widely held theory is put forth by Marc Bloch that it is related to the Frankish term *fehu-ôd, in which *fehu means "cattle" and -ôd means "goods", implying "a moveable object of value". When land replaced currency as the primary store of value, the Germanic word *fehu-ôd replaced the Latin word beneficium. This Germanic origin theory was also shared by William Stubbs in the 19th century.

A theory put forward by Archibald R. Lewis is that the origin of 'fief' is not feudum (or feodum), but rather foderum, the earliest attested use being in Astronomus's Vita Hludovici (840). In that text is a passage about Louis the Pious which says "annona militaris quas vulgo foderum vocant", which can be translated as "(Louis forbade that) military provender which they popularly call 'fodder' (be furnished)."

In the 10th and 11th centuries the Latin terms for 'fee' could be used either to describe dependent tenure held by a man from his lord, as the term is used now by historians, or it could mean simply "property" (the manor was, in effect, a small fief). It lacked a precise meaning until the middle of the 12th century, when it received formal definition from land lawyers.

In Old French, the terms feu, fie are found from the 11th century, developing into fief from the middle of the 13th century; the second f in fief may be due to influence from the verb fiever 'to grant in fee'. In English usage, the word fee is first attested in Middle English around 1250–1300, and feu remains the usual form in Scotland. The form fief entered English around 1605–1615. In French, one also finds seigneurie (land and rights possessed by a seigneur or "lord", 12th century), which gives rise to the expression "seigneurial system" to describe feudalism.

== Early feudal grants ==
Originally, vassalage did not imply the giving or receiving of landholdings (which were granted only as a reward for loyalty), but by the 8th century the giving of a landholding was becoming standard. The granting of a landholding to a vassal did not relinquish the lord's property rights, but only the use of the lands and their income; the granting lord retained ultimate ownership of the fee and could, technically, recover the lands in case of disloyalty or death. In Francia, Charles Martel was the first to make large-scale and systematic use (the practice had remained sporadic until then) of the remuneration of vassals by the concession of the usufruct of lands (a beneficatium or "benefice" in the documents) for the life of the vassal, or, sometimes extending to the second or third generation.

By the middle of the 10th century, fee had largely become hereditary. The eldest son of a deceased vassal would inherit, but first he had to do homage and fealty to the lord and pay a "relief" for the land (a monetary recognition of the lord's continuing proprietary rights over the property).

Historically, the fees of the 11th and the 12th century derived from two separate sources. The first was land carved out of the estates of the upper nobility. The second source was allodial land transformed into dependent tenures. During the 10th century in northern France and the 11th century in France south of the Loire, local magnates either recruited or forced the owners of allodial holdings into dependent relationships and they were turned into fiefs. The process occurred later in Germany, and was still going on in the 13th century.

In England, Henry II transformed them into important sources of royal income and patronage. The discontent of barons with royal claims to arbitrarily assessed "reliefs" and other feudal payments under Henry's son King John resulted in Magna Carta of 1215.

Eventually, great feudal lords sought also to seize governmental and legal authority (the collection of taxes, the right of high justice, etc.) in their lands, and some passed these rights to their own vassals.

The privilege of minting official coins developed into the concept of seigniorage.

== Later feudal grants and knightly service ==
In 13th-century Germany, Italy, England, France, and Spain the term "feodum" was used to describe a dependent tenure held from a lord by a vassal in return for a specified amount of knight service and occasional financial payments (feudal incidents).

However, knight service in war was far less common than:

- castle-guard (called Burghut in the Holy Roman Empire), the obligation of a vassal to serve in a castle garrison of the lord;
- suit in court, the vassal's obligation to attend the lord's court, to give him counsel, and to help him judge disputes;
- attendance in the lord's entourage, accompanying the lord when he travelled or attended the court of his lord so as to increase the social status of the lord;
- hospitality to the lord or to his servants (accommodation).

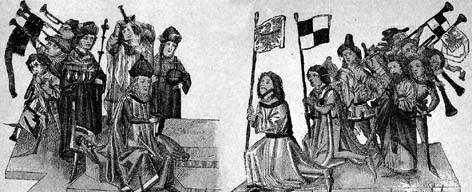
Sigismund fees the Margraviate of Brandenburg to Frederick, April 30, 1415

A lord in late 12th-century England and France could also claim the right of:

- wardship and marriage – right to control descent of fee by choosing a husband for a female heir and a guardian for minors (preferably in consultation with the heir's closest male adult kinsmen);
- "aids" – payments to aid the lord in times of need (customarily given to the lord to cover the cost of knighting the eldest son, marriage of the eldest daughter, and for ransoming the lord if required);
- escheat – the reversion of the fief to the lord in default of an heir.

In northern France in the 12th and 13th centuries, military service for fiefs was limited for offensive campaigns to 40 days for a knight. By the 12th century, English and French kings and barons began to commute military service for cash payments (scutages), with which they could purchase the service of mercenaries.

== Feudal registers ==
A list of several hundred such fees held in chief between 1198 and 1292, along with their holders' names and form of tenure, was published in three volumes between 1920 and 1931 and is known as The Book of Fees; it was developed from the 1302 Testa de Nevill.

== The fiefs of Guernsey ==
The Bailiwick of Guernsey is a group of several of the Channel Islands that is a Crown Dependency. Guernsey still has feudal law and legal fiefs in existence today. Each fief has a Seigneur or Dame that owns the fief. The Guernsey fiefs and seigneurs existed long before baronies, and are historically part of Normandy. While nobility has been outlawed in France and Germany, noble fiefs still exist by law in Guernsey. The owners of the fiefs actually convene each year at the Court of Chief Pleas under the supervision of His Majesty's Government. There are approximately 24 private fiefs in Guernsey that are registered directly with the Crown. In 2024, King Charles visited with the Seigneurs of the Fiefs who hold their feudal titles direct from the King and Royal Courts.

== See also ==
- Appanage, part of the liege's domain granted to a junior relative
- Book of Fees, a scholarly collection of fiefs
- Brahmadeya, a royal fief given to a Brahmin for service to an Indian king.
- Enfeoffment
- Fee simple
- Fee tail
- Fengjian, the Chinese system often compared to European feudalism
- Feoffee
- Feudal land tenure in England
- Lehen (disambiguation), the German equivalent
- Knight-service
- Knight's fee
- Lord of the manor
- Sasan (land grant), a royal fief given to the Charanas by an Indian ruler.
- Seigneurial system of New France, a semifeudal system in France's American colonies
- Subinfeudation
- Urbarium, a medieval record of fees
