= List of lordships =

This is an incomplete attempt at an exhaustive list of lordships.

== List of lordships ==
| Name | Period | Notes |
|---|---|---|
| Lordship of Wilmington | 700–present | Is an Anglo-Saxon Lordship in Kent, England which has some of the earliest surviving Anglo-Saxon charters |
| Lordship of Gedern | 780–1819 | Was a lordship in the Holy Roman Empire and is roughly in the modern state of Hesse in Germany |
| Lordship of the Isles | 875–present | |
| Lordship of Mechelen | 910–1795 | |
| Lordship of Schellenberg | 9th century – 1719 | Was a lordship within the Holy Roman Empire and united with the County of Vaduz to form the Principality of Liechtenstein |
| Lordship of Wickrath | 971–1502 | |
| Lordship of Montpellier | 985–1349 | |
| Lordship of Hummel | 995–1598 | |
| Lordship of L'Isle-Jourdain | 1000–1421 | Was a lordship in Gascony, France in the High Middle Ages |
| Lordship of Biscay | c. 1040–1876 | |
| Lordship of the Isle of Wight | 1066–1488 | Was a lordship on the Isle of Wight created by William the Conqueror |
| Lordship of Diepholz | 1070–1482 | |
| Lordship of Heinsberg | 1085–1484 | |
| Lordship of Brecknock | 1088–1535 | Was a Welsh Marcher Lordship also known as the Lordship of Brecon |
| Lordship of Bowland | 1090s–present | |
| Lordship of Glamorgan | 1091–1536 | Was a powerful Welsh Marcher Lordship, based at Cardiff Castle |
| Lordship of Broich | 1093–1806 | |
| Lordship of Ramla | 1099–1247 | |
| Lordship of Cameros | 11th century – 1277 | |
| Lordship of Haifa | 1100–1187 | |
| Lordship of Marash | 1104–1149 | Was a crusader lordship in Cilicia |
| Lordship of Toron | 1107–1167 | |
| Lordship of Sidon | 1110–1268 | The Lordship of Sidon was one of the four major fiefdoms inside the Kingdom of Jerusalem |
| Lordship of Caesarea | 1110–1266 | |
| Lordship of Beirut | 1110–1291 | Was a crusader lordship within the kingdom of Jerusalem |
| Lordship of Liddesdale | 1113–present | Was a lordship in Scotland until it was annexed by the Crown of Scotland in 1540 |
| Lordship of Botrun | 1115–1289 | Was a fief within the County of Tripoli |
| Lordship of Nazareth | 1115–? | Was a crusader lordship under the Principality of Galilee |
| Lordship of Gower | 1116–1536 | |
| Lordship of Oultrejordain | 1118–1187 | Was one of the major crusader lordships of the Kingdom of Jerusalem, the region it encompasses is equal to the modern region of Transjordan |
| Lordship of Bethsan | 1120–1187 | Was a crusader lordship within the kingdom of Jerusalem |
| Lordship of Nablus | 1120–1187 | Was a crusader lordship within the kingdom of Jerusalem |
| Lordship of Annandale | 1124–1536 | Was a lordship in Scotland, would last until 1536 when it was acquired by the crown of Scotland |
| Lordship of Banias | 1128–1164 | Was a crusader lordship within the kingdom of Jerusalem |
| Lordship of Mirabel | 1134–1187 | Was a crusader lordship within the Kingdom of Jerusalem |
| Lordship of Ibelin | 1141–1187 | Was a crusader lordship within the Kingdom of Jerusalem |
| Lordship of Hebron | 1149–1161 | Was a crusader lordship within the Kingdom of Jerusalem |
| Lordship of Oñate | 1149–1845 | Was a Basque Lordship surrounding the town of Oñate under the Kingdom of Navarre and later the Kingdom of Castile |
| Lordship of Myllendonk | 1166–1700 | |
| Lordship of Blanchegarde | 1166–? | Was a crusader lordship within the Kingdom of Jerusalem |
| Lordship of Albarracín | 1167–1300 | |
| Lordship of Anholt | 1169–1802 | |
| Lordship of Meath | 1172–1240 | |
| Lordship of Ireland | 1177–1542 | Was lordship in Ireland comprising the areas under control of the Kingdom of England |
| Lordship of Caymont | 1191–1193 | Was a crusader lordship within the kingdom of Jerusalem |
| Lordship of Reipoltskirchen | 1198–1806 | |
| Lordship of Argyll | 12th century – ? | |
| Lordship of Léon | 12th century – 16th century | |
| Lordship of Galloway | 12th century | Lordship of Galloway was an autonomous lordship in Scotland that went from being the kingdom of Galloway until the death of Fergus of Galloway in 1161 after which Galloway became a vassal of the Scottish crown and was later incorporated into the Kingdom of Scotland as a lordship. |
| Heeze, Leende en Zesgehuchten | 12th Century - 1810 | |
| Lordship of Saint-Martin-du-Chêne | 12th Century - 1798 | A Lordship in Switzerland |
| Lordship of Demotika | 1204–1205 | Was a crusader lordship founded in Thrace after the Fourth Crusade |
| Lordship of Salona | 1205–1210, 1212–1394, 1404–1410 | Was a Crusader Lordship created after the Fourth Crusade |
| Lordship of Argos and Nauplia | 1212–1388 | Was a lordship within the Frankish-ruled Morea in southern Greece |
| Lordship of Ruppin | 1214–1524 | |
| Lordship of Rostock | 1226–1323 | Was a state within the Holy Roman Empire |
| Lordship of Parchim-Richenberg | 1226–1255 | |
| Lordship of Stargard | 1236–1918 | |
| Lordship of Torre de Canals | 1244–? | Was a lordship within the Kingdom of Valencia (Crown of Aragon) |
| Lordship of Tyre | 1246–1291 | |
| Lordship of Villena | 1250s–? | |
| Lordship of Phocaea | 1275–1340 | |
| Lordship of Homburg | 1276 – 1806 | |
| Lordship of Andorra | 1278 – 1715 | Was a co-lordship within the Principality of Catalonia (Crown of Aragon) |
| Lordship of Bromfield and Yale | 1282–1536 | Was a medieval Marcher Lordship in Wales |
| Lordship of Denbigh | 1284–1461 | |
| Lordship of Hanau | 13th century – 1429 | |
| Lordship of the Glens | 13th century - ? | Was a lordship comprising the Glens of Antrim, held by the Bissett family before later coming under possession of the MacDonnell of Antrim |
| Lordship of Sinoutskerke and Baarsdorp | 13th century – present | |
| Lordship of Franckenstein | 13th century – 1662 | |
| Lordship of Chios | 1304–1329 | Was Genoese lordship in Byzantine territory |
| Lordship of Prilep | 1371–1395 | Was a successor state to the Serbian Empire |
| Lordship of Paros | 1389–1537 | Was a lordship within the Duchy of the Archipelago |
| Lordship of Harviala | 1396–? | Was a lordship in Finland that existed under Swedish rule |
| Lordship of Lorne | 14th century – present | |
| Lordship of Molahiffe | 14th century – 1824 | |
| Lordship of Coshmaing | 14th century – ? | Was a lordship in Ireland in modern-day region of Munster |
| Lordship of Purmerend, Purmerland and Ilpendam | 1410–1572, 1618–1923 | |
| Lordship of Ameland | 1424–1795 | |
| Lordship and Barony of Hailes | 1451–present | |
| Lordship of Winneburg and Beilstein | 1488–1801 | was a lordship within the Holy Roman Empire |
| Lordship of Frisia | 1498–1795 | |
| Lordship of Utrecht | 1528–1795 | |
| Lordship of Overijssel | 1528–1798 | |
| Lordship of Groningen | 1536–1594 | |
| Lordship of Kniphausen | 1588 - 1854 | |
| Lordship and Barony of Balvaird | 1624–present | |
| Lordship of Sainte-Anne-de-la-Pérade | 1627–1854 | Was a lordship in New France along the north shore of the St. Lawrence River |
| Lordship of Batiscan | 1636–1854 | Was a lordship in New France that was granted to the Jesuits in 1639 |
| Lordship of Champlain | 1644–1854 | Was a lordship in New France that lasted until the end of the feudal system |
| Lordship of Eglofs | Late Middle Ages – 1806 | Was a lordship within the Holy Roman Empire and it would gain Imperial immediacy in 1668 |
| Lordship of Lac-des-Deux-Montagnes | 1717–1840s | |
| Lordship of Vukovar | 1731–1945 | |
| Lordship of Ilok and Upper Syrmia | 1697–1944 | |
| Lordship of Lydiate | ?–present | Is a lordship in Merseyside England |
| Lordship of Newry | ?–present | Is a barony in Northern Ireland |
