= Ulmus minor 'Dijkwel' =

Elm cultivar

- Species: Ulmus minor
- Cultivar: 'Dijkwel'
- Origin: Netherlands

The Field Elm cultivar Ulmus minor 'Dijkwel' was first described in the Van't Westeinde Catalogue 27, p. 28, 1957-58.

== Description ==
Described as resembling 'Schuurhoek' but with slightly larger, brighter leaves. Difficult to propagate from cuttings, the cultivar was noted as being free from frostcracks.

== Cultivation ==
Production of 'Dijkwel' by the Van't Westeinde nursery (now 'Kwekerij Westhof') ceased in 1965; no living trees are known but one dead specimen still stood (2008) in the vicinity of the village of 's-Heer Abtskerke in the Zeeland province of the Netherlands.
