= Lordship =

Feudal unit ruled by a lord

A lordship is a territory held by a lord. It was a landed estate that served as the lowest administrative and judicial unit in rural areas. It originated as a unit under the feudal system during the Middle Ages. In a lordship, the functions of economic and legal management are assigned to a lord, who, at the same time, is not endowed with indispensable rights and duties of the sovereign. A Lordship in its essence is clearly different from the fief and, along with the allod, is one of the ways to exercise the right.

Nulle terre sans seigneur ("No land without a lord") was a feudal legal maxim; where no other lord can be discovered, the Crown is lord as lord paramount. The principal incidents of a seignory were a feudal oath of homage and fealty; a "quit" or "chief" rent; a "relief" of one year's quit rent, and the right of escheat. In return for these privileges the lord was liable to forfeit his rights if he neglected to protect and defend the tenant or did anything injurious to the feudal relation.

In England, every seignory now existing must have been created before the statute Quia Emptores (1290), which forbade the future creation of estates in fee-simple by subinfeudation. The only seignories of any importance at present are the lordships of manors. They are regarded as incorporeal hereditaments, and are either appendant or in gross. A seignory appendant passes with the grant of the manor; a seignory in gross—that is, a seignory which has been severed from the demesne lands of the manor to which it was originally appendant—must be specially conveyed by deed of grant.

Freehold land may be enfranchised by a conveyance of the seignory to the freehold tenant, but it does not extinguish the tenant's right of common (Baring v. Abingdon, 1892, 2 Ch. 374). By s. 3 (ii.) of the Settled Land Act 1882, the tenant for life of a manor is empowered to sell the seignory of any freehold land within the manor, and by s. 21 (v.) the purchase of the seignory of any part of settled land being freehold land, is an authorized application of capital money arising under the act.

== Feudal origins ==
The lordships came into being as a result of the feudal system, in particular the sovereign's delegated judicial prerogative. The crown, as lord paramount, granted the right to govern and to exercise judicial authority to a crown vassal, often a confidant or as a reward for military service or political support. The crown vassal—e.g. a count or duke — thus exercised all or part of the sovereign's royal authority. In turn the crown vassal granted rights to the mesne lords.

Because a fief originated out of a bond between vassal and lord for military service, vassalage was personal not heritable. With the advent of professional armies, the vassalage bond fell into disuse or was replaced by scutage; however, vassalage remained personal. One of the consequences of this was that, on the death of the vassal, the fief escheated to the lord. The vassal's heir was able to retain the heerlijkheid through the commendation ceremony, the process of paying homage and swearing fealty officiated at the head manor court. The new vassal made a symbolic payment to his lord. The same ceremony was held when a manor was sold. If there was no direct descendant, other blood relatives could exercise their right of laudatio parentum, which grants them a right of first refusal and explains how lordships were able to be kept in the same families for centuries.

== Manorial rights ==
The tenancy of a lordship is not to be confused with land ownership. It was an estate in land, not land per se. Although lords of the manor generally owned property within a lordship (often substantial amounts), it was possible for a lord not to own any property at all within his own lordship. Also, when agricultural land was held by a lord in the Low Countries, the amount held was smaller in comparison to other countries.

Lordship conferred a set of manorial rights.

Most German lordships were mediate, which meant that their lords and inhabitants owed allegiance to a territorial ruler — such as a duke, a margrave, a count, a prince, a prince-elector or a prince-bishop — who exercised a number of sovereign rights over them, including high justice, taxation and military conscription. However, several lordships were immediate, having gained that coveted status usually at some time during the Middle Ages. The lords of a small number of those immediate lordships, often imperial knights, eventually succeeded in having themselves raised to the status of count (Graf) or prince (Fürst) and recognized as imperial estates with a seat and vote at the Imperial Diet. Seventeenth-century jurists began to designate those immediate lordships, as well as the more important territories of imperial knights as baronia, and after them the custom was established in Germany to call them Baronie or Baronat (French: baronnie, English: barony) and their owners barons.

== See also ==
- List of lordships
- Herrschaft, German for lordship
- Seignory, French for lordship
- Heerlijkheid, Dutch for lordship
- Despotes, Greek for lordship
- Signoria, Italian for lordship
- Honra, Portuguese for lordship
- Provincial lordship
- Lordship of Ireland
