= Sinoutskerke en Baarsdorp =

Coordinates: 51°28′41″N 3°51′12″E

Sinoutskerke en Baarsdorp is a former municipality in the Dutch province of Zeeland. It existed until 1816, when it was merged with 's-Heer Abtskerke. As its name implies, the municipality It covered two hamlets, Sinoutskerke and Baarsdorp, located west and northwest of 's-Heer Abtskerke.

There is also a Lordship of Sinoutskerke and Baarsdorp, owned by the van Huykelom van de Pas family.
