= Ancient Norwegian property laws =

Two Norwegian property laws, which are so ancient that the time of their enactment is lost, govern Norwegian property. These are the Åsetesrett (homestead right), and the Odelsrett (also referred to as allodial right).

These two rights were considered important enough that they were included in the 1814 Constitution of Norway.

== See also ==
- Allodial title
- Udal law
- Odal (rune)
