= Íñigo Vélez de Guevara, Count consort of Oñate =

Spanish political figure

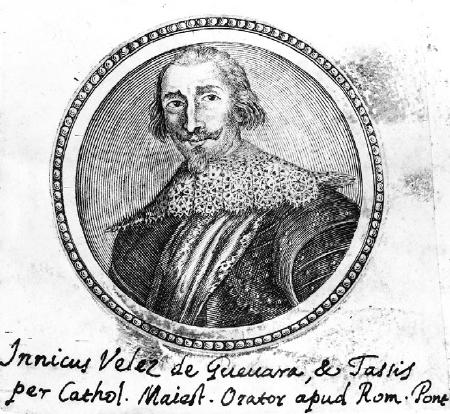
Íñigo Vélez de Guevara

Íñigo Vélez de Guevara, Count consort of Oñate and Count of Villamediana (1566 in Salinillas de Buradón, Alava; 31 October 1644 in Madrid) was a Spanish political figure. He played an important role in the Thirty Years' War.

== Biography ==
He was the son of Pedro Vélez de Guevara and María de Tassis. He married Catalina Vélez, 5th Countess of Oñate. When her only brother Ladrón was killed in battle on sea against the English in 1588, Catalina became Countess of Oñate. After the death of his cousin Juan de Tassis y Peralta, 2nd Count of Villamediana he also the title of Count of Villamediana.

He served as Spain's ambassador to the Holy See.

During the Thirty Years' War, the Spanish sent an army from Brussels under Ambrosio Spinola to support the Emperor, and, as the Spanish ambassador in Vienna, don Íñigo persuaded Protestant Saxony to intervene against Bohemia in exchange for control over Lusatia. The Saxons invaded, and the Spanish army in the West prevented the Protestant Union's forces from assisting.

As Spanish Ambassador, he openly took sides against Albrecht von Wallenstein, to whose downfall he contributed decisively. He also led Spanish diplomacy in the contacts that led to the signing of the Treaty of Oñate, which was named after him, between the Austrian and Spanish branches of the House of Habsburg.

Oñate conspired to transfer the Elector of the Palatinate title from the Electorate of the Palatinate to the Duke of Bavaria in exchange for his support and that of the Catholic League. Under the command of General Tilly, the Catholic League army (which included René Descartes in its ranks) pacified Upper Austria, while the Emperor's forces pacified Lower Austria; united, the two moved north into Bohemia. Ferdinand II decisively defeated Frederick V at the Battle of White Mountain, near Prague on 8 November 1620. In addition to making it Catholic, Bohemia would remain in Habsburg hands for three hundred years.

In Spain he had ambitions to follow the Duke of Lerma as valido, but the King's favourite and Íñigo's adversary was chosen, the Count-Duke of Olivares. He lost the King's favor and Luis de Haro became the successor of Olivares.

== Children ==
- Pedro, 6th Count of Oñate (1595–1614), killed in Milan after falling off his horse
- Juan, 7th Count of Oñate (1596–1615), priest
- Íñigo, 8th Count of Oñate (1597–1658), Viceroy of Naples
- Felipe Emmanuel, killed in battle in 1642 near Perpignan
- Beltrán (1607–1652), Viceroy of Sardinia
- María Ana, married Don Pedro Pimentel y Manrique, III marqués de Viana.
- Ana María. married Bernardo de Silva Manrique, II marqués de la Eliseda.
- Maria Angela, nun
- Catalina, nun
- Ana Maria, nun.
