= Uppland Runic Inscription 130 =

Rundata catalog listing for a Viking Age memorial runic inscription located in Sweden

Coordinates: 59°24′18″N 18°01′18″E

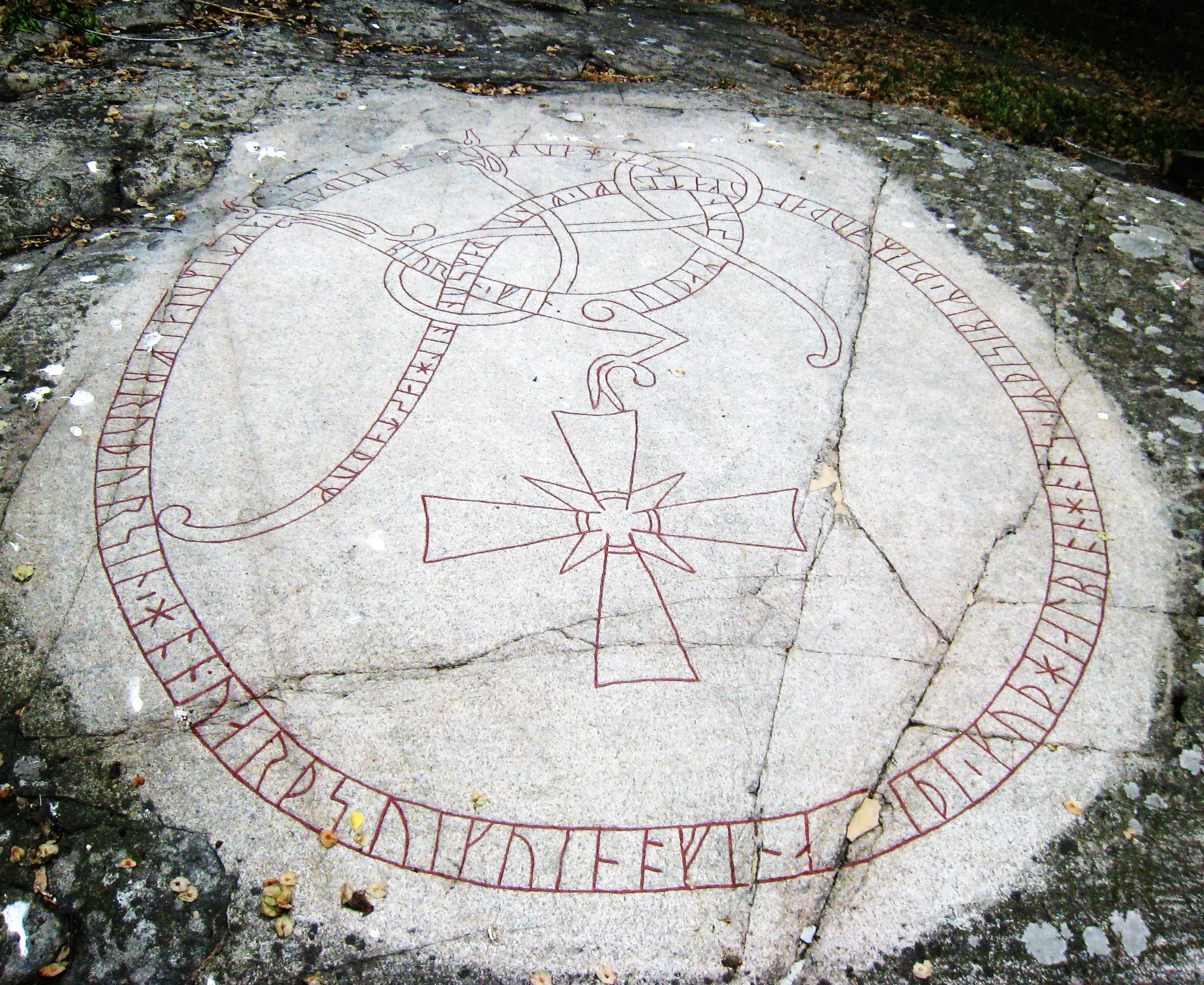
U 130 in Nora

Uppland Runic Inscription 130 or U 130 is the Rundata catalog listing for a Viking Age memorial runic inscription located at Nora, in Danderyd, Stockholm County, Sweden, and in the historic province of Uppland. The runic text directly refers to an estate held in an allodial title.

== Description ==
The inscription on U 130 consists of runic text in the younger futhark carved on a serpent that forms a circle. A cross is in the center of the inscription. The inscription, which is on a rock-face and is 1.9 meters tall by 1.54 meters wide, is classified as being carved in runestone style Pr4, also known as Urnes style. This runestone style is characterized by slim and stylized animals interwoven into tight patterns. The animal heads are typically seen in profile with slender almond-shaped eyes and upwardly curled appendages on the noses and the necks. This stone is considered to be a "good example" of an inscription in style Pr4. Based upon the stylistic analysis, the inscription has been attributed to a runemaster with the normalized name of Åsmund Kåresson. Åsmund was active in the first half of the 11th century in Uppland.

The runic text states that the inscription was a memorial sponsored by a man named Bjôrn in memory of his brother Óleifr, who died as a result of some form of betrayal. The brother's death took place in Finnheiðr or Finnveden, which is a former district in Småland. Other runestones that mention Finnveden include Sm 35 in Replösa and Sm 52 in Forsheda allmänning. U 130 is also a public record which resolves the legal issue of the inheritance of a farm located in Elgjastaðir or the modern village of Älgesta in Husby-Ärlinghundra parish, which the text states was held through an allodial title by Bjôrn as the family inheritance from his father Finnviðr. Under an allodial right, a member of a family had first rights to purchase a farm, and if the farm was sold to a stranger a family member could within a certain number of years redeem the property at the original sale price plus the cost of any improvements. It has been suggested that the inscription at Nora means that the two brothers owned two farms, one at Nora and the other thirty kilometers north at Älgesta. The runes suno on the stone, which translates as "sons at," follow the rule that double letters are represented with only a single letter, even if one of the two letters are at the end of one word and the second is at the beginning of the next word. The transliteration of the runic text for these words, suno| |o, shows word divisions and a separate o-rune for each of the two words.

The inscription is known locally as the Norahällen. Bjôrn, the sponsor of U 130, would later raise another runestone, U 433 which was found at the church in Husby-Ärlinghundra, in memory of himself.

== Inscription ==
ᛒᛁᚢᚱᚿ ' ᚠᛁᚿᚢᛁᚦᛆᛦ ᛋᚢᚿ ᛚᛁᛏ ' ᚼᛆᚢᚴᛆ ' ᚼᛁᛚᛁ ᚦᛁᛋᛆ ' ᛆᚠᛏᛁᛦ ᚢᛚᛆᛁᚠ ᛒᚱᚢᚦᚢᚱ ᛋᛁᚿ ' ᚼᚭᚿ ᚢᛆᚱᚦ ᛋᚢᛁᚴᚢᛁᚿ ᚭ {ᚠᛁᚿᛆ ᛁᚦᛁ} ' ᚴᚢᚦ ᚼᛁᛆᛚᛒᛁ ᚭᚿ ᚼᚭᚿᛋ ' ᛁᛦ ᚦᛁᛋᛁ ᛒᛁᛦ ' ᚦᛆᛁᛦᛆ ᚢᚦᛆᛚ ᚢᚴ ᛆᛏᚱᚠᛁ ' ᚠᛁᚿᚢᚦᛆᛦ ᛋᚢᚿᚭ ᛁᛚᚼᛁᛆᛋᛏᛆᚦᚢᛘ
biurn ' finuiþaʀ sun lit ' haukua ' hili þisa ' aftiʀ ulaif bruþur sin ' hon uarþ suikuin o f(i)(n)aiþi ' kuþ hialbi on hons ' iʀ þisi biʀ ' þaiʀa uþal uk at(r)fi ' finuþaʀ {suno| |o} ilhiastaþum
Biorn, {} Finnviðaʀ sunn, let {} hoggva {} hælli þessa {} æftiʀ Olæif, broður sinn. {} Hann varð svikvinn a Finnæiði. {} Guð hialpi and hans. {} Eʀ þessi byʀ {} þæiʀa oðal ok ættærfi, {} Finnviðaʀ {suna a} Ælgiastaðum.
Bjǫrn, Finnviðr's son, had this rock-slab cut in memory of Óleifr, his brother. He was betrayed at Finnheiðr. May God help his spirit. This estate is the allodial land and family inheritance of Finnviðr's sons at Elgjastaðir.

== See also ==
- List of runestones
- Odelsrett
