= Odelsrett =

Scandinavian family land laws

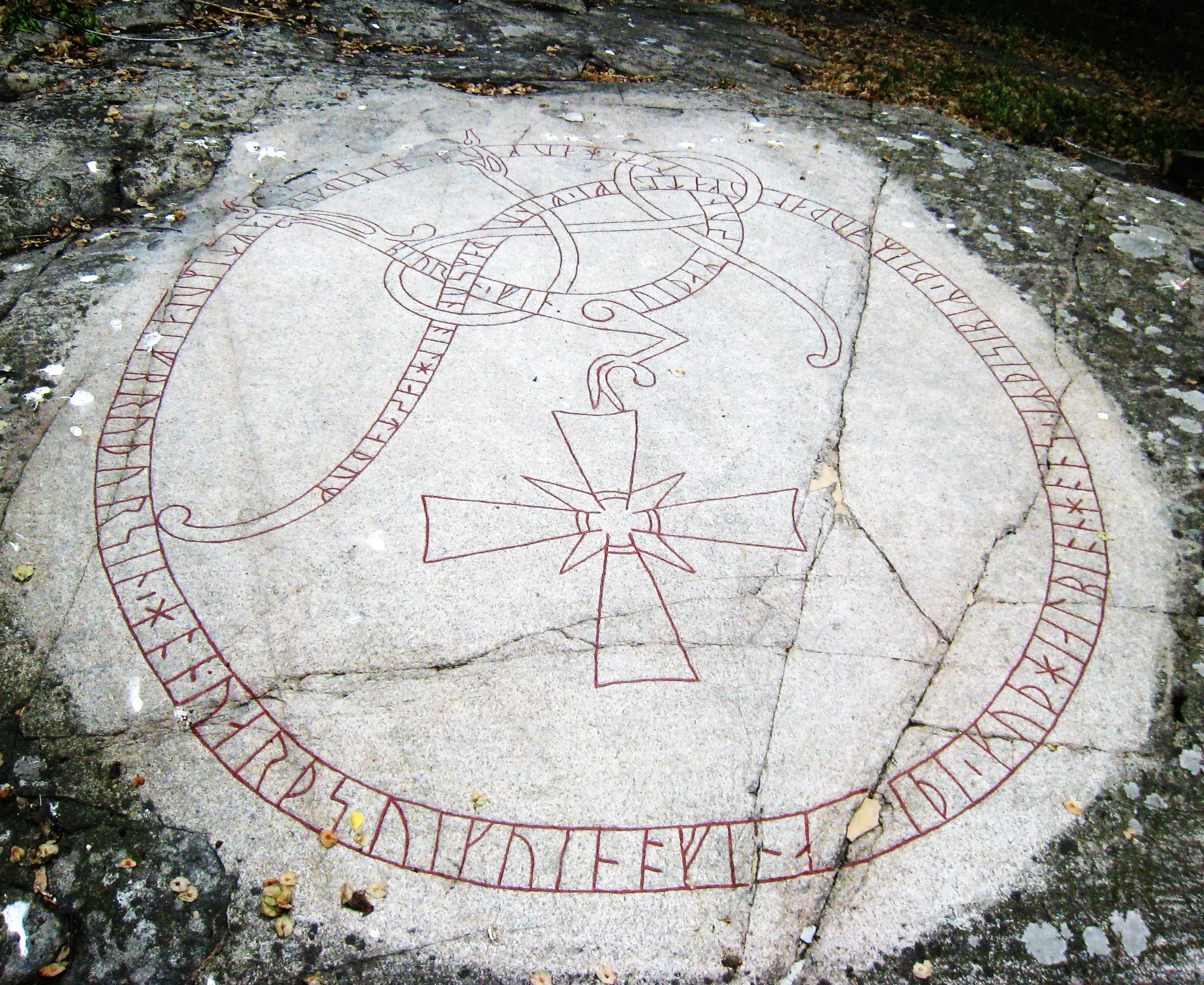
The runic text of inscription U 130 directly refers to an estate in Sweden with an allodial title held by the son as his inheritance from his father.

The Odelsrett is an ancient Scandinavian allodial title which has survived in Norway as odelsrett and existed until recent times in Sweden as bördsrätt.

The Norwegian law stipulates the right, when a farm is to be sold, of any member of the family, by the principle of primogeniture, to buy it, consistent with Åsetesrett.

If the property is sold to a stranger, family members have the right within a specified period of time (which varies over history, but ten years can be considered typical of recent usage) to redeem it at the price paid, with the additional cost of the improvements.

If there is controversy, appraisers are appointed.

Later law modified this, so that an owner selling his farm may determine whether he renounces for himself and heirs this right.

It has been argued that this law served as a mainstay to the long-lasting agrarian culture in Norway.

== History ==
Arnfinn Kjelland provides a historical perspective:

“(For a) farm (to) become allodium by gain, it must have been owned by the same family for a specific period of time, without objection by or claim from an earlier owner with allodium. According to the oldest regional law, Gulatingsloven, a farm became allodium property after 6 generations' ownership. A farm could also be redeemed by a member of the previous owner's family (if they had gained allodium) during the same period of time, after it had been sold. In the first national law of Norway (1274) the period (both to gain allodium and redemption) is reduced to 60 years; in 1604 to 30 years; in 1687 to 20 years to gain, and 10 years to redeem; in 1811 an attempt to remove the allodium was tried, but the Constitution of 1814 stated that allodium is everlasting.
"It is necessary to distinguish between regular ownership to a farm, and allodium. You may buy a farm, but you should be prepared to give it up if a member of the seller's family, who has allodium, claims his or her right to redeem it. This still happens in Norway, maybe once every 5–10 years in any community.”

Allodial title did not exclusively serve to ensure that land merely stayed in a particular family. It also offered daughters some protection when their inheritance rights were threatened by male relatives. If the father sold the land to his male relatives in an effort to avoid the transfer of land from his family to the daughters who were closer in succession, the daughters had a right to buy it back from the male relatives.

== See also ==
- Allodial title
- Ancient Norwegian property laws
- Fee tail
- Jubilee (biblical)
- Land tenure
- Odal (rune)
- Udal law
