= 's-Gravenpolder =

- Village
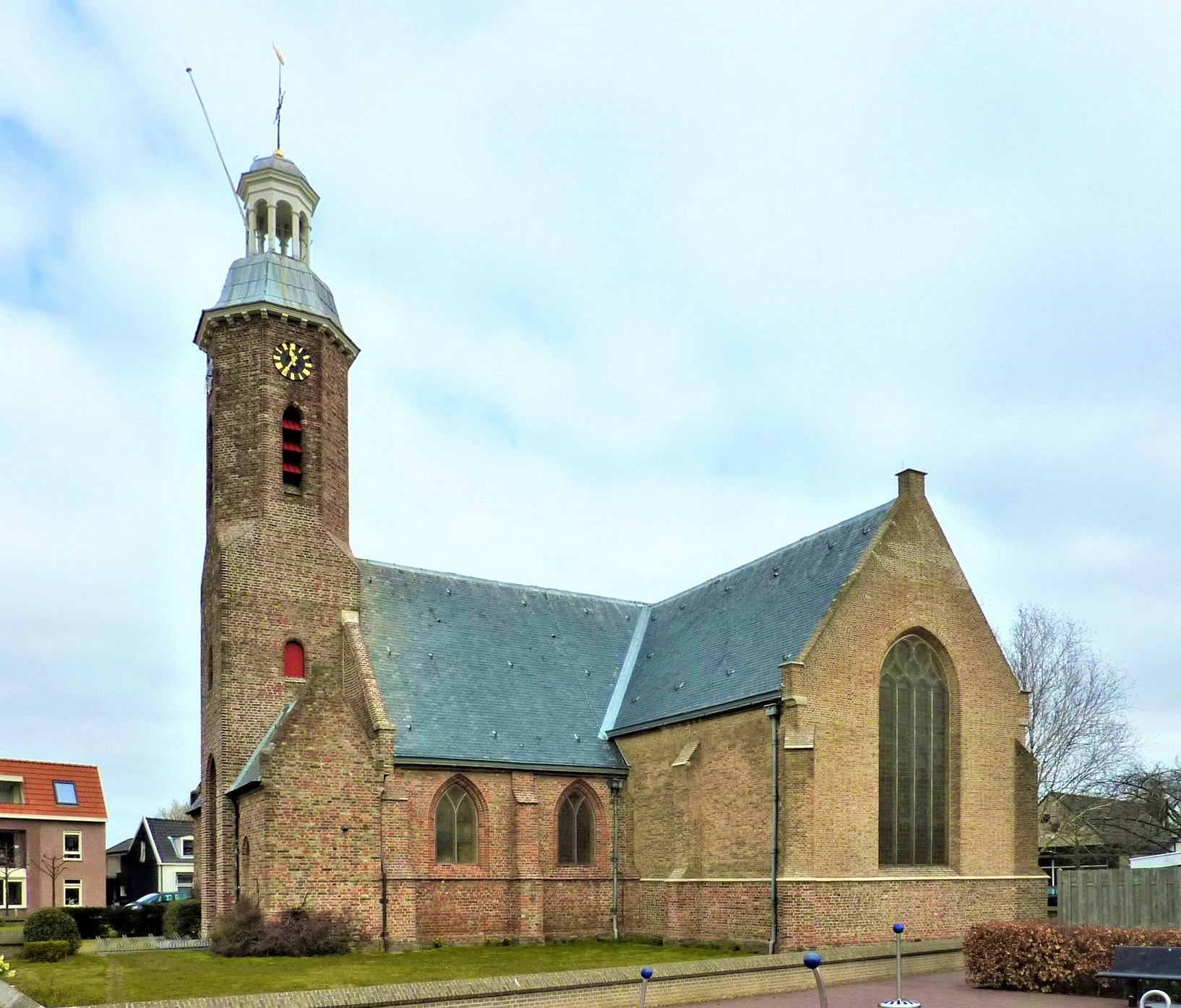
- St Martinus Church

- Flag Coat of arms

- Location in the province of Zeeland in the Netherlands 's-Gravenpolder (Netherlands)
- Coordinates: 51°27′35″N 3°54′12″E
- Country: Netherlands
- Province: Zeeland
- Municipality: Borsele

Area
  - Total: 8.00 km^{2} (3.09 sq mi)
- Elevation: 1.0 m (3.3 ft)

Population (2021)
  - Total: 4,690
  - Density: 586/km^{2} (1,520/sq mi)
- Time zone: UTC+1 (CET)
  - Summer (DST): UTC+2 (CEST)
- Postal code: 4431
- Dialing code: 0113

's-Gravenpolder is a village in the Dutch province of Zeeland. It is a part of the municipality of Borsele, and lies about 21 kilometres east of Middelburg.

== History ==
The village was first mentioned in 1318 as "dat Nuweland van Vortrap", and means "polder of the Count". Before 1316, William III, Count of Holland ordered the construction of a dike around Voortrappen. It was first called 's-Gravenpolder in 1386. The polder and village were owned by the Count of Holland until 1430. 's-Gravenpolder developed as a linear road village.

The Dutch Reformed church is a Gothic cruciform church with built-in tower. The choir probably dates from the late-14th century. The tower and nave were constructed in the early-15th century. It was severely damaged during World War II. During the renovation of 1959 to 1961, the plaster was removed and the current spire was built.

The grist mill De Korenhalm was built in 1876. An electro motor was installed in a shed near the wind mill. Since 1992, it is owned by a foundation and still in service.

's-Gravenpolder was home to 577 people in 1840. In 1927, a joint railway station with 's-Heer Abtskerke opened on the Goes to Hoedekenskerke. It closed in 1947. The village was severely damaged during World War II. 's-Gravenpolder was a separate municipality until 1970 when it merged into Borsele.

== Gallery ==
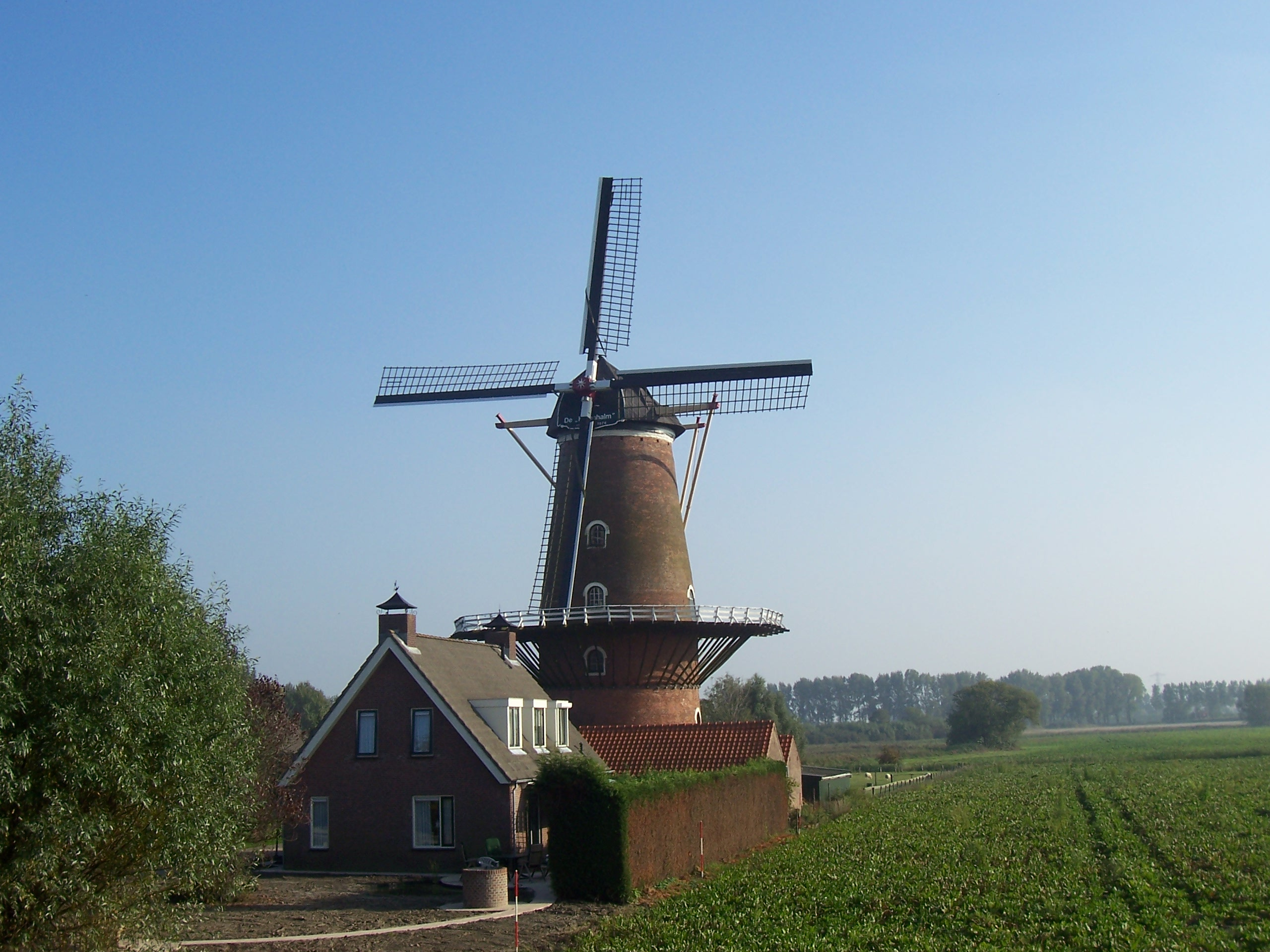
Wind mill De Korenhalm

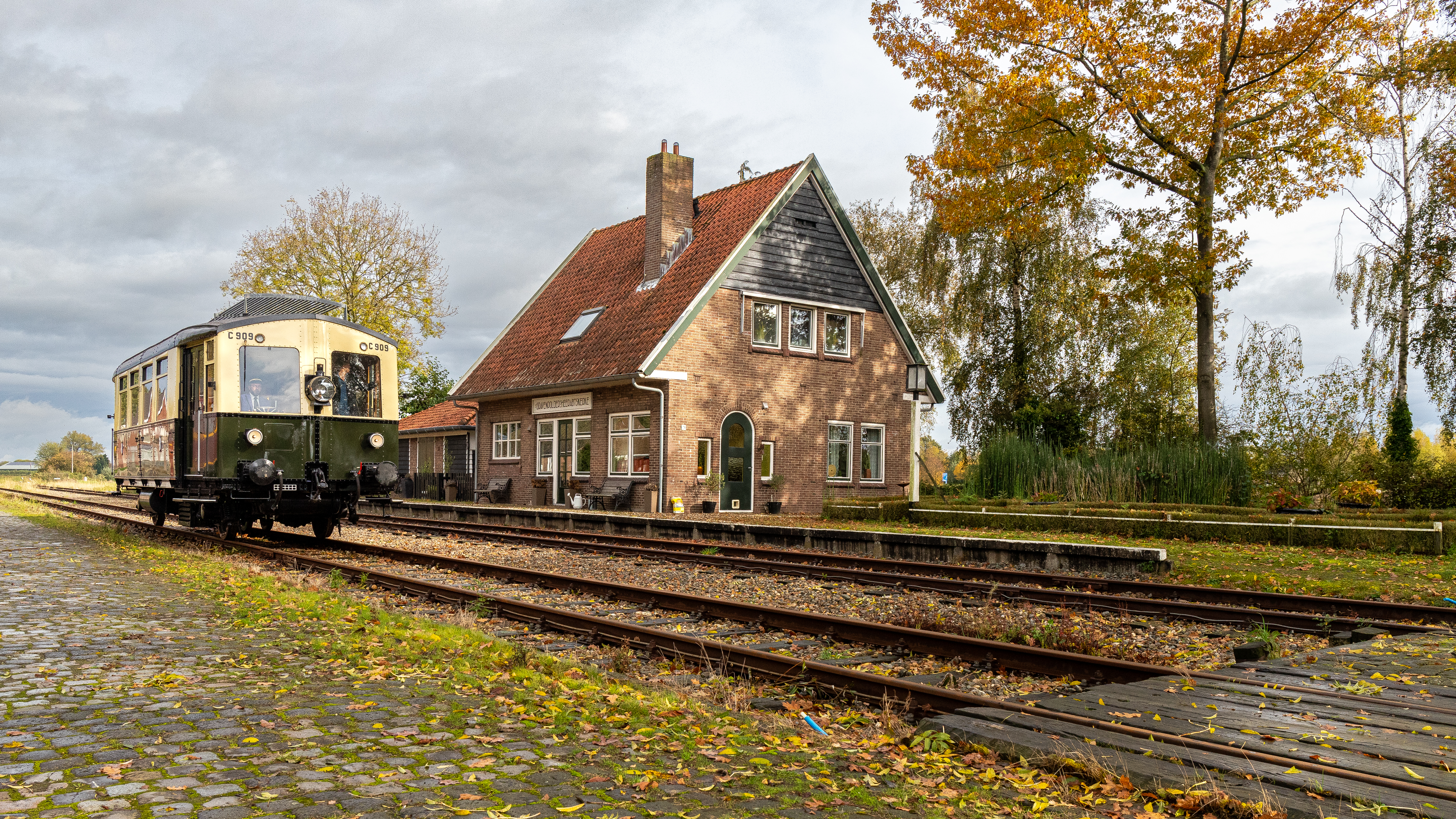
Former railway station

== See also ==
- Oost- en Middelzwake
