= Oñate treaty =

Treaty between Austrian and Spanish branches of the House of Habsburg

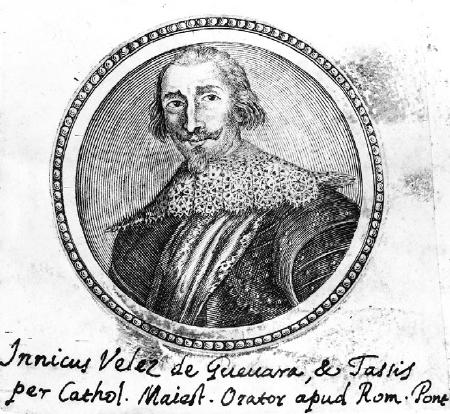
Iñigo Vélez de Guevara, conde de Oñate

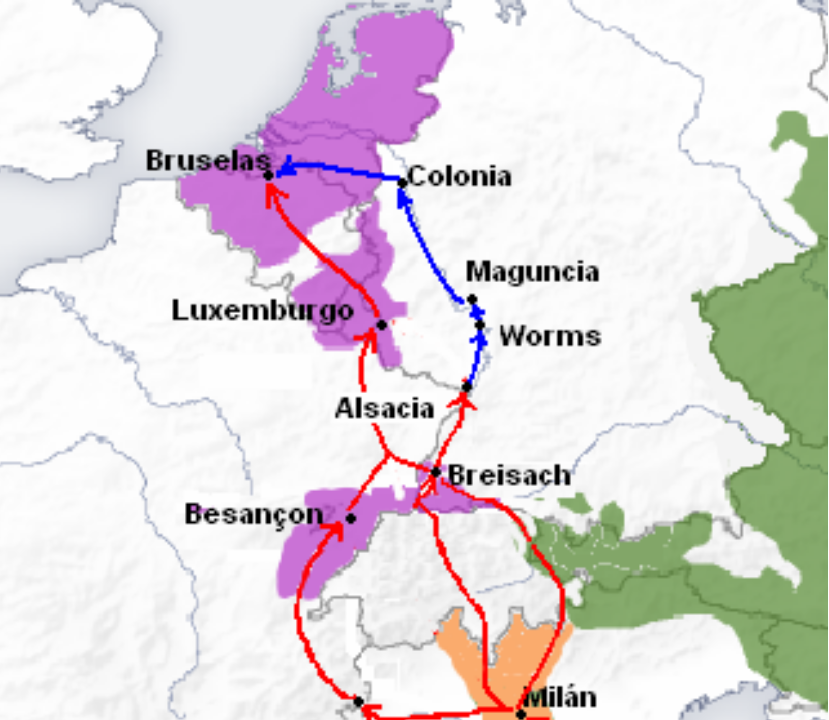
The "Spanish Road": Spanish possessions in orange and purple, Austria in green. Main road in red, along the Rhine also in blue.

The Oñate treaty of 6 June 1617 was a secret treaty between the Austrian and Spanish branches of the House of Habsburg.

The senior Habsburg branch of Spanish king Philip III reached an agreement with the junior Habsburg branch of Austrian archduke Ferdinand II concerning allocation of key holdings still in dispute following the division of the House of Habsburg. Spanish Philip III agreed that Austrian Ferdinand II should be the only Habsburg to contend to be king of Bohemia and Hungary, allowing Ferdinand II to focus Austrian resources against estates in those two kingdoms who disputed the Habsburg right to inherit the titles from his childless cousin, Matthias of Habsburg, the reigning king and the Holy Roman Emperor. In turn, Ferdinand II granted Philip III undisputed reign of Habsburg territories along the "Spanish Road", a loosely connected string of Habsburg territories that ranged from upper Italy, through Alsace and the Free County of Burgundy, to the Spanish Netherlands, securing the main Spanish supply route in the Eighty Years' War (or Dutch War of Independence) against the Protestant Dutch. The agreement was named after Iñigo de Oñate, the Spanish ambassador in Vienna, who negotiated its final version.

== Background ==
In 1612, Rudolph II, Holy Roman Emperor, died and was succeeded by his brother Matthias. Since Matthias and the other archdukes of the main branch of the Austrian Habsburgs were childless, they agreed to transfer succession over their lands to the Styrian branch of the Habsburgs, thus effectively agreeing on the succession of Ferdinand II.

The agreement amongst the Austrian Habsburgs was made without regard to King Philip III of Spain, head of the Spanish Habsburgs, who continued to press his own claims to Holy Roman succession on behalf of his sons. Philip's branch was more senior and more powerful than the Austrian branch of the Habsburgs, and Philip himself asserted a claim to the imperial crown as a grandson of Maximilian II and Charles V.

The agreement to transfer succession to the Styrian Habsburgs concerned Holy Roman Emperor Matthias' chief political and religious advisor, Cardinal Melchior Klesl. As head of Matthias' Secret Council, Klesl was working to facilitate a reconciliation between Catholics and Protestants in Austria, hoping to prevent a continued paralysis of the Holy Roman Empire's institutions: the Reichstag was unable to convene in 1608 and 1613, and the common Türkenhilfe defense against the Ottoman threat was at risk. Cardinal Klesl knew that Ferdinand II favoured the Counter-Reformation, which aimed to address some of the Church's institutional problems that had been raised by the Protestant noblemen whose support was instrumental to the Holy Roman Empire's operations.

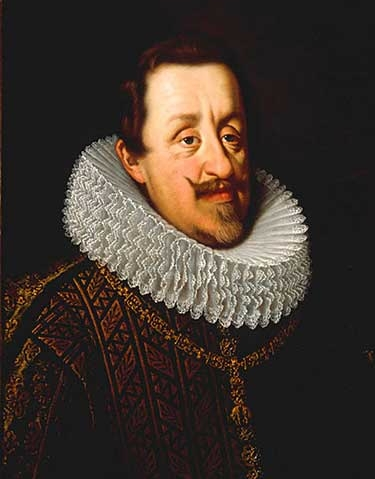
Ferdinand II, Holy Roman Emperor

== Habsburg terms ==
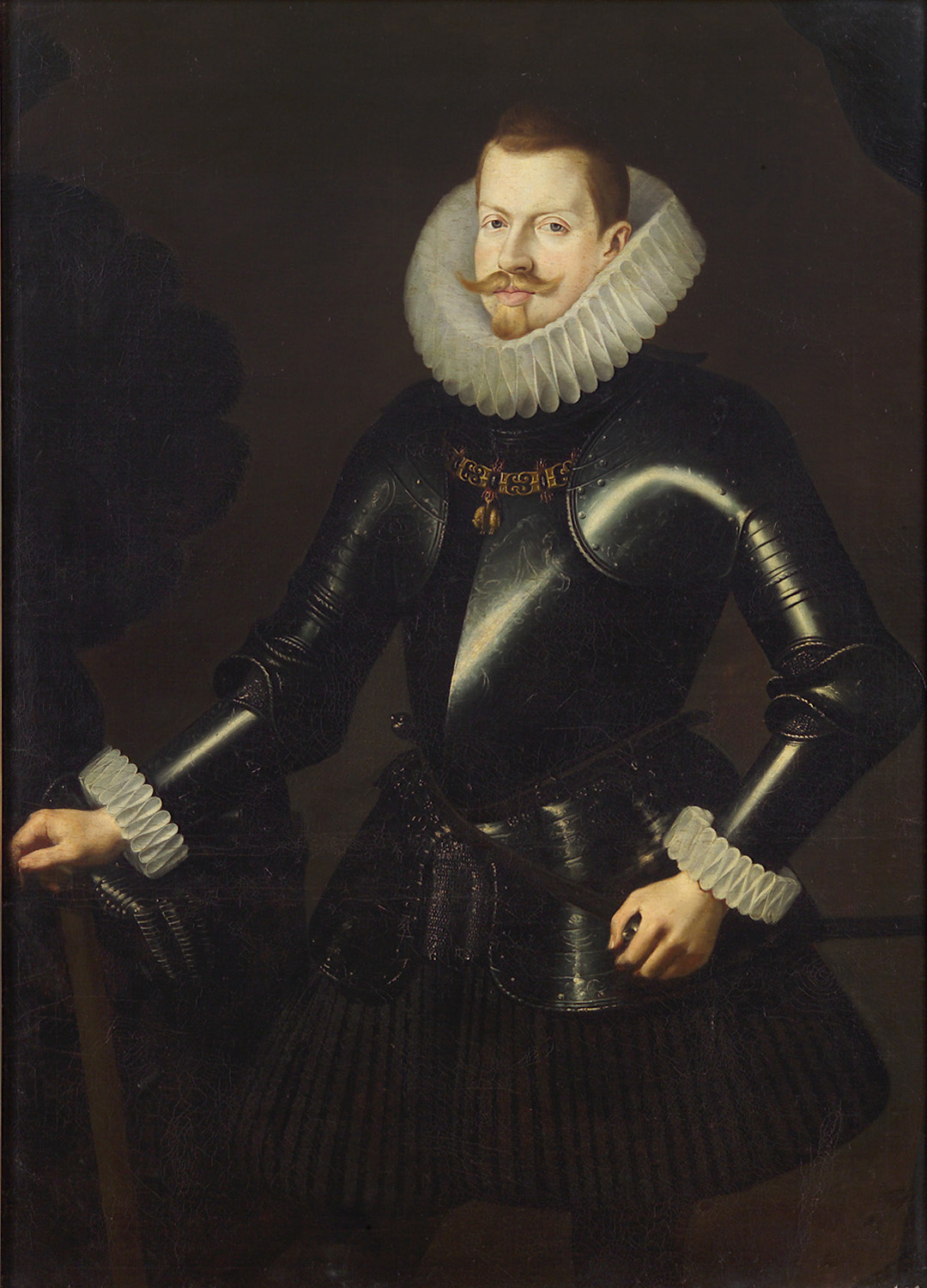
Philip III of Spain

Philip's envoys at the court of the Holy Roman Empire were Baltasar de Zúñiga and Íñigo Vélez de Guevara, 7th Count of Oñate.

Philip III was willing to accept Ferdinand II as successor of Matthias if certain conditions were met. Philip's greater priority was the Eighty Years' War and his desire to secure the so-called Spanish Road, a land route connecting the Spanish possessions in northern Italy with the Spanish Netherlands. The sea route to the Spanish Netherlands was insecure, since much of the Spanish Armada had been lost and the Scheldt river was blocked by the Dutch Republic. While these setbacks had caused Philip to agree to a suspension of hostilities in Europe (the Twelve Years' Truce), the Eighty Years' War was still raging in the colonies and Philip intended to resume hostilities in the European theatre rather than accept the peace conditions proposed by the Dutch Republic. Philip also wanted to strengthen his position in Italy by acquiring principalities around its Duchy of Milan and by gaining direct access to the Mediterranean Sea via towns like Finale Ligure, allowing it to bypass the Republic of Genoa.

Preliminary terms were agreed between Philip and Ferdinand in January 1617, calling for the cession of several Holy Roman fiefdoms in Italy, but did not initially include Alsace. The treaty was concluded on 29 July 1617.

Philip III agreed to renounce his claims to the thrones of Bohemia and Hungary, so long as the princes of the Kingdom of Germany did elect Ferdinand II as ruler of the Holy Roman Empire upon the death of Emperor Matthias. In return, Ferdinand II promised Philip III the town of Finale Ligure, the Principality of Piombino (both of which were already occupied by Spain), as well as cession of Austrian Habsburg rights to Ortenau and Alsace.

The Spanish and Austrian Habsburgs kept the Oñate treaty secret from Cardinal Klesl.

== Implementation and consequences ==
With support of Maximilian III, Archduke of Austria, and no opposition from Philip III of Spain, Ferdinand II managed to win the Bohemian and Hungarian crowns in 1617 and 1618, respectively. This placed Ferdinand in a strong position to win any future election for Holy Roman Emperor. On 20 May 1618, Klesl, who continued to promote a Catholic-Protestant rapprochement, was arrested by Ferdinand II and Maximilian III.

Holy Roman Emperor Matthias died on 20 March 1619. The Bohemian estates turned against Ferdinand II, and on 26 and 27 August 1619 elected Frederick V, Elector Palatine, the leader of the Protestants in the Holy Roman Empire, as the new "winter king" of Bohemia. On the following day, Ferdinand II was elected Holy Roman Emperor by the other princes of the Kingdom of Germany.

The events in Bohemia resulted in mobilization of the German Catholic League, and with Spanish support, Ferdinand II defeated the Bohemian estates and expelled the "winter king" in the Battle of White Mountain on 8 November 1620.

== Sources ==
=== Bibliography ===
- Altmann, Hugo (1992). "Klesl". Biographisch-bibliographisches Kirchenlexikon (in German). Vol. 4. Bautz.
- Kampmann, Christoph (2008). Europa und das Reich im Dreißigjährigen Krieg. Geschichte eines europäischen Konflikts (in German). Kohlhammer Verlag. ISBN 978-3-17-018550-0.
- Kohler, Alfred (1990). Das Reich im Kampf um die Hegemonie in Europa 1521-1648. Enzyklopädie deutscher Geschichte (in German). Vol. 6. Oldenbourg. ISBN 3-486-55461-1.
- Press, Volker (1991). Kriege und Krisen. Deutschland 1600-1715. Neue deutsche Geschichte (in German). Vol. 5. C.H.Beck. ISBN 3-406-30817-1.
- Schormann, Gerhard (2004). Der Dreißigjährige Krieg. Kleine Reihe (in German). Vol. 1506 (3 ed.). Vandenhoeck & Ruprecht. ISBN 3-525-33506-7.
