= Ulmus minor 'Schuurhoek' =

Elm cultivar

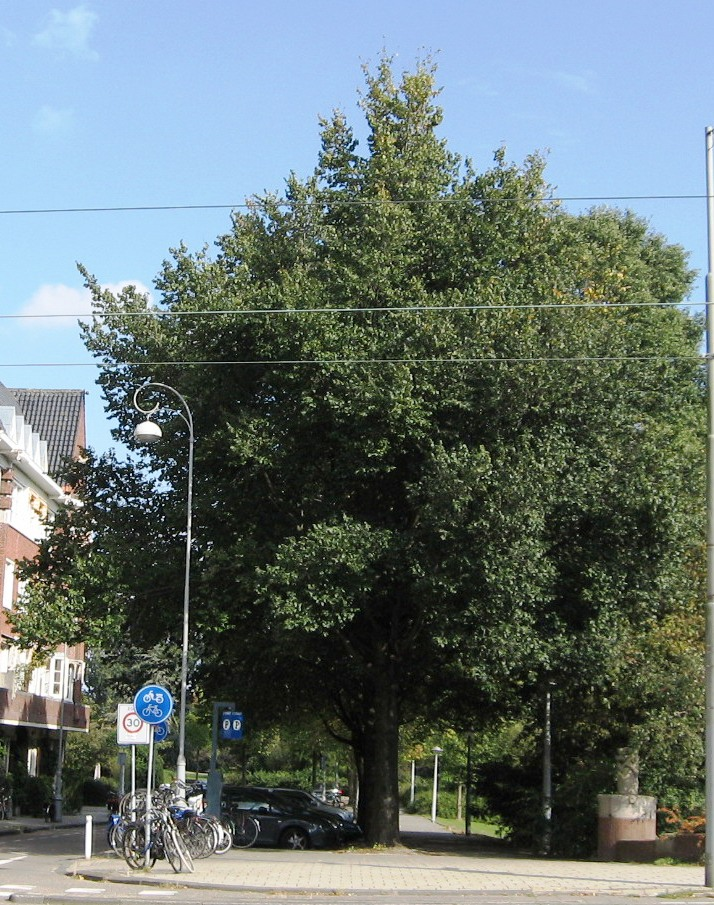
- 'Schuurhoek', Beethovenstraat, Amsterdam.
- Species: Ulmus minor
- Cultivar: 'Schuurhoek'
- Origin: Goes, Netherlands

The Field Elm cultivar Ulmus minor 'Schuurhoek' was originally an old, nameless clone cultivated c.1880 in the vicinity of Goes, Netherlands, which was taken back into cultivation as 'Schuurhoek' by the van't Westeinde nursery (now 'Kwekerij Westhof') at 's-Heer Abtskerke, Zeeland, in the 1950s. It was identified as U. carpinifolia (:U. minor) by Fontaine (1968), though treated as a cultivar of U. × hollandica by some authorities.

== Description ==
A tall tree, the trunk covered with light branches over its entire length, and reputedly very resistant to exposure. Fontaine described the leaves as "quite long-pointed for the species".

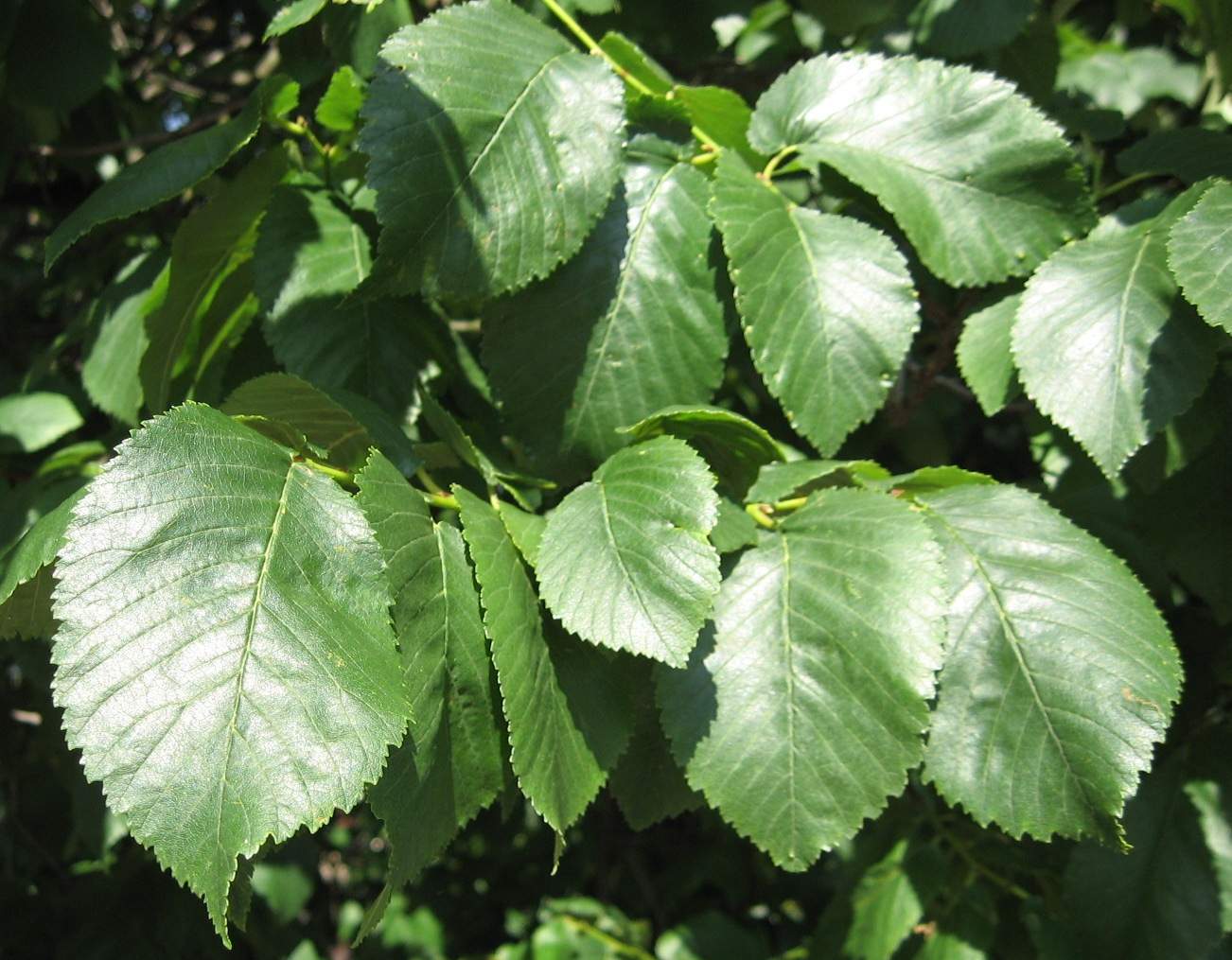
'Schuurhoek' leaves

== Pests and diseases ==
No resistance to Dutch elm disease has been noted, and the tree is susceptible to Verticillium wilt.

== Cultivation ==
The elm was originally cultivated as a windbreak tree in coastal areas of the Netherlands. It was included in elm trials at Ankeveen in 2009, as part of Wijdemeren City Council's elm collection. It is not known to have been introduced to North America or Australasia.

== Etymology ==
The tree is named for the small rural district of Schuurhoek in Zeeland.

== Notable trees ==
F. J. Fontaine reported in 1968 a fairly close-planted, c.80-year old stand on the dykes between Ovezande and Oudelande, forming a tall, hedge-shaped windbreak.

== Accessions ==
None known.
