= Oost- en Middelzwake =

Oost- en Middelzwake (also called Zwake) is a former municipality in the Dutch province of Zeeland. It covered a number of polders in the area of the former inlet De Zwake between the former islands of Borssele, Baarland and Zuid-Beveland.

It was a separate municipality until 1816, when it was merged with 's-Gravenpolder.

In the middle of the 19th century, the area had a population of about 50.
