= Wienkeltje van Wullempje =

Dutch museum

Coordinates: 51°25′28″N 3°54′44″E

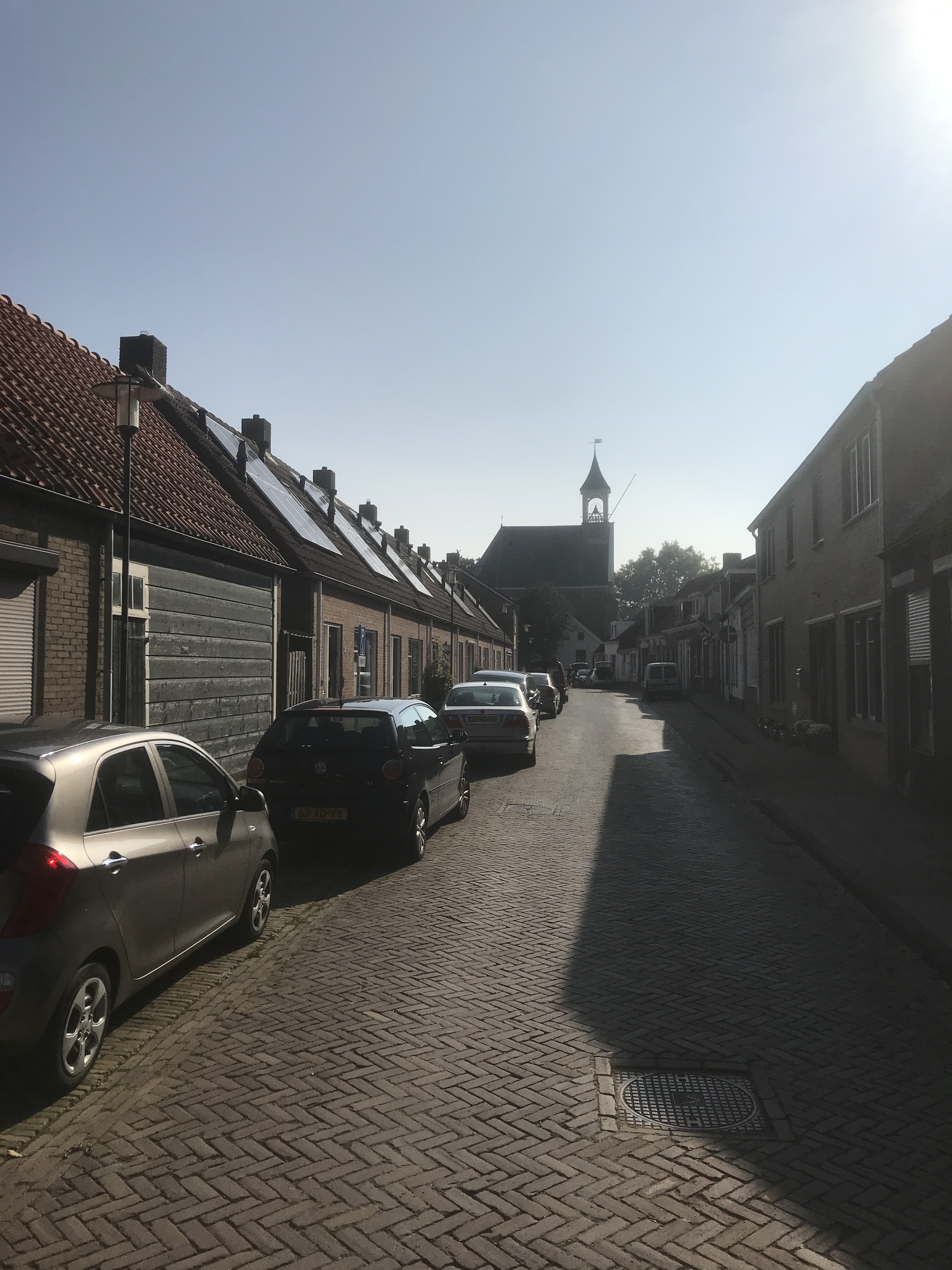
- Street of the museum with entrance at the right (behind car; facade with flag)
- Location: Hoedekenskerke, Zeeland, Netherlands
- Type: Historic house museum

Wienkeltje van Wullempje is a small historic house museum including the historic shop located in Hoedekenskerke, in the province of Zeeland in the Netherlands. The building is one of the oldest houses in the village, although its exact age is unknown. The museum offers an impression of daily life between the 1930s and 1950s, focusing on the lives of its last resident Willem 'Wullempje' de Bart, his grandmother Neeltje de Bart-Lavooij, and his aunt.

== History ==
The building functioned as a village shop until around 1970, selling sweets as well as various daily necessities. Willem de Bart also worked as a peddler (marskramer), distributing goods in the surrounding area. The shop also allows visitors to experience the historic living environment of its former inhabitants.

During the COVID-19 pandemic, the museum was closed for more than two years due to limited space, and later reopened after restrictions were lifted.

== Description ==
The museum preserves an authentic interior reflecting mid-20th-century rural life. The small living room contains two box-beds, painted woodwork, traditional furnishings, and religious wall decorations. The house also includes a historic kitchen, wash area, and outdoor toilet facilities typical of the period.

== Present day ==
Today, the site operates as both a tourist attraction and a nostalgic sweet shop, allowing visitors to experience historical rural Dutch life while purchasing traditional confectionery.

The shop continues to operate and is maintained as a heritage-style attraction with long-term staff involvement.
