= Allod =

Historic type of land estate

Allod, deriving from Frankish alōd meaning "full ownership" (from al "full, whole" and ōd "property, possession"; Medieval Latin allod or allodium), also known as allodial land was, in medieval and early modern European feudal law, a form of property ownership where the owner had full and absolute title. The allodial landowner, also known as an allodiary or hereditary lord, had the right to alienate the property, which was almost always land, a city plot, or an estate, and owed no feudal duties to any other person in respect of it.

== Description ==
Historically, holders of allods are a type of sovereign. Allodial land is described as territory or a state, along with associated serfs, where the holder asserts the right to the land by holding it in absolute ownership, free from any feudal obligations or dues to a superior. This means the land is owned outright, without any rent, service, or acknowledgment to a higher lord or authority.

For this reason, they were historically equal to other princes regardless of the size of their territory or the title they used. This definition is confirmed by the acclaimed jurist Hugo Grotius, the father of international law and the concept of sovereignty: "holders of allodial land are sovereign" because allodial land is by nature free, hereditary, inherited from their forefathers, sovereign and held by the grace of God.

This form of ownership meant that the landowner owed no feudal duties to any other person. An allod could be inherited freely according to the usual law of the land. To begin with, the income from allodial estates was not even liable for taxes paid to any other sovereigns, including the Landesfürsten (princely heads of state).

In all of these ways, the allod differed from fiefs, which were mere tenures held by feudatories (Lehnsmänner) or their vassals (Vasallen). Overall suzerainty in a fief remained with the feudal lord, who could require of his vassals certain services which varied from vassal to vassal. Also, the ownership of a fief was split so that a lord had dominium directum and his tenant in fee had dominium utile (German nutzbares Eigentum). By contrast, an allodiary had a full freehold interest – or dominium plenum (volles Eigentum) – in his allod. This was also reflected in the contemporaneous synonym for an allod, Erbe und Eigen (loosely "inheritance and ownership"). Borough properties were usually allodial. Likewise, ecclesiastical institutions (e.g. abbeys and cathedrals) owned allodial estates.

The conversion of a fief into a freehold – a familiar process in the 19th century – is called enfranchisement. Ownership of enfranchised fiefs continued to be limited, however, to the rights of the former feudatories. Only the overall suzerainty of the feudal lord over the estate was repealed, while the rights of the feudatory remained unaffected. Such an enfranchised fief became analogous to entailment (Familienfideikommiss); often it was explicitly converted into a fee tail (Fideikommissgut).

== Emergence and historical development ==
The allod as a form of ownership was established among the Germanic tribes and peoples, before it became part of the feudal system. Land that was originally held in common by the whole community was transferred to a single individual. The freemen of the Germanic peoples divided or drew lots for the land in the countries they had conquered and taken possession of. This gave rise to the essential character of the allodial estate: a freely-owned property allocated and guaranteed by the will of the whole people or by the people's law (Volksgesetz). The landowner was independent of any superiors and free of any property right restrictions.

In many regions only allodiaries were counted as freemen, i.e., those who enjoyed all common, public rights and duties. They served as territorial assemblymen (Landesgemeinde). The allodiaries of the early Middle Ages are one of the groups out of which the nobility sprang over time. They saw themselves as equal partners of the territorial lords, because they participated alongside them as members of the territorial assembly and were not their vassals. The freedoms associated with allodial estates (tax exemption, hunting rights, etc.) were only exercised by the nobility in most states – even if, after 1500, they had to subordinate themselves increasingly to the territorial princes (as part of the establishment of statehood) – who remained, politically and economically, the most influential group of landowners.

The term 'allod' occurs only in the Franconian region and those territories influenced legally by Frankish tribes. After the Battle of Hastings in 1066, there were no more allods in England at all (though Lundy was later deemed to not be in England) and, in France, allodial estates existed mainly in the south. In Germany, the allodial estates were mainly those owned by the nobility in the south, though in the north at least one Belgian village has a name that recalls this system, namely Braine-l'Alleud, Dutch Eigenbrakel (where eigen is cognate to English own), in the province of Walloon Brabant, formerly in, or surrounded by, the southern part of the Duchy of Brabant; this is in contrast with Braine-le-Comte ('s-Gravenbrakel), some 25 km away in Hainaut, whose name refers to a fief from the count of Hainaut; both Hainaut and Brabant were formerly part of the Holy Roman Empire and before that of Lotharingia. There were many lords who founded their powerful position on extensive allodial estates in the eastern Alpine countries and the lands of the Bohemian Crown. The king as lord paramount never exercised lordship over the whole Empire.

An allodial estate could also be created when a lord renounced his rights in favour of his vassal. Deforested land was considered allodial by the princes. Conversely, free territorial lords were sometimes punished by the Emperor by converting their allodial land into fiefs.

The differences between the two forms of medieval ownership – the fief and the allod – diminished over time. Firstly, vassals were no longer required to render services from the 17th century at the latest, and vassals' rights of inheritance became much stronger in the early modern period, and, secondly, the territorial princes were able to force freemen in the 16th century to make regular tax payments. In the 19th century, feudal law was finally gradually abolished in most European countries largely due to the Napoleonic wars and the influence of the Napoleonic Code. It fully integrated the ius commune system of ownership as a full right in rem. While in France the régime féodal was ended in 1789 by the stroke of the pen under the Revolutionary legislature, in Germany it was not until the mid-20th century that feudal law was formally abolished in 1947 by Allied Control Council law. In most of Scotland, the feudal system was abolished in the early 21st century; allodial tenure still exists in Shetland and Orkney.

== See also ==
- Commons
- Feudalism in the Holy Roman Empire
- Crown land
- Imperial estate
- Droit de régale
- Allodial title
- Odal
- Udal law

== Literature ==
- Otto Brunner: Land und Herrschaft. Grundfragen der territorialen Verfassungsgeschichte Österreichs im Mittelalter. 5th edition, Rohrer, Vienna, 1965 (Unamended reprographic copy of the 5th edition: Wissenschaftliche Buchgesellschaft, Darmstadt, 1984, ISBN 3-534-09466-2).
