= Nulle terre sans seigneur =

Principle of feudal systems

In feudal law, nulle terre sans seigneur (French for "no land without (a) lord", pronounced [nyl tɛʁ sɑ̃ sɛɲœʁ]) is the principle that one provides services to the sovereign (usually serving in his army) for the right to receive land from the sovereign. Originally a maxim of feudal law, it applies in modern form to paying rates or land tax for land of former feudal or feudal-like origin such as land with modern fee simple title, as opposed to land with allodial or udal title.

In the original French, the expression means "No land without a lord" though the legal sense might be more akin to "no property without a liege" since it was at the basis of the link between the infeodated or feal and his liege, in the feudal system.

== See also ==
- History of English land law
- Aboriginal title
