= 's-Heer Abtskerke =

- Village
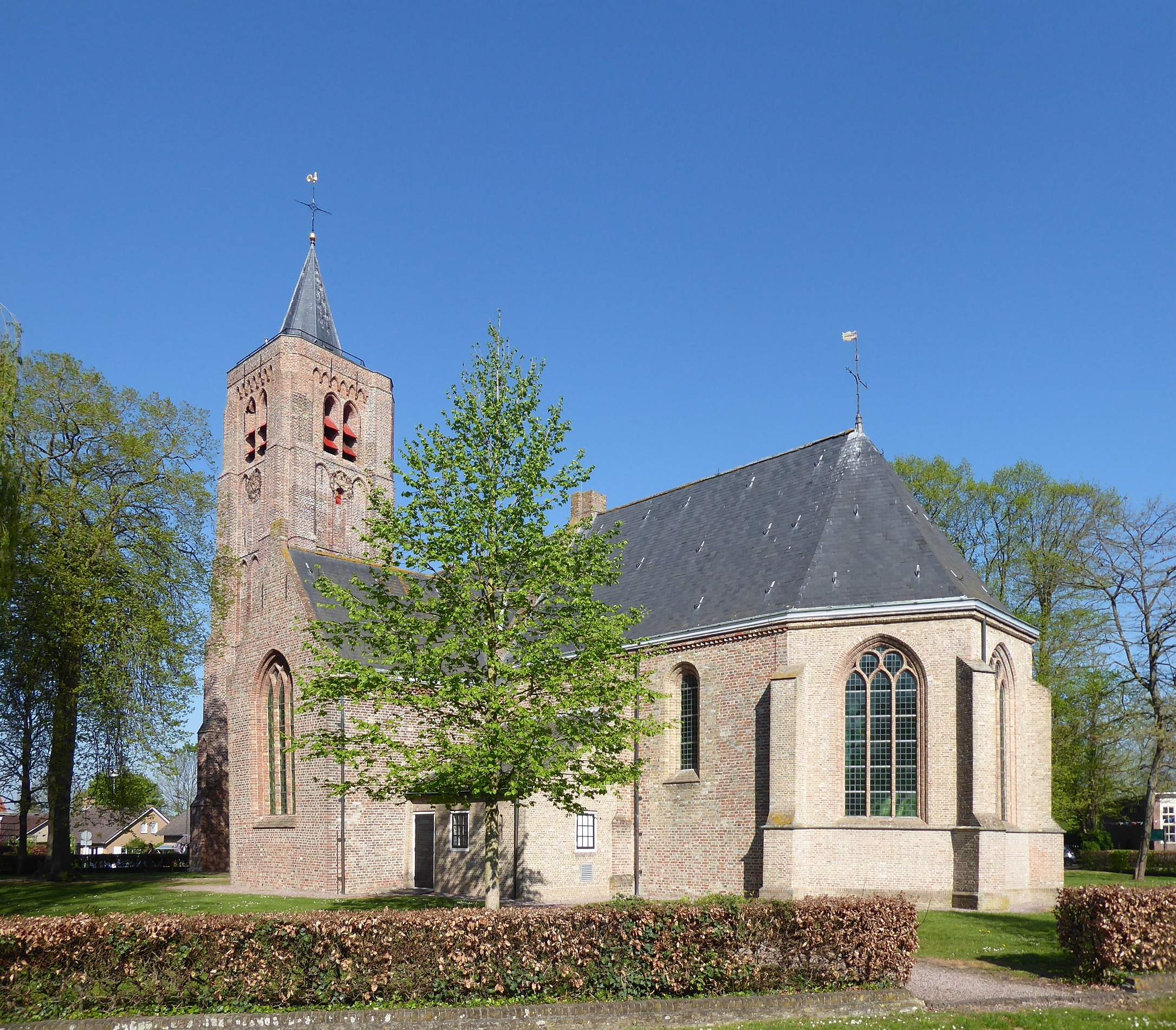
- John the Baptist church

- Coat of arms

- Location in the province of Zeeland in the Netherlands 's-Heer Abtskerke (Netherlands)
- Coordinates: 51°28′13″N 3°53′6″E
- Country: Netherlands
- Province: Zeeland
- Municipality: Borsele

Area
  - Total: 10.88 km^{2} (4.20 sq mi)
- Elevation: 0.1 m (0.33 ft)

Population (2021)
  - Total: 510
  - Density: 47/km^{2} (120/sq mi)
- Time zone: UTC+1 (CET)
  - Summer (DST): UTC+2 (CEST)
- Postal code: 4444
- Dialing code: 0113

's-Heer Abtskerke is a village in the Dutch province of Zeeland. It is a part of the municipality of Borsele, and lies about 19 km east of Middelburg.

== History ==
The village was first mentioned between 1197 and 1212 as Verscvliet. The current name means "church of lord abbot", and refers to the abbot of the Westmonster monastery in Middelburg. The abbot was given land near the village in 1203 by Dirk VII, Count of Holland. 's-Heer Abtskerke is a church village which developed in the Middle Ages.

The Dutch Reformed church was built in the 14th century. The tower was added in the middle of the 14th century. The tower was restored in 1955, and the church was restored between 1964 and 1968. There is well for cattle on the cemetery.

In 1816, the village of Sinoutskerke en Baarsdorp, covering the hamlets of Baarsdorp and Sinoutskerke, was merged with 's-Heer Abtskerke. 's-Heer Abtskerke was home to 295 people in 1840.

In 1927, a joint railway station with 's-Gravenpolder opened on the Goes to Hoedekenskerke. It closed in 1947. 's-Heer Abtskerke remained a separate municipality until 1970 when it was merged into Borsele. The school of the village closed in 2014.

== Gallery ==
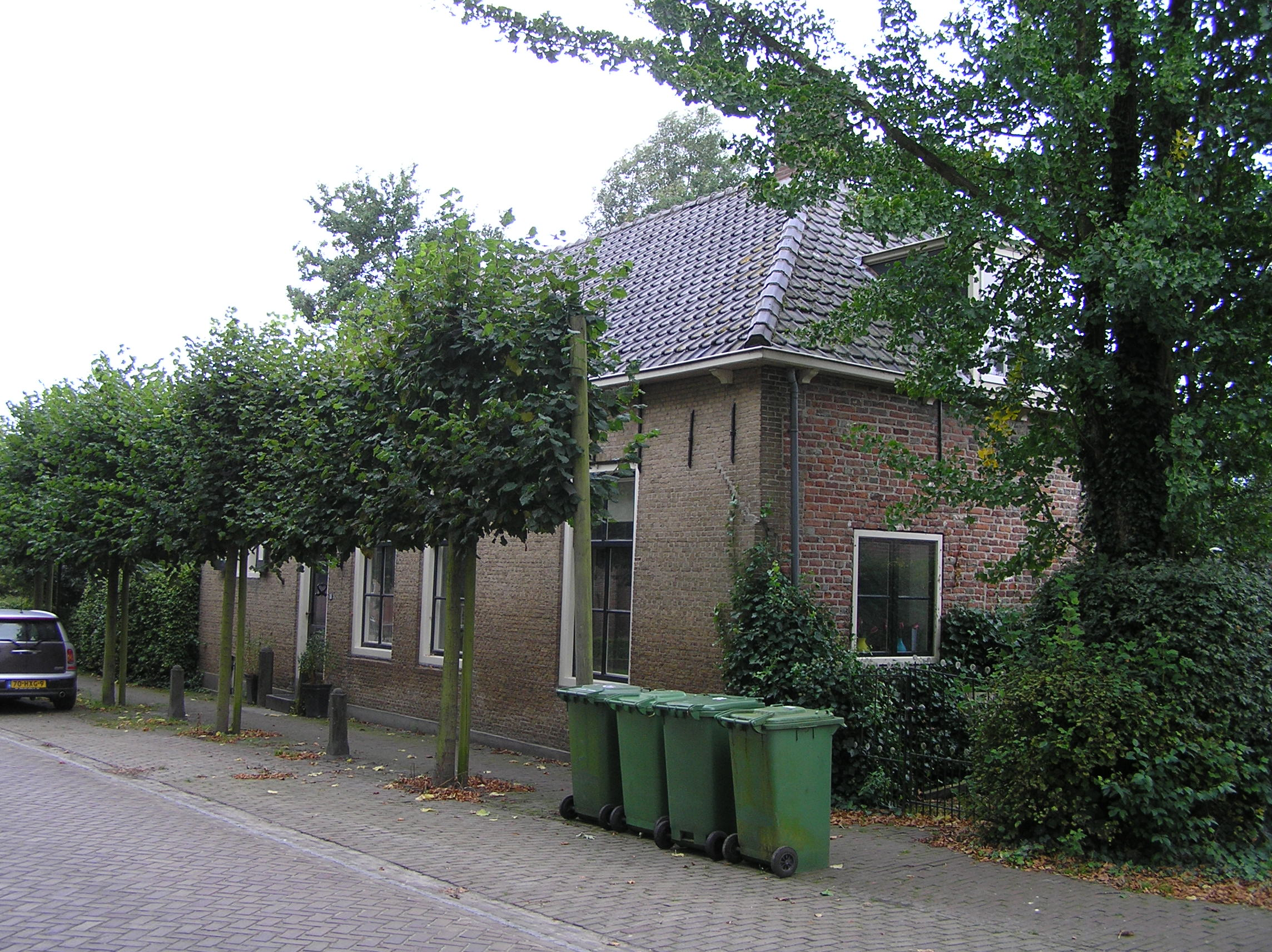
House in 's-Heer Abtskerke

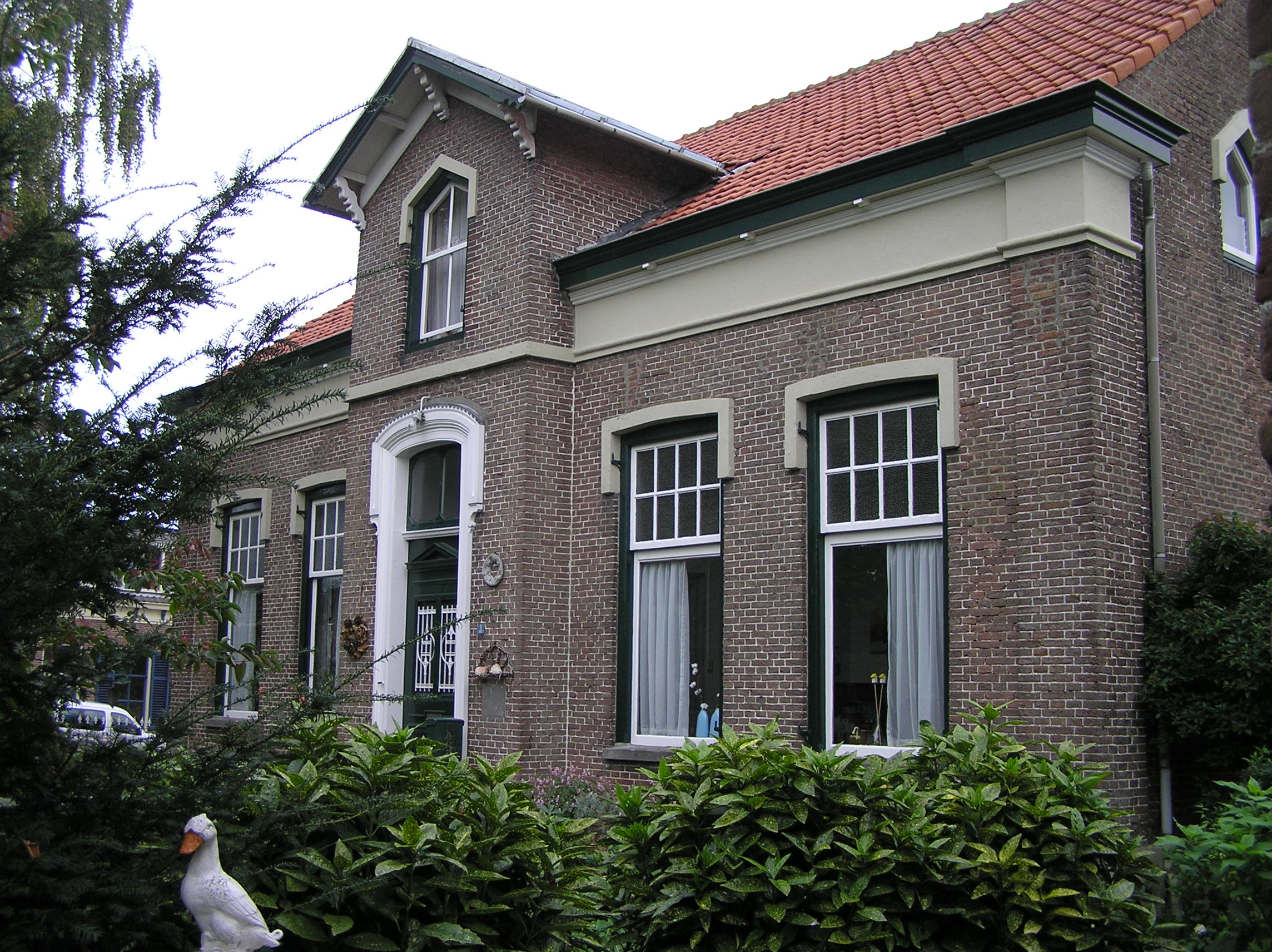
Clergy house

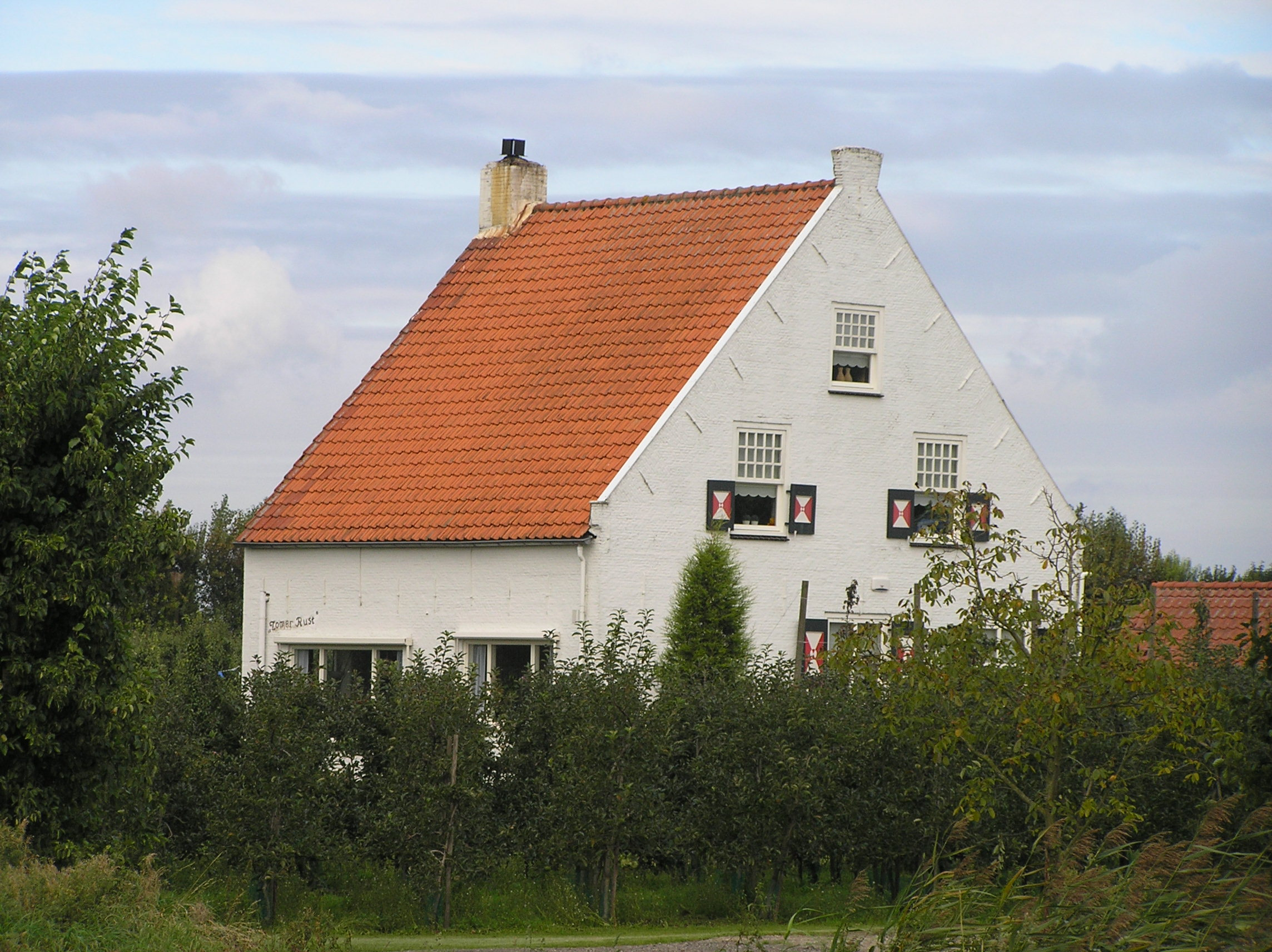
House in 's-Heer Abtskerke

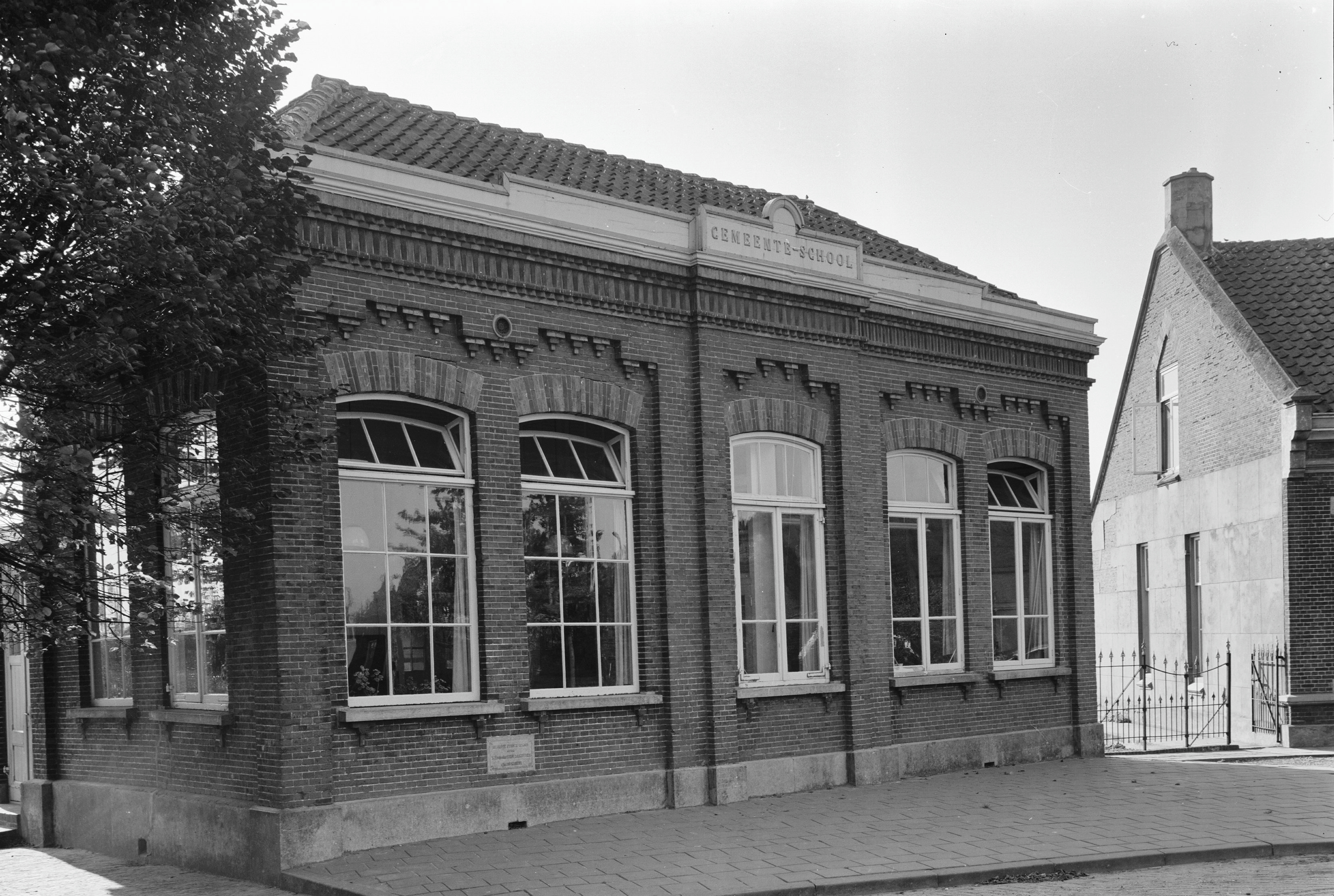
Former school (1964)
