= Åsetesrett =

Norwegian property inheritance law

Åsetesrett (archaic spelling Åsædesret) is one of the Ancient Norwegian property laws under which the eldest child has priority inheritance rights to agricultural property.

== Summary ==
Åsetesretten is a priority right to take over an agricultural property inheritance. When the farmer dies, only lineal descendants have inheritance rights to agricultural property. If there are several agricultural properties involved, the eldest child may choose only one parcel. The heir is obliged to pay the other siblings their share of the estate (originally only 50% to sisters). Traditionally, the value of the estate was given by the father or else is estimated, usually below its actual valuation. If the father left no son, his eldest surviving daughter inherited.

Before reforms of the 1970s, daughters did inherit, but their share was limited to one-half that of the sons' shares. Currently, there is an appraisal, but the value is typically low. If a farm or estate is of such a size that several families can exist on it, the father is allowed to divide it among his children; however, this is on the condition that the eldest son or daughter will not receive less than one-half of the farm or estate. This serves to limit the partitioning of agricultural farm land.

== See also ==
- Primogeniture

== Other sources ==
- Falkanger, Thor (1984) Odelsretten og åsetesretten (Oslo: Universitetsforlaget) ISBN 82-13-00595-3
- Rygg, Ola; Oluf Skarpnes (2002) Odelsloven med kommentarer (Oslo: Universitetsforlaget) ISBN 82-15-00267-6
