= Hoedekenskerke =

- Village
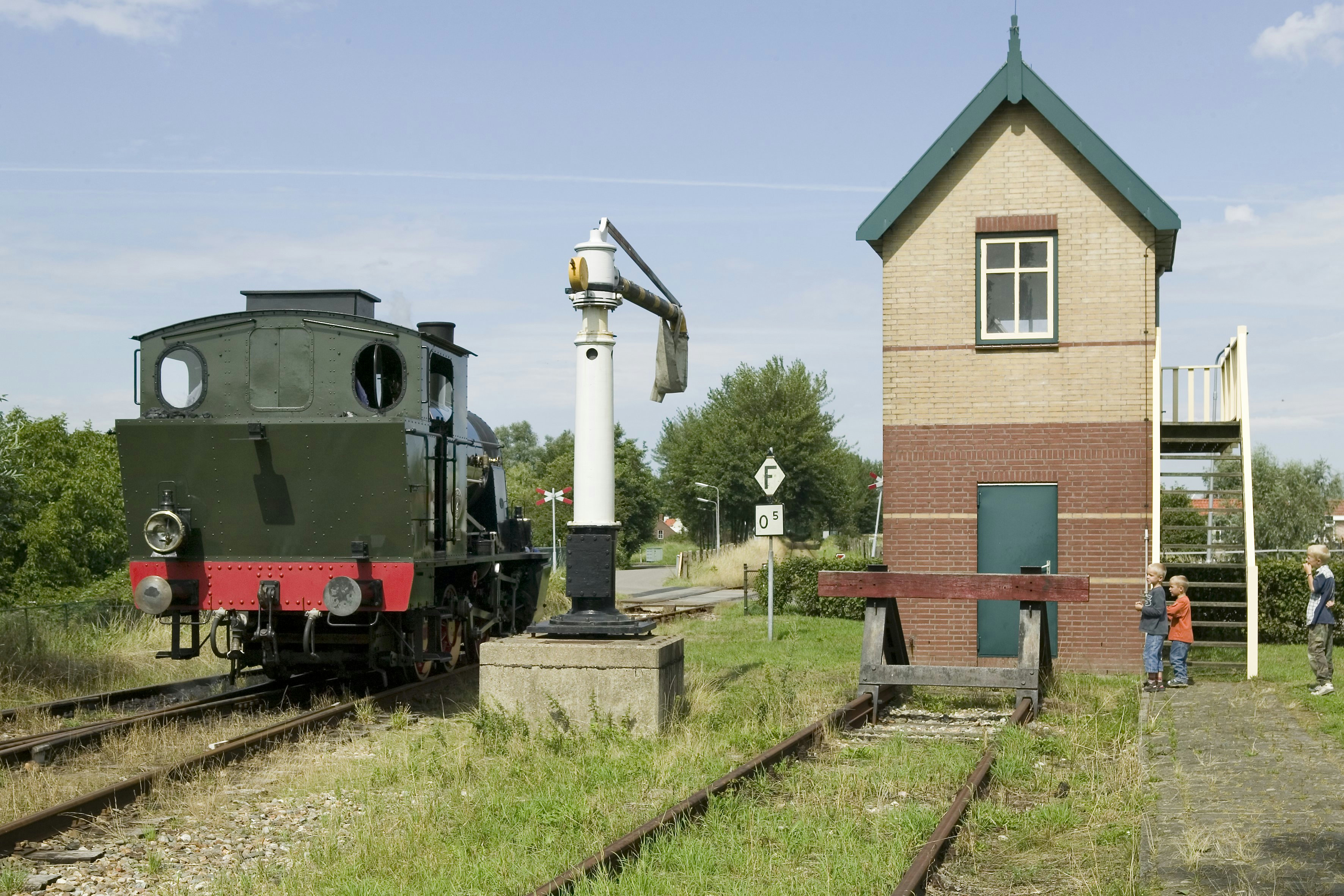
- Former railway station Hoedekenskerke

- Coat of arms

- Location in the province of Zeeland in the Netherlands Hoedekenskerke (Netherlands)
- Coordinates: 51°25′27″N 3°54′45″E
- Country: Netherlands
- Province: Zeeland
- Municipality: Borsele

Area
  - Total: 6.14 km^{2} (2.37 sq mi)
- Elevation: 0.0 m (0 ft)

Population (2021)
  - Total: 715
  - Density: 116/km^{2} (302/sq mi)
- Time zone: UTC+1 (CET)
  - Summer (DST): UTC+2 (CEST)
- Postal code: 4433
- Dialing code: 0113

Hoedekenskerke is a village in the Dutch province of Zeeland. It is a part of the municipality of Borsele, and lies about 22 km east of Middelburg.

== History ==
The village was first mentioned around 1280 as Hoedekinskerke, and means "(private) church of Oedekin (Oede)". Hoedekenskerke is a road village along the Westerschelde which developed in the 12th century. In 1454, a ferry to Terneuzen was established. The ferry service closed in 1972.

The Dutch Reformed church dated from the 15th century. Around 1850, it was rebuilt and only the original choir remained. The church was damaged during World War II, and restored between 1948 and 1949.

The grist mill De Koutermolen was built in 1874. It remained in service until 1964. It was used as a holiday home and the interior was removed. In 1995, it was bought by Borngräber from Cologne and restored. The distance proved too great, and it was put up for sale in 2005. It was bought by a foundation in 2007, and returned to active service in 2008.

Hoedekenskerke was home to 481 people in 1840. In 1927 a railway station was opened on the Goes to Hoedekenskerke railway line. It was damaged in 1944 and closed in 1947. The railway station reopened in 1990 as a museum line.

Hoedekenskerke was a separate municipality until 1970 when it was merged into Borsele.

It has historic house museum and shop Wienkeltje van Wullempje that recreates daily life from the 1930s–1950s based on former residents.

== Gallery ==
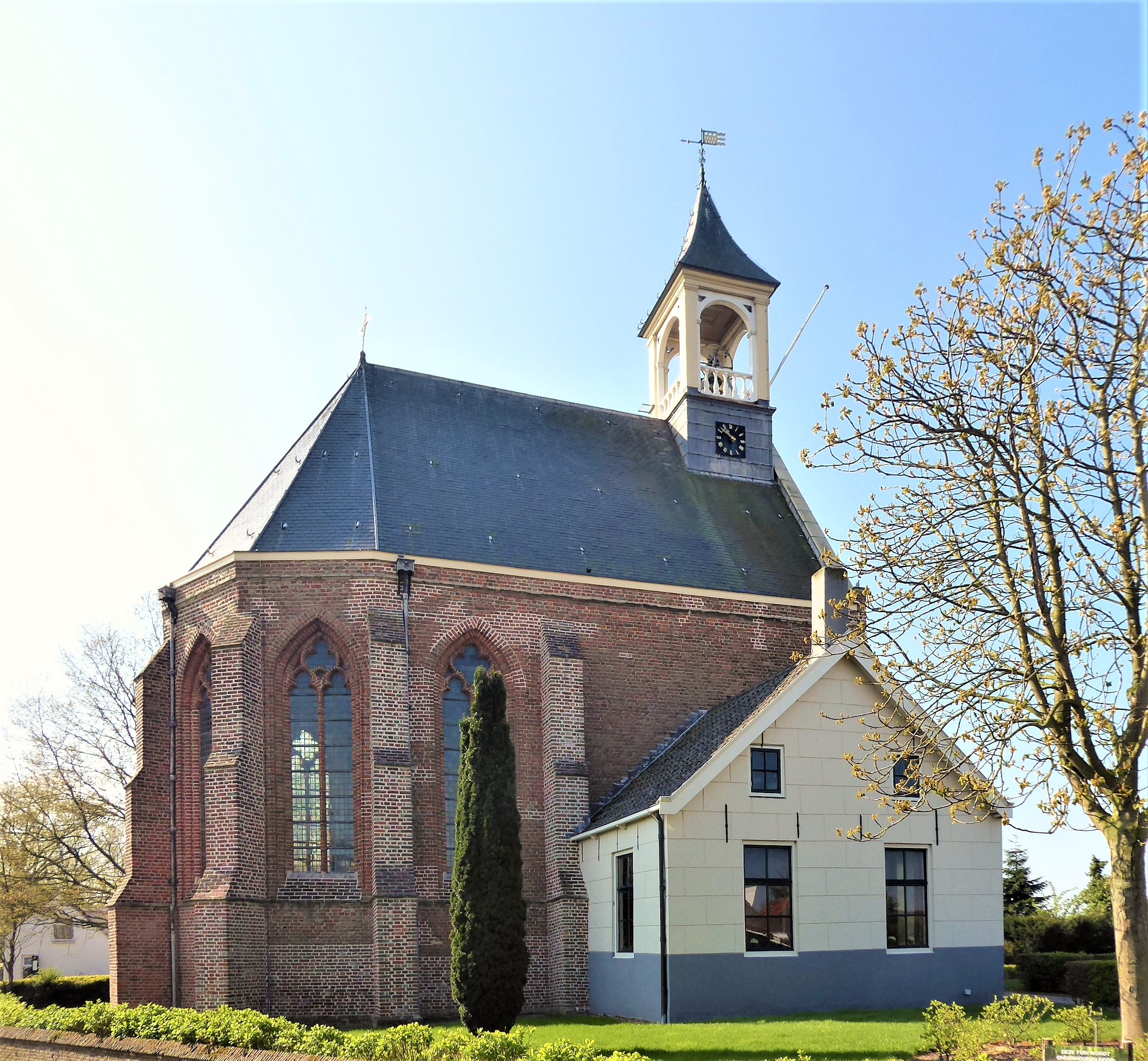
St Joris Church

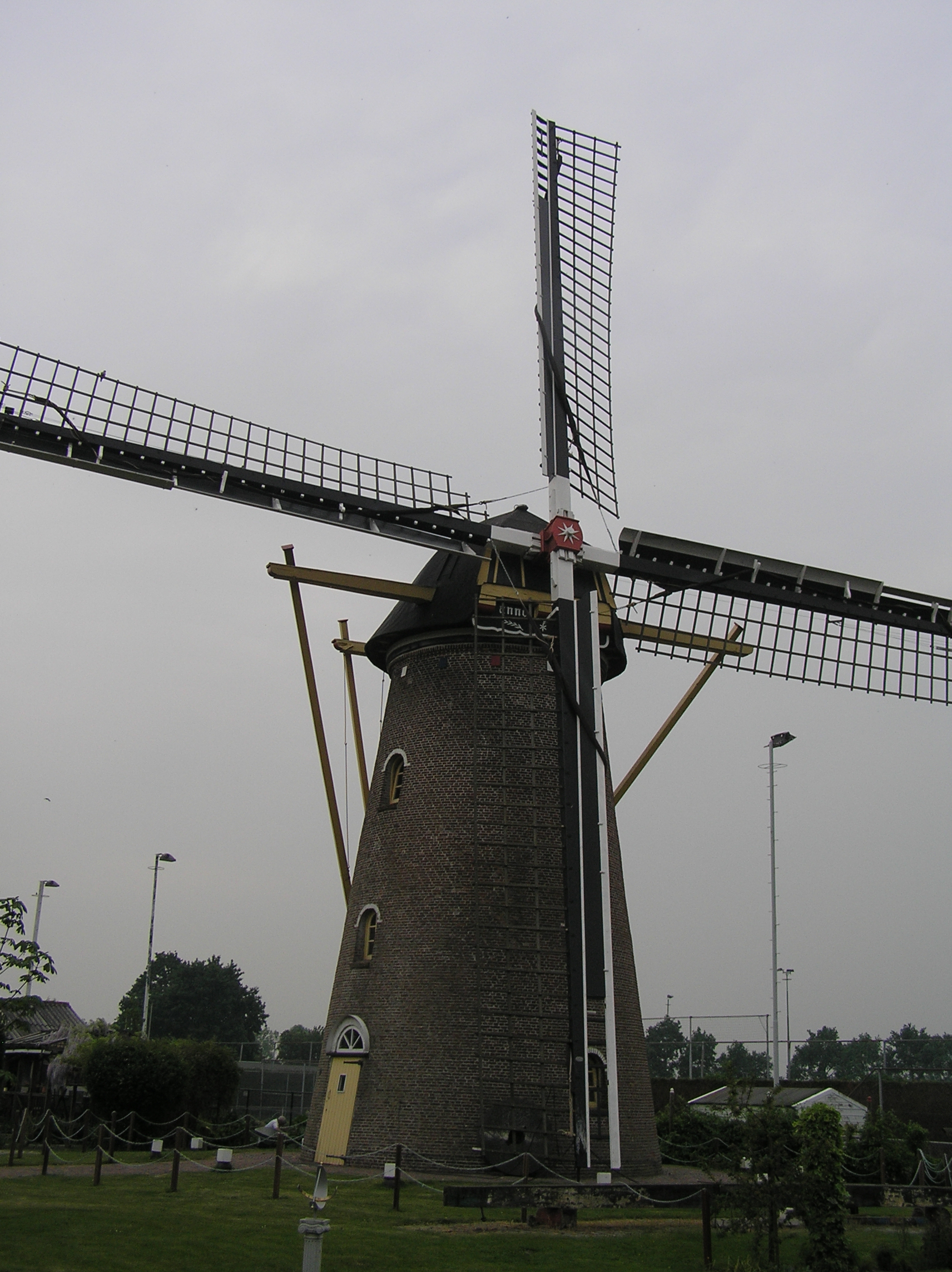
Wind mill Koutermolen

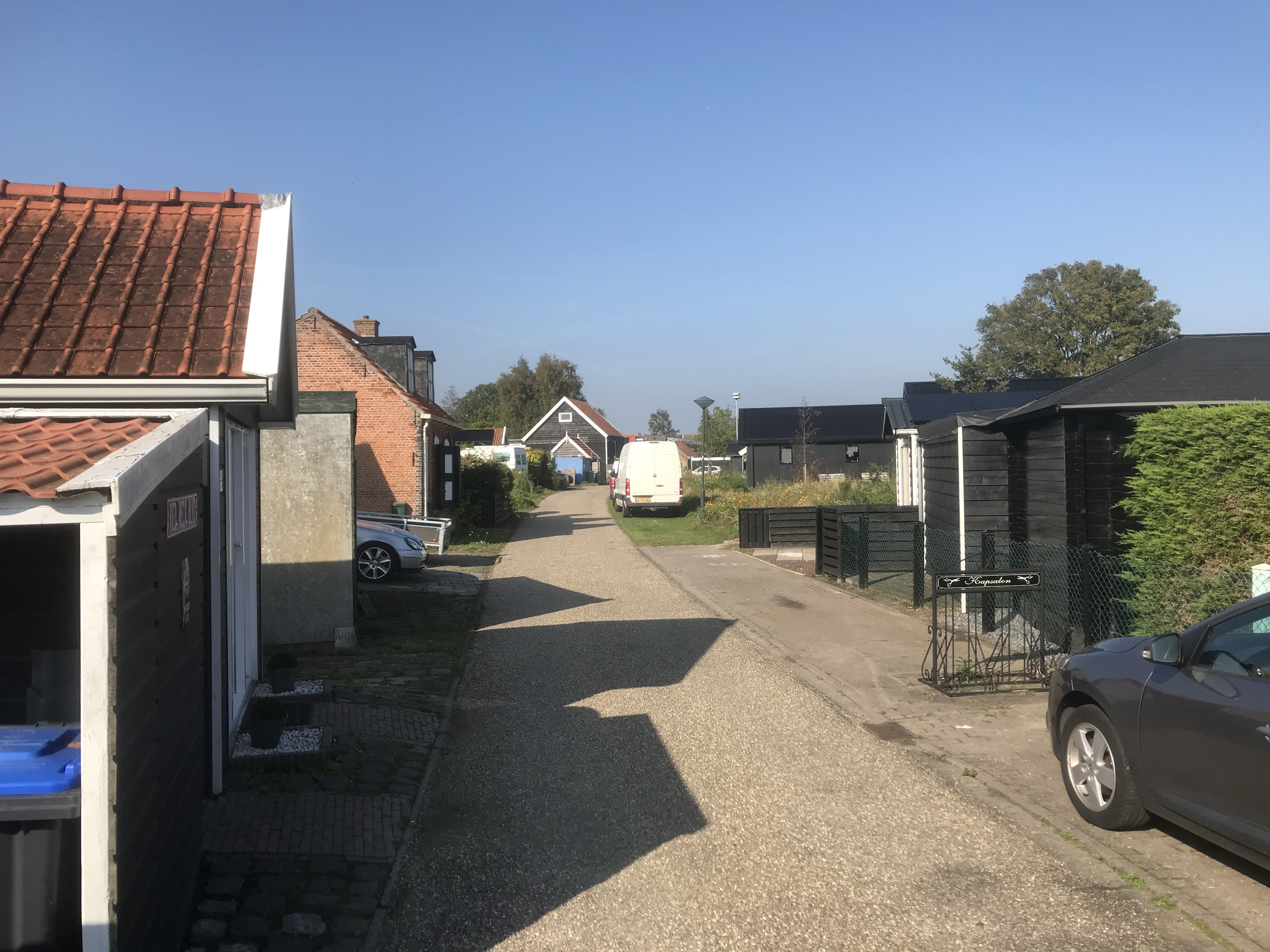
Street view

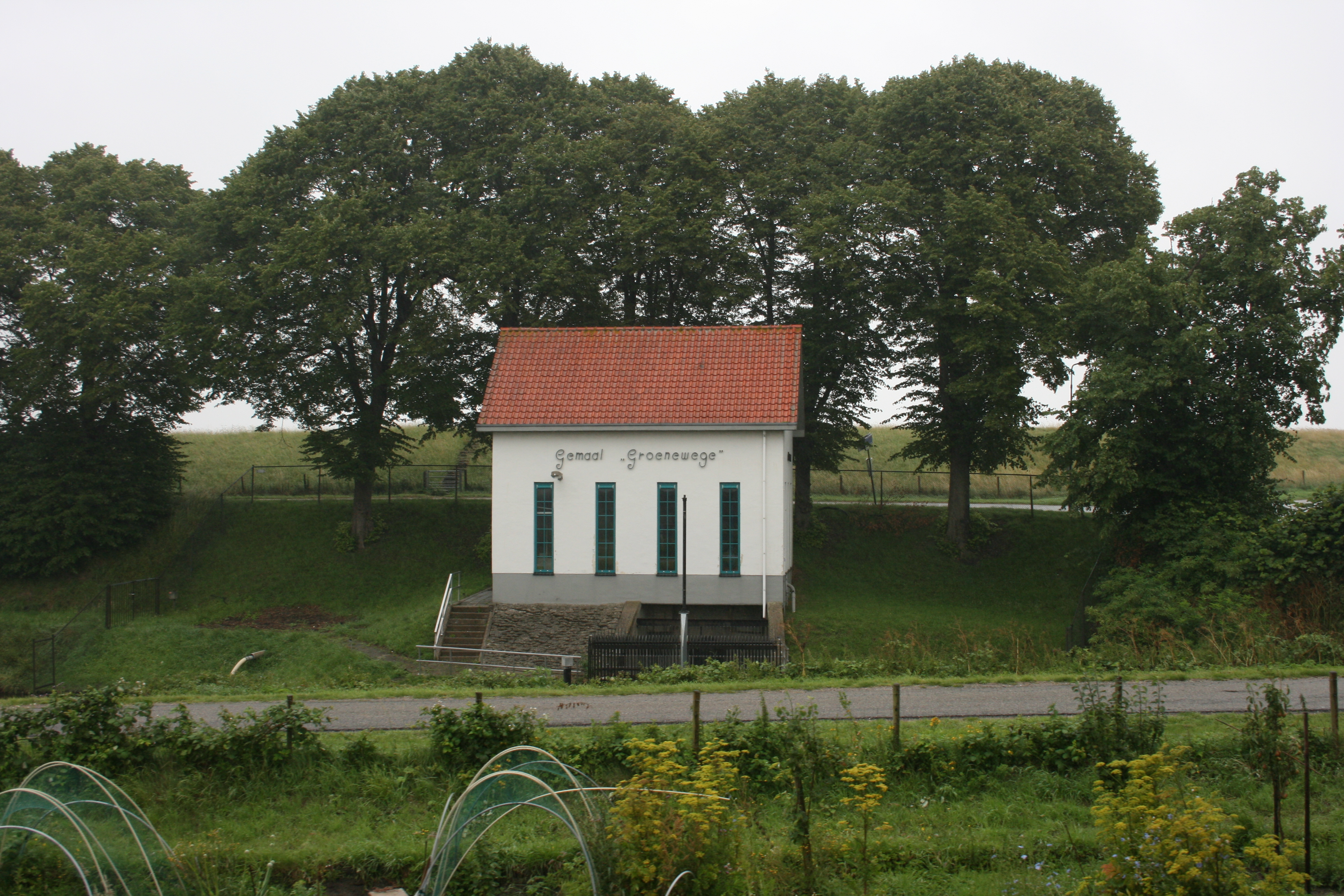
Pumping station Groenewege
