= Allodial title =

Ownership independent of a superior

Allodial title constitutes ownership of real property (land, buildings, and fixtures) that is independent of any superior landlord. Allodial title is related to the concept of land held "in allodium", or land ownership by occupancy and defense of the land.

Most property ownership in common law jurisdictions is fee simple. In the United States, the land is subject to eminent domain by federal, state and local government, and subject to the imposition of taxes by state and/or local governments, and there is thus no true allodial land. Some states within the United States (notably, Nevada and Texas) have provisions for considering land allodial under state law, and the term may be used in other circumstances. Land is "held of the Crown" in England and Wales and other jurisdictions in the Commonwealth realms. Some land in the Orkney and Shetland Islands, known as udal land, is held in a manner akin to allodial land in that these titles are not subject to the ultimate ownership of the Crown.

In France, while allodial title existed before the French Revolution, it was rare and limited to ecclesiastical properties and property that had fallen out of feudal ownership. After the French Revolution, allodial title became the norm in France and other civil law countries that were under Napoleonic legal influences. In October 1854, the seigneurial system of Lower Canada, which had been ceded from France to Britain in 1763 at the conclusion of the Seven Years' War, was extinguished by the Seigneurial Tenures Abolition Act of October 1854, and a form similar to socage replaced it.

Property owned under allodial title is referred to as allodial land, allodium, or an allod. In the Domesday Book of 1086 it is called alod. Historically, allodial title was sometimes used to distinguish ownership of land without feudal duties from ownership by feudal tenure which restricted alienation and burdened land with the tenurial rights of a landholder's overlord or sovereign.

== Legal concept ==
Allodial lands are the absolute property of their owner and not subject to any rent, service, or acknowledgment to a superior. Allodial title is therefore an alternative to feudal land tenure. However, historian J. C. Holt states that "In Normandy the word alodium, whatever its sense in other parts of the Continent, meant not land held free of seigneurial services, but land held by hereditary right", and that "alodium and feodum should be given the same meaning in England".

Allodium, meaning "land exempt from feudal duties", is first attested in English-language texts in the 11th-century Domesday Book (written in Latin), but was borrowed from Old Low Franconian *allōd, meaning "full property", and attested in Latin as e.g., alodis, alaudes, in the Salic law (c. A.D. 507–596) and other Germanic laws. The word is a compound of *all "whole, full" and *ōd "estate, property" (cf. Old Saxon ōd, Old English ead, Old Norse auðr). Allodial tenure seems to have been common throughout northern Europe, but is now unknown in common law jurisdictions apart from the United States, Scotland and the Isle of Man. An allod could be converted into a fief, by the owner surrendering it to a lord and receiving it back as a fief. Allodial land title is common in the Isle of Man which has laws with Nordic origins. A version called udal tenure exists in the Orkney and Shetland Islands, also of Nordic origin. These are the only parts of the United Kingdom where allodial title exists, with the few exceptions. One such exception is the Scottish Barony of the Bachuil, which is not of feudal origin like other baronies but is allodial in that it predates (A.D. 562) Scotland itself and the feudal system, dating from the Gaelic Kingdom of Dál Riata. In recognition as allodial Barons par le Grâce de Dieu not barons by a feudal crown grant, the Baron of the Bachuil has the only coat of arms in Scotland granted a cap of maintenance with a "vair" (squirrel fur) lining (as opposed to ermine) by the Lord Lyon Court. Another exception is Somerset House which was vested in His Majesty explicitly not in fee simple, and is held to be allodial.

=== Development of equitable title ===
As late as the Tudor period, in order to avoid estate taxes, a legal loophole was exploited where land was willed to a trustee for the use of the beneficiary. However, trustees often abused this privilege, and heirs found that the courts of common law would refuse to recognize the "use" clause, and would instead grant title in law to the trustee. However, the courts of equity, which were developed by the sovereign to deal with obvious injustices in the common law courts, ruled that the heirs were entitled to the use of the property, and gave them title in equity. As rulings of equity courts ranked above those of common law courts, this gave heirs the use of the land, but not title to it in the common law.

However, this distinction between common law and equity title helped develop forms of security based on the distinction, now known as the mortgage. Enjoyment of the property during the period where the mortgage was in good standing could be assured through the equity courts, while the right to foreclose on the property to merge the common law and equity title were guaranteed in the common law courts.

=== Proof of ownership ===
Until the 18th century, almost all common law property ownership depended on proving a link of possession from a royal grant of title to the property owner. Although the feudal system had ceased from England in 1660, and is now fee simple taxation, in theory the feudal chain of title still exists, although it is a formality.

However, proving ownership in the absence of the documents was an impossibility, and forgeries of crown grants were common and difficult to detect. Moreover, it was nearly impossible to determine if land was subject to common law encumbrances (i.e. mortgages). This led to the establishment in the 18th century of land registry systems, where a central office in each county was responsible for the filing of land deeds, mortgages, liens and other evidence of ownership, transfer or encumbrance. Under land registry, deeds and charges were not recognized unless they were filed, and persons who filed were given priority over previous transactions that had not been filed. Moreover, under statutes of limitation, in certain jurisdictions only documents that had been filed in the past 40 years had to be consulted to determine the chain of ownership.

== United States ==
Before 1774, all land in the American colonies could also be traced to royal grants, either a single enormous grant creating each proprietary colony (e.g. Pennsylvania and Maryland), or smaller direct grants within crown colonies (e.g. Virginia). The original grantee (recipient of the land) then sold or granted parcels of land within his grant to private citizens and other legal entities. The Treaty of Paris (1783), which ended formal hostilities and recognized American independence, also had the effect of ending any residual rights held by the original grantees or the Crown. This recognized that no person holding land in the new United States owed any allegiance or duty to the Crown.

Apart from land that was formally owned at the time of the Revolutionary War, most American landholders can trace their title back to grants by the federal or state governments of land obtained by purchase (Louisiana Purchase, Florida, Alaska), treaty (the Ohio Valley, New Mexico, Arizona, and California), or annexation (Texas, Hawaii). However, in reality, grants made prior to those territories becoming U.S. possessions were recognized; ownership under French and Spanish crown grants in the Louisiana Purchase and Guadalupe-Hidalgo/Gadsden territories remained valid. Although in Dartmouth College v. Woodward the United States Supreme Court rebuffed New Hampshire's attempt to convert Dartmouth College from a private college into a public university, the Court decided this was based on the Constitution prohibiting states from impairing the obligations of the contract which created the private corporation that owned the land, and not based on any principle that the land was somehow immune from state control.

Many state constitutions (Arkansas, Wisconsin, Minnesota, New York) refer to allodial title, but only to clearly distinguish it from feudal title. The conditions under which the government can compel the sale of privately owned real property for public necessity are established by eminent domain laws of either the federal or state governments, respectively. The Fifth Amendment to the United States Constitution requires just compensation for eminent domain compelled sale. In addition, the government powers of police power and escheat have been retained in the American legal system.

=== Limited allodial title ===
Other institutional property ownership can also be called allodial, in that property granted for certain uses is held absolutely and cannot be alienated in most circumstances. For example, universities and colleges that hold property for educational purposes can be described as having allodial title. In most states, property held by churches or other FBOs for the purpose of worship also has status similar to allodial title. Native American reservations also share some similarity with allodial title. However, in all these cases, it is also clear that if the title ceases to be used for the purposes for which it was granted, it reverts to the state or the federal government.

==== Nevada ====
In 1997, the Nevada Legislature created a new section of statutes within the property tax statutory scheme. Nevada Revised Statutes (NRS) 361.900 to 361.920. These statutes, which are entitled "Allodial Title", became effective on 1 July 1998, and were intended to protect property owners from the burden of the high increases in property taxes that often occur when unincorporated land becomes part of a town or city. Nevada allowed persons who owned and lived in single family residences to obtain allodial title if the property was not mortgaged and had no tax liens. Allodial titles were subject to exemptions from seizure in debt or bankruptcy under homestead laws; however, a property could be seized if used in a criminal enterprise. In 2005, the Nevada Legislature prohibited applications by property owner for an allodial title after June 13 of that year.

The classes of persons who can apply for allodial title and of property for which those persons may obtain allodial title are limited: A person who owns and occupies a single-family dwelling, its appurtenances and the land on which it is located, free and clear of all encumbrances, except any unpaid assessment for a public improvement, may apply to the county assessor to establish allodial title to the dwellings, appurtenances and the land on which it is located. One or more persons who own such a home in any form of joint ownership may apply for the allodial title, jointly if the dwelling is occupied by each person included in the application.

After the county assessor receives the application, he transfers it to the state treasurer.

The state treasurer then determines the amount which is required to be paid by the property owner to establish allodial title. This is done by using "a tax rate of $5 for each $100 of assessed valuation on the date of the application". The treasurer must calculate, separately, the amount that must be paid in a lump sum, and for the payment in instalments over a period of not more than 10 years. These "amounts must be calculated to the best ability of the state treasurer so that the money paid plus the interest or other income earned on that money will be adequate to pay all future tax liability of the property for a period equal to the life expectancy of the youngest titleholder of the property".

If the property owner pays the lump sum amount calculated by the state treasurer, and submits proof that the home is a single-family dwelling occupied by the homeowner, and that the property is free and clear of all encumbrances except any unpaid assessment for a public improvement, "the state treasurer shall issue a certificate of allodial title". If the property owner enters into an agreement with the state to make instalment payments (in lieu of a lump sum payment), the issue of a certificate of allodial title occurs upon the receipt by the treasurer of the last payment.

Once a property owner receives a certificate of allodial title, he is relieved from the payment of all further property taxes, "unless the allodial title is relinquished by the homeowner or his heirs". Instead, the state treasurer is responsible for the payment of the taxes due.

Once allodial title is established, it "is valid for as long as the homeowner continues to own the residence unless he chooses to relinquish the allodial title". Upon the death of an allodial title holder, the heir or heirs can reestablish allodial title by using the same procedure that the original property owner used.

The holder of an allodial title can voluntarily relinquish it at any time. The title shall be relinquished if the property is sold, leased or transferred by the allodial title holder; the allodial title holder no longer occupies the dwelling for 150 days; or the home is converted to anything other than a single-family dwelling occupied by the owner. If allodial title is relinquished, either voluntarily or otherwise, the property owner receives a refund of the unused portion of the payments made to originally establish the allodial title. Once the allodial title is relinquished, the property owner is once again responsible for all future property taxes.

The importance and benefit of establishing allodial title extends beyond the non-payment of property taxes. It also has significance in the area of homestead law. Pursuant to NRS 115.010, the available homestead exemption in Nevada is $605,000. However, if allodial title has been established and not relinquished, the homestead exemption "extends to all equity in the dwelling, its appurtenances and the land on which it is located". Furthermore, although the regular homestead exemption provides no protection against legal process to enforce the payment of obligations contracted for the purchase of the property, or for improvements made thereon (including any mechanic's lien lawfully obtained), or for legal taxes, or for any mortgage or deed of trust executed upon the property, the holder of an allodial title is fully exempt from all of these under the homestead laws. The only area within the homestead laws wherein allodial title fails to provide an extra benefit is in the realm of civil and criminal forfeiture of property. Similar to all property in Nevada, property held by allodial title is subject to forfeiture for criminal conduct.

== See also ==
- Allod – Historic type of land estate
- Assarting – Clearing of forested lands for use in agriculture or other purposes
- Frälse – Socially privileged class in Sweden
- Land tenure – Legal regime in which area owned by an individual is held by another person
- Lord paramount – Feudal overlord: a lord with no obligations to a higher lord
- Manorialism – Economic, political, and judicial institution during the Middle Ages in Europe
- Mark system
- Microstate – Sovereign state having a very small population or very small land area
- Nulle terre sans seigneur – Principle of feudal systems
- Numa Denis Fustel de Coulanges – French historian and religious scholar (1830–1889)
- Odellsrett – Scandinavian family land laws
- Property tax in the United States
- Quia Emptores – English statute of 1290
- Serfdom – Status of peasants under feudalism
- Slander of title
- Torrens title – Land registration and land transfer system

== Sources ==
- Otto Brunner: Land und Herrschaft: Grundfragen der territorialen Verfassungsgeschichte Österreichs im Mittelalter. Darmstadt 1984 (unveränderter Nachdruck der 5. Auflage von 1965).
- K. H. Burmeister: "Allod". In: Norbert Angermann (Hrsg.): Lexikon des Mittelalters. Bd. 1. München [u.a.] 1980.
- William Bennett Munro, 1907, The Seigneurial System in Canada: A study in French Colonial Policy Harvard Historical Studies, Vol. XII, Harvard University Press, Cambridge, Massachusetts.
