= Lordship of Oñate =

Lordship of Lopez de Oñate Señorío de Oñate Oñatiko jaurreria
- c. 1149–1845
- Status: Vassal first of the Kingdom of Navarre, then of the Kingdom of Castile
- Capital: Oñati
- Government: Lordship
- Historical era: Middle Ages
  - Established: c. 1149
  - Incorporation of Oñate into Gipuzkoa: 1845
Preceded by	Succeeded by
Kingdom of Pamplona	Oñati

The Lordship of Lopez de Oñate (Basque: Oñatiko jaurreria, Spanish: Señorío de Oñate) was one of the Basque señoríos, and represented a period of feudal rule in a region surrounding the city of Oñati, in the present-day province of Gipuzkoa, Basque Country. The lordship was ruled by a single family, the House of Guevara (in Basque, Gebara), who all hailed from the town with the same name in Álava. Their titles as Lords of Oñati were first conferred by the monarchs of Navarre, as the Lordship acted as a vassal state of the former. Circa the year 1200, the Lordship was conquered and annexed by the Kingdom of Castile, but it was maintained until the year 1845, when Oñate was incorporated into the province of Gipuzkoa and the title was lost.

== History ==
Not much is known about the origins of the lordship itself as a political entity. The lordship is mentioned for the first time in a text from 1284, although some latter documents (dated in the 15th century) state that the majorat over the land around Oñati was given to the Guevara family in the year 1149. The House of Guevara came from a village with the same name located in what then was part of the Kingdom of Navarre. The family had important contacts with the Navarrese monarchy and had been supporters of the Gamboino faction during the War of the Bands. The lordship had strong links with the County of Álava and remained a vassal territory of Navarre until the year 1200, when Gipuzkoa and Álava itself were conquered by the Kingdom of Castile. From that point and until its dissolution, the lordship was under the sphere of influence of Castile, and it was eventually integrated into the kingdom, along with other Basque feudal lordships such as the Lordship of Biscay.

In the year 1481, the Catholic Monarchs confirmed the lands and title as Count of Oñate to Íñigo Vélez of Guevara and Ayala, 13th Lord of Oñate-

The Lordship of Oñate was dissolved and the title lost when Oñati was officially incorporated into the province of Gipuzkoa as a town in 1845.

== Lords ==
Lord of Oñate or Count of Oñate was the title granted to those who ruled the Lordship of Oñate. Every lord of Oñate has belonged to the Guevara family and Lopez family.

== See also ==
- Basque señoríos
