= Lordship of Sinoutskerke and Baarsdorp =

Coats of arms of the lordship of Baarsdorp (Heerlijkheid Baarsdorp)

The Lordship of Baarsdorp is a (former) Dutch Lordship situated in the province of Zeeland, in the Netherlands.

== Short history ==
The lordship of Baarsdorp is a Dutch landed estate. Until 1795, a Dutch lordship (Heerlijkheid) was the Dutch version of manorialism; currently, it's an estate on land with a set of remaining manorial rights.

The lordship of Baarsdorp was founded between 1206 and 1270, the first lords were Lord Petrus de Barsdorpe and his brother, Lord Dankert de Barsdorpe. The de Barsdorpe brothers were members of the Dutch noble family van Borssele, who named themselves after the lordship. The brothers built a castle and a church, which gave the lordship and village of Baarsdorp a more prestigious aura. The lordship of Baarsdorp remained in this family for the next 200 years, until in the fifteenth century the noble family van de Waerde became the owners. From then on, the lordships of Baarsdorp and Sinoutskerke were owned by the same people but never formally merged. A hundred years later, the castle was demolished after being left empty for two decades. In 1846, the lordship of Baarsdorp was owned by seven people.

The manorial rights are still being exercised by the van Huykelom van de Pas family, who are the current owners of the lordship. Baarsdorp is one of the very few remaining lordships in the Netherlands with existing rights attached to it. Among those rights are fishing rights, sheep drifting and the right to plant trees, etc. on the sides of the roads. M.J. van Huykelom van de Pas also uses the title "Lady of Baarsdorp".

== Coat of arms ==
The coat of arms of the lordship of Baarsdorp is mentioned in 1696 in Mattheus Smallegange's “Cronyk van Zeeland” (Chronicle of Zeeland). According to Smallegange, the coat of arms of the lordship of Baarsdorp initially were the coat of arms of a branch of the van Borssele family, and adopted by the lordship after this family died out. Similar coat of arms were later also used by the municipality of Sinoutskerke and Baarsdorp, with permission of the Dutch High Council of Nobility.
