= Culture of Sussex =

The Flag of Sussex is based on a design that dates back to at least 1622

The culture of Sussex is the pattern of human activity and symbolism associated with Sussex and its people. It is informed by Sussex's history as an Anglo-Saxon kingdom, English county, diocese of the church and present-day cultural region.

Sometimes thought by outsiders to be some sort of rural adjunct to London, Sussex has a cultural identity as unique as any other English county. The last Anglo-Saxon kingdom to be Christianised, Sussex has a centuries-old reputation for being separate and culturally distinct from the rest of England. This relative isolation until recent times is due to Sussex's geography, with the sea to the south, the forest and sticky clays of the Weald to the north and coastal marshes to the east and west. Sussex escaped the wholesale rearrangements of life and customs which the Norse invasions brought to much of England and the Germanic culture of the South Saxons remained much more intact than that of the rest of England. The people of Sussex have a reputation for independence of thought and an aversion to being pushed around, as expressed through the Sussex motto, We wunt be druv. The reputation for independence also extends to admiration of the independence of others and toleration of others. Other regional characterisations include the sharp shrewd stubborn Sussex Wealdsman and the more deferential Sussex Downsman.

Sussex is known for its strong tradition of bonfire celebrations and its proud musical heritage. Sussex in the first half of the 20th century was a major centre for modernism, and saw many radical artists and writers move to its seaside towns and countryside. The county is home to the Brighton Festival and the Brighton Fringe, England's largest arts festival. Brighton Pride is one of the UK's largest and oldest gay pride parades and other pride events take place at most other major towns including Crawley, Eastbourne, Hastings and Worthing. Chichester is home to the Chichester Festival Theatre and Pallant House Gallery. The feast day of Sussex's patron saint, St Richard of Chichester, 16 June, has been observed since 2007 as Sussex Day to celebrate the county's culture and history.

== Architecture ==
Sussex's building materials reflect its geology, consisting of flint on and near the South Downs and sandstone in the Weald. Brick is used across the county, with some regional variation. In the 18th and 19th centuries, Brighton and Lewes both developed black glazed bricks and Worthing developed pale yellow bricks. A composite building material known as bungaroosh was used from the mid-18th to late-19th centuries in the south of the county between Worthing and Lewes, and most especially in Brighton and Hove, but is little-known elsewhere.

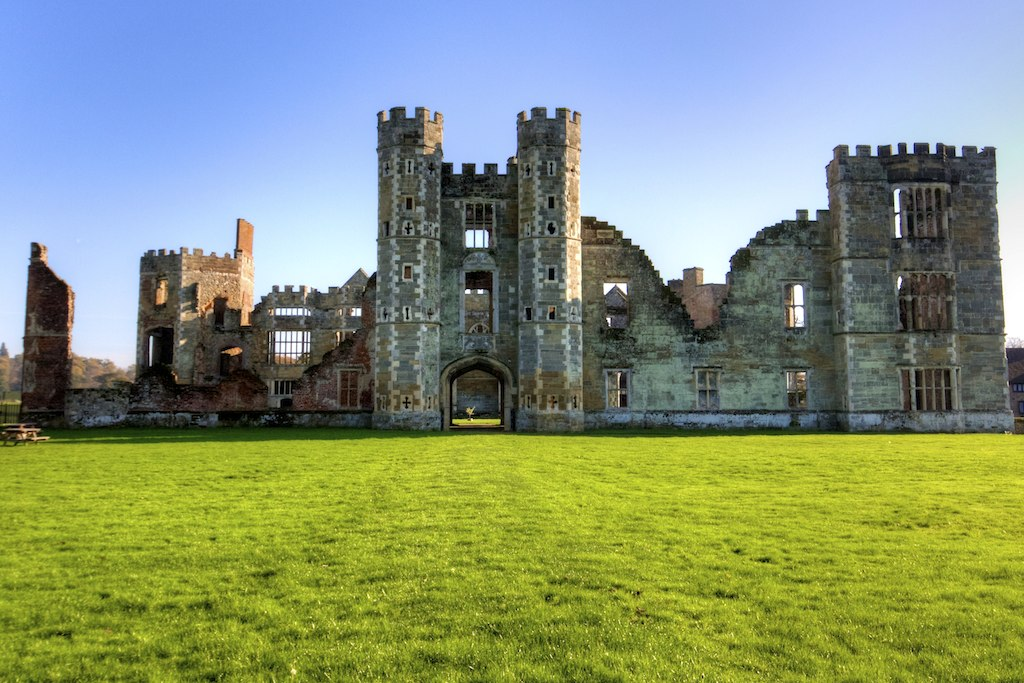
Ruins of Cowdray House, Midhurst

Typically conservative and moderate, the architecture of Sussex also has elaborate and eccentric buildings rarely matched elsewhere in England including the Saxon Church of St Mary the Blessed Virgin, Sompting; Castle Goring, which has a front and rear of entirely different styles; and Brighton's Indo-Saracenic Royal Pavilion.

Rare elsewhere, but common in Sussex is the Sussex cap, a type of blunt pyramidal roof of red tiles on a church tower. Another architectural feature strongly associated with Sussex is the tapsel gate, a type of wooden gate found only in the county. Also typical of Sussex is the heave-gate (often pronounced simply 'e'gate) as an effective stockproof barrier at a field entrance or between fields. Made with two horizontal rails connected by several vertical rails with two diagonal bracing rails, it is heaved into place by feeding the two horizontal rails into two larger holes in one gate post, and then heaved in the other direction tightly into two smaller holes in the other gate post.<https://www.facebook.com/photo.php?fbid=10218449008805079&set=p.10218449008805079&type=1&theater> From the seventeenth century, a type of building material called 'mathematical tiles' were used, and their use in Sussex became very common in the closing years of the 18th century. The architectural feature known as the 'boat porch' is a type of ogee-arched rendered porch found only in Worthing.

Important Norman architecture in Sussex includes Chichester Cathedral, the ruins of Lewes Priory and Battle Abbey as well as Norman remains in the castles at Arundel, Bramber, Lewes, Pevensey and Hastings. From the medieval period, there are numerous examples of the Wealden hall house, especially in the east of the Sussex Weald. Some of Sussex's atmospheric stately homes include Herstmonceux Castle, Tudor Cowdray House, Elizabethan Parham House, Petworth House and Uppark. Important works from the 20th century include the International style De la Warr Pavilion, and Chichester Festival Theatre and University of Sussex, both fine examples of Modernist architecture. In the 21st century, the rebuilt Hastings Pier won the 2017 RIBA Stirling Prize, with both the Weald and Downland Gridshell and Jubilee Library, Brighton being finalists in earlier years. Described as the tallest structure in Sussex, the 162-metre (531 ft) tall British Airways i360 in Brighton contains Britain's tallest moving observation tower with a platform that reaches 138 m (453 ft).

== Cinema ==
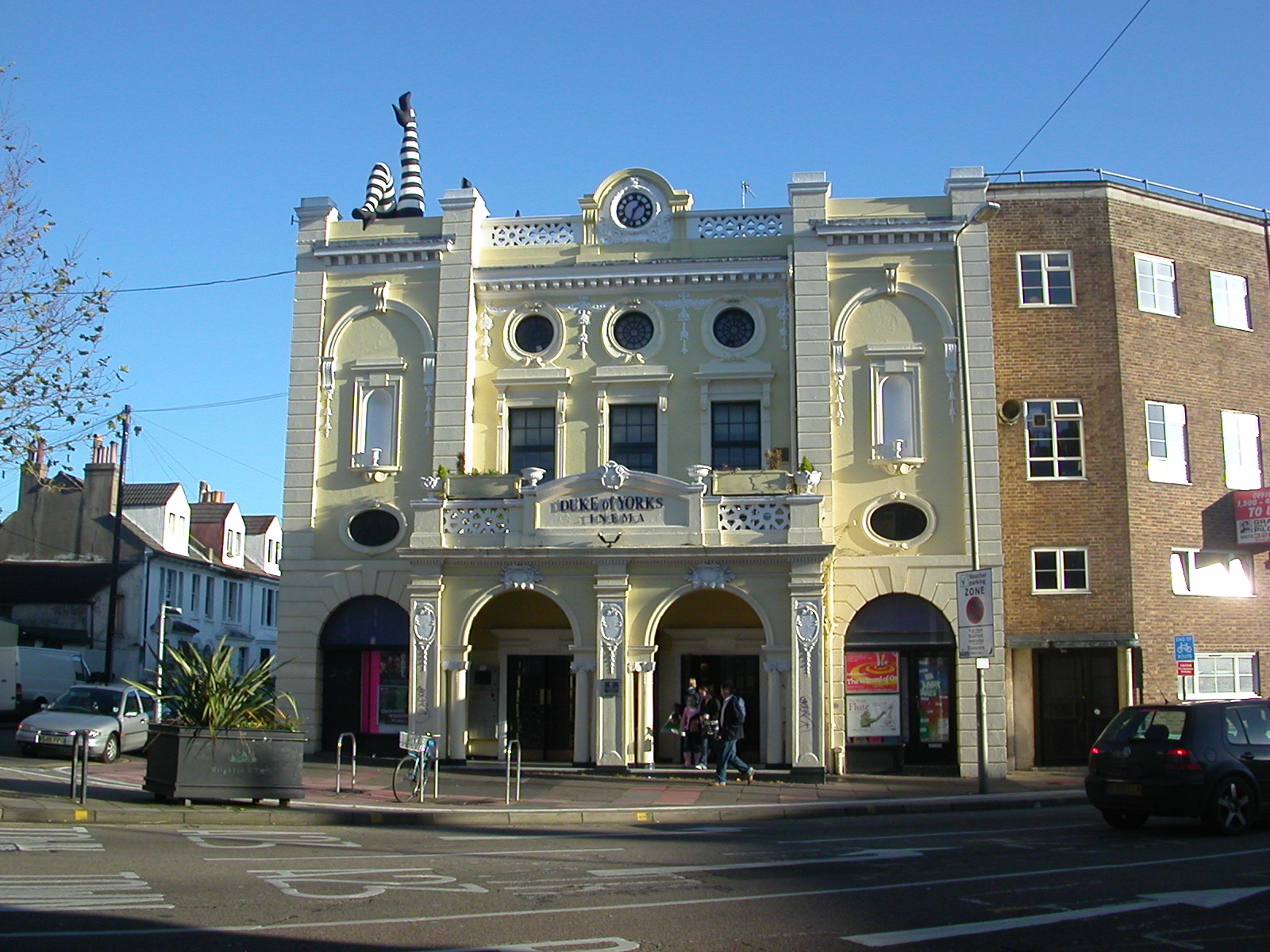
Duke of York's Picture House, Brighton (first opened 1910)

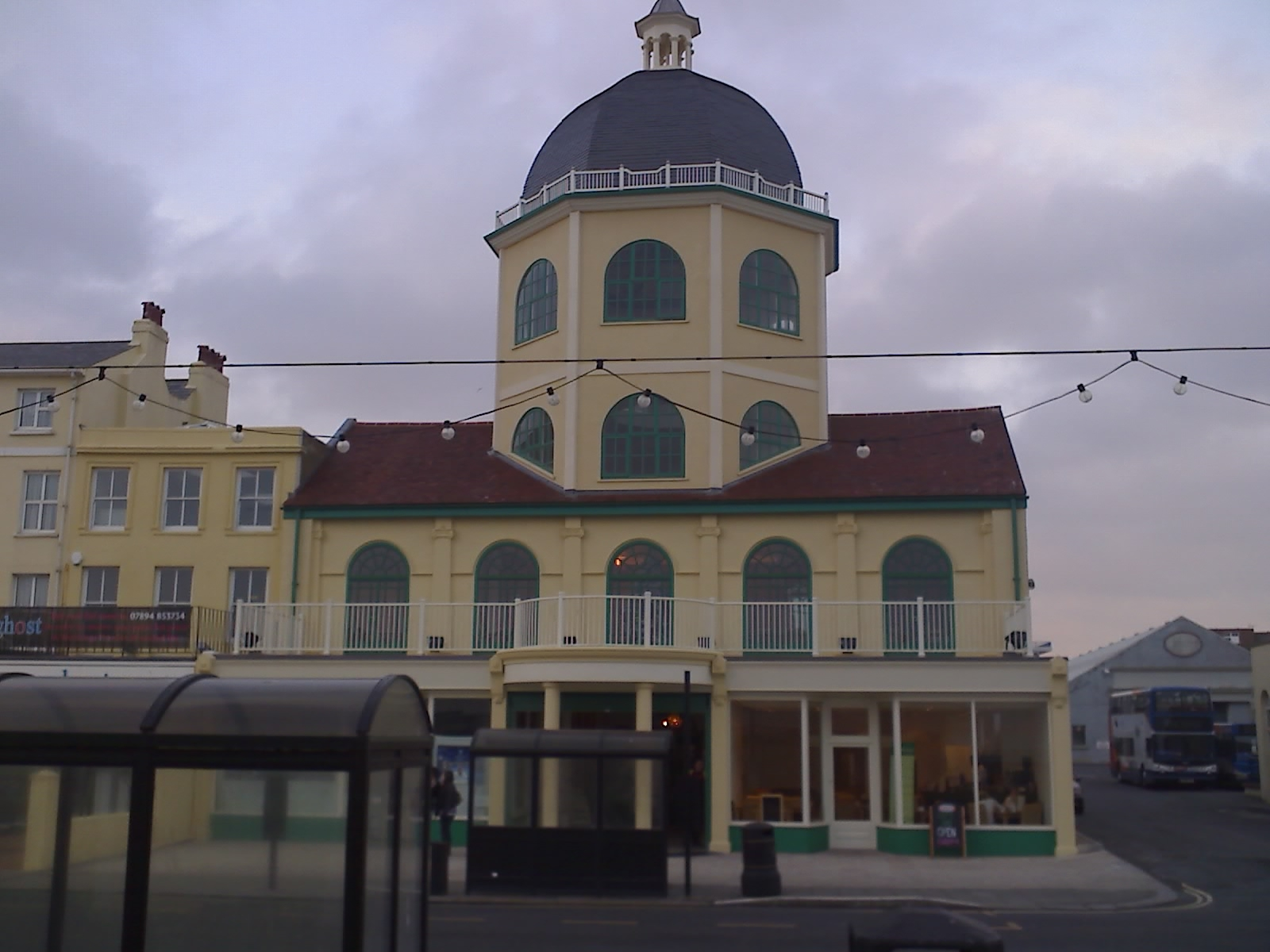
Dome Cinema, Worthing (first opened 1911)

The first film show in Sussex was in March 1896 in Brighton, the first in the UK outside of London. This was closely followed by a screening in Worthing in August 1896. From 1896 to 1910 several important early filmmakers were active in Brighton and Hove. Known as the Brighton School, the group included George Albert Smith, James Williamson and Esmé Collings. Hove resident Elizabeth Hawkins-Whitshed, who produced films about the Cresta Run in Switzerland and whose films were shown at Hove Town Hall in 1900 has been called the first identifiable woman filmmaker. Filmed in Brighton in 1908, GA Smith's A Visit to the Seaside was the first colour film for public screening anywhere in the world. From 1914 to 1922 Shoreham Beach was a major centre for the UK film industry. In his first three years there, Sidney Morgan directed 17 films, many of which starred his daughter Joan Morgan. His films included a 1921 silent film adaptation of The Mayor of Casterbridge, in collaboration with the novel's author Thomas Hardy.

Several critically acclaimed films have been set in Sussex including The Invisible Man (1933), National Velvet (1944), Brighton Rock (1947, 2010), Genevieve (1953), The Chalk Garden (1964), Oh! What a Lovely War (1969), Quadrophenia (1979), The Snowman (1982), When the Wind Blows (1986), Wish You Were Here (1987), Children of Men (2006), My Boy Jack (2007), Down Terrace (2009), Mr. Turner (2014), Mr Holmes (2015), My Policeman (2022), Lee (2023), Wicked Little Letters (2023) and Vindication Swim (2024). Documentary films made in Sussex include László Moholy-Nagy's Lobsters (1936), The Moon and the Sledgehammer (1971), The Moo Man (2012), Nick Cave's One More Time With Feeling (2016), The Ballad of Shirley Collins (2017), a documentary about Sussex folk singer Shirley Collins, and Another Paradise (2019).

Film directors from Sussex include Adrian Brunel and Graham Cutts, both eminent directors in the 1920s, Charles Frend, whose films were often large-scale and dramatic in nature, Manning Haynes, Don Chaffey, Jack Clayton, Pete Walker, Sean Ellis and Elliott Hasler. Several screenwriters of note are from Sussex. Charles Bennett is possibly best known for The 39 Steps (1935); Harold Pinter wrote the screenplay for The Pumpkin Eater (1963) from his Worthing home, for which he won a BAFTA. Screenwriter William Nicholson won an Oscar, for the epic Gladiator (2000) and was nominated for a BAFTA and an Oscar for Shadowlands (1993). David Hare was nominated for a BAFTA for writing the screenplay for The Reader (2008). Celebrated Sussex film actors include Katie Johnson, Anna Massey, Ralph Richardson and Lesley Manville. Laurence Olivier and Vivien Leigh also spent much of their lives in Sussex.

Two of the UK's oldest cinemas are in Sussex: the Duke of York's Picture House in Brighton, which opened in 1910, and Worthing's Dome Cinema which opened in 1911.

== Cuisine ==
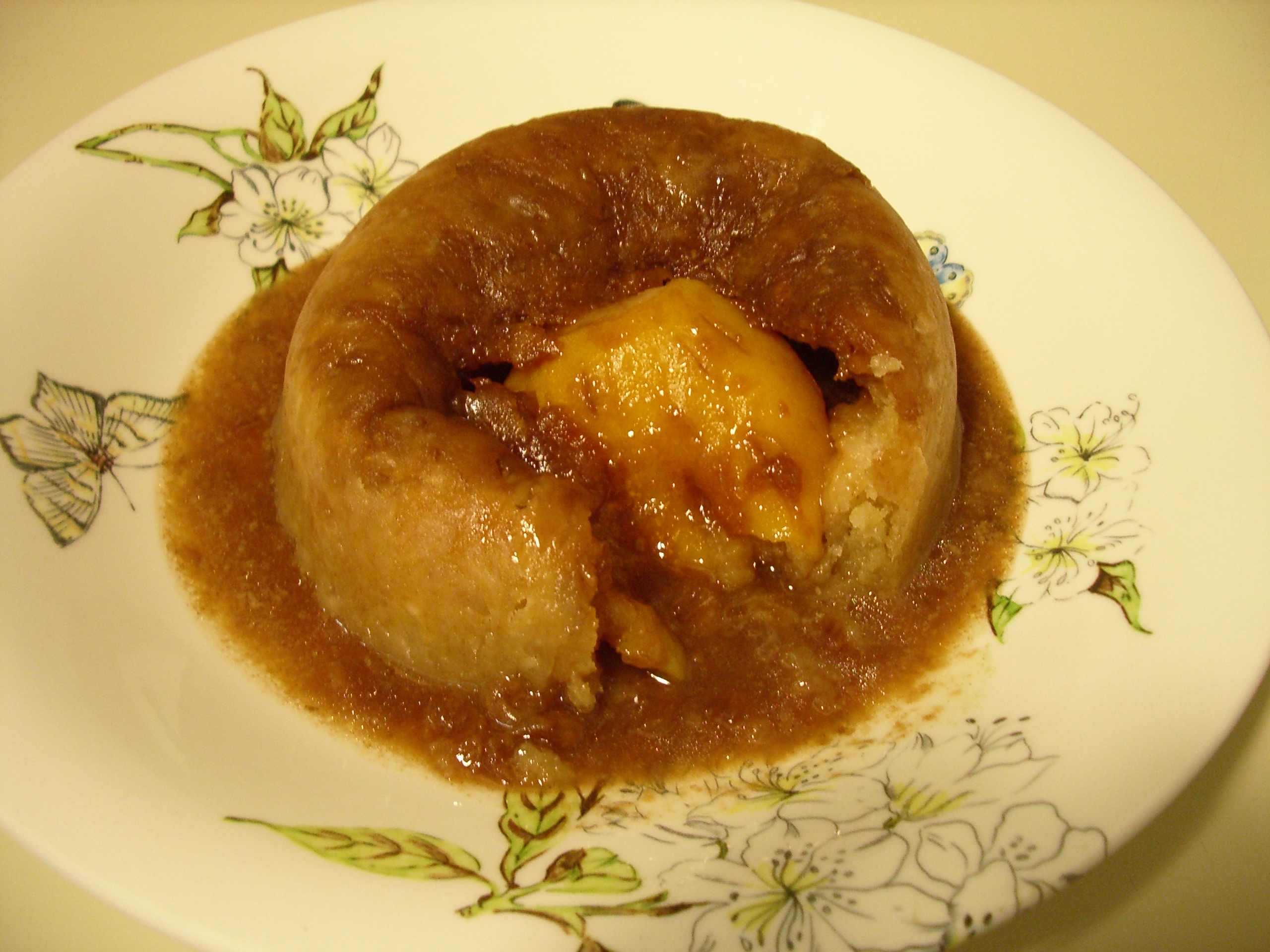
Sliced Sussex Pond Pudding

The historic county is known for its "seven good things of Sussex". These seven things are: Pulborough eel, Selsey cockle, Chichester lobster, Rye herring, Arundel mullet, Amberley trout and Bourne wheatear. Sussex is also known for: Ashdown Partridge Pudding, Chiddingly Hot pot, Sussex Bacon Pudding, Sussex Hogs' Pudding, Huffed Chicken, Sussex Churdles, Sussex Shepherds Pie, Sussex Pond Pudding, Sussex Blanket Pudding, Sussex Well Pudding, and Chichester Pudding. Sussex is particularly known for puddings: such was the reputation of Sussex that it was said that "to venture into the county was to risk being turned into a pudding yourself". In one version of the Sussex folk tale, the knucker dragon at Lyminster was slayed after being fed a poisoned Sussex pudding.

Sussex is also known for its cakes and biscuits known as Sussex plum heavies and Sussex Lardy Johns. Speciality breads include Lady Arundel's manchet, the recipe for which was first published in the 17th century whilst the town of Horsham has a continuing history of baking gingerbread. Banoffee pie was first created in 1972 in Jevington. The county has vineyards and has produced beer for centuries. It includes the 18th century beer brewers, Harveys of Lewes as well as many more recently established breweries. In recent decades Sussex wines have gained international acclaim winning awards including the 2006 Best Sparkling Wine in the World at the Decanter World Wine Awards. With 23 vineyards in 2015, Sussex has the largest and most densely planted cluster of vineyards in the UK. Many vineyards make wines using traditional Champagne varieties and methods, and there are similarities between the topography and chalk and clay soils of Sussex downland and that of the Champagne region which lies on a latitude 100 miles (161 km) to the south. With the backing of the UK Government, a consortium of Sussex vineyards announced in 2015 its intention to apply to the European Union for protected designation of origin status of Sussex wine.

At least 30 varieties of apple originate in Sussex including Egremont Russet, Knobbed Russet, Sussex Mother and Crawley Reinette. The Granny Smith apple was first cultivated by and named after Maria Ann Smith, a native Sussexian. The Sussex variety with the longest history in cultivation is the Golden Pippin, which has been grown since at least as early as 1629.

== Cultural identity ==
In the late 19th and early 20th centuries there existed a high level of patriotism towards Sussex. It was in this period that Sussex's anthem "Sussex by the Sea" was written, and literature celebrating the county produced by writers including Rudyard Kipling and Hilaire Belloc. Sussex has a centuries-old reputation for being separate and culturally distinct from the rest of England; This sense of separateness inspired intense patriotic sentiment and strongly infused Sussex literature from the 1890s.

As a former kingdom, Sussex had a strong identity from this period, which was enhanced by its framework of a long coastline, the South Downs and the wooded Weald to its north. Until at least the 18th century, the poor roads of the Weald tended to isolate Sussex, making the county largely self-supporting. Even into Victorian period, devotees of the county liked to think they were living in a land older than England. Culturally, Sussex historically looked in a southerly direction to the sea, rather than northwards to London. This can be deduced from a variety of sources, but perhaps the most striking are the earlier estate maps from the 17th and 18th centuries. Almost all of them place south at the top of the map, opposite to the standard convention of north-up. The presence of the sea and a long coastline has affected Sussex's relationship with London, making London of considerably less significance to Sussex than it is to Kent or Surrey.

Belloc called Sussex "the resistant county". Writing in 1929, Belloc stated that "One may talk a little fantastically but without too much exaggeration of "the Kingdom of Sussex". Writing in 1960s, Ian Nairn stated that despite its relative proximity to London to its north, Sussex looks south - the south of the county to the sea and the north to the line of the Downs which indicates the sea lying beyond. As the 20th century progressed, the character of Sussex and its dialect and customs eroded, but its people enjoyed a wealthier standard of living. Poverty and isolation had been key to the strength of a distinct Sussex identity; once they were removed, that identity weakened. Sussex's reputation for distinctiveness is repeated in literature. In Stella Gibbons's novel Cold Comfort Farm, Flora Poste, the central character muses that "Sussex, when all said and done, is not quite like other counties".

Some have suggested that the distinct cultural Sussex identity is fast diminishing, as parts of the county under urban sprawl. Peter Brandon suggested in 2010 that Sussex may cease to exist as a separate cultural entity in the next 50–60 years. Historian Chris Hare advocates a devolved regional assembly for Sussex and Brighton Kemptown MP, Lloyd Russell-Moyle has called for a Sussex Parliament, with tax-raising powers similar to the Welsh Senedd and for regional representation for Sussex in a reformed House of Lords. Peter Brandon advocates the reunification of East and West Sussex.

== Dialect ==
Historically, Sussex has had its own dialect with regional differences reflecting its cultural history. It has been divided into variants for the three western rapes of West Sussex, the two eastern rapes of Lewes and Pevensey and an area approximate to the easternmost rape of Hastings. The Sussex dialect is also notable in having an unusually large number of words for mud, in a way similar to the popular belief which exists that the Inuit have an unusually large number of words for snow.

== Folklore ==
Various mythical creatures and beings have been associated with Sussex, often inspired by landscape features such as hills, barrows and woodland. These include dragons and giants, fairies and the Devil. Knuckers were a sort of water dragon that lived in knuckerholes, or bottomless pools of water. St Leonards Forest was also home to a dragon first recorded in 770AD. According to legend, St Leonard was injured in the forest and Lilies of the Valley grow where his blood fell in an area of the forest is still called The Lily Beds. St Leonard requested that snakes be banished from the forest and the nightingales which interrupted his prayers should be silenced.

The legendary Bevis of Hampton is in Sussex folklore a giant often associated with Arundel, where he was supposed to live and would sometimes stride across the sea to the Isle of Wight. Further east, the Long Man of Wilmington was, according to some stories, either a memorial to a giant or the actual outline of a giant's body that had been killed by the Firle Giant. Another giant was Gill, after whom Gill's Grave on Mount Caburn was named. There is also a Gill's Ridge near Crowborough and Gill's Lap in Ashdown Forest.

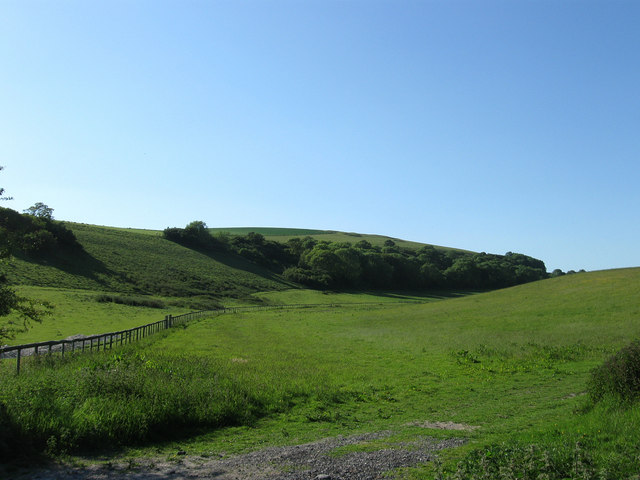
Harrow Hill on the South Downs was reputed to be the last home of fairies in England

A belief in fairies was formerly widespread. Sussex was the focus of a romantic revival of interest in fairies, begun in Yorkshire with the Cottingley Fairies, and continued in Sussex for the benefit of the middle classes and wistful artists, who had little to do with the farm labourers who were the source of much of the original lore. Known as 'pharisees' in Sussex dialect, Sussex fairies liked to dance. In The Four Men: A Farrago (1912), Hilaire Belloc recounts the story that at Halloween the fairies come out into the woods to dance in 'fairy rings'. Rudyard Kipling also wrote two Sussex stories involving fairies, Puck of Pook's Hill (1906) and Rewards and Fairies (1910) setting them in the Sussex Weald. Harrow Hill near Worthing is the site of a small hillfort and some Neolithic flint mines. According to an old woman who lived on Lee Farm, the hill was the last home of the fairies in England. They finally left when the archaeologists came to dig on the hill.

In Sussex folklore, the Devil is often portrayed as a folk villain and a figure of fun, outwitted either by the local populace or in some stories by St Dunstan or St Cuthman. Various landscape features in Sussex are named after the Devil, including Devil's Dyke, Devil's Bog in Ashdown Forest, Devil's Book, near Mount Caburn, the Devil's Ditch, near Goodwood, the Devil's Humps, the Devil's Jumps and the Devil's Road, a section of the Roman road, Stane Street.

== Humour ==
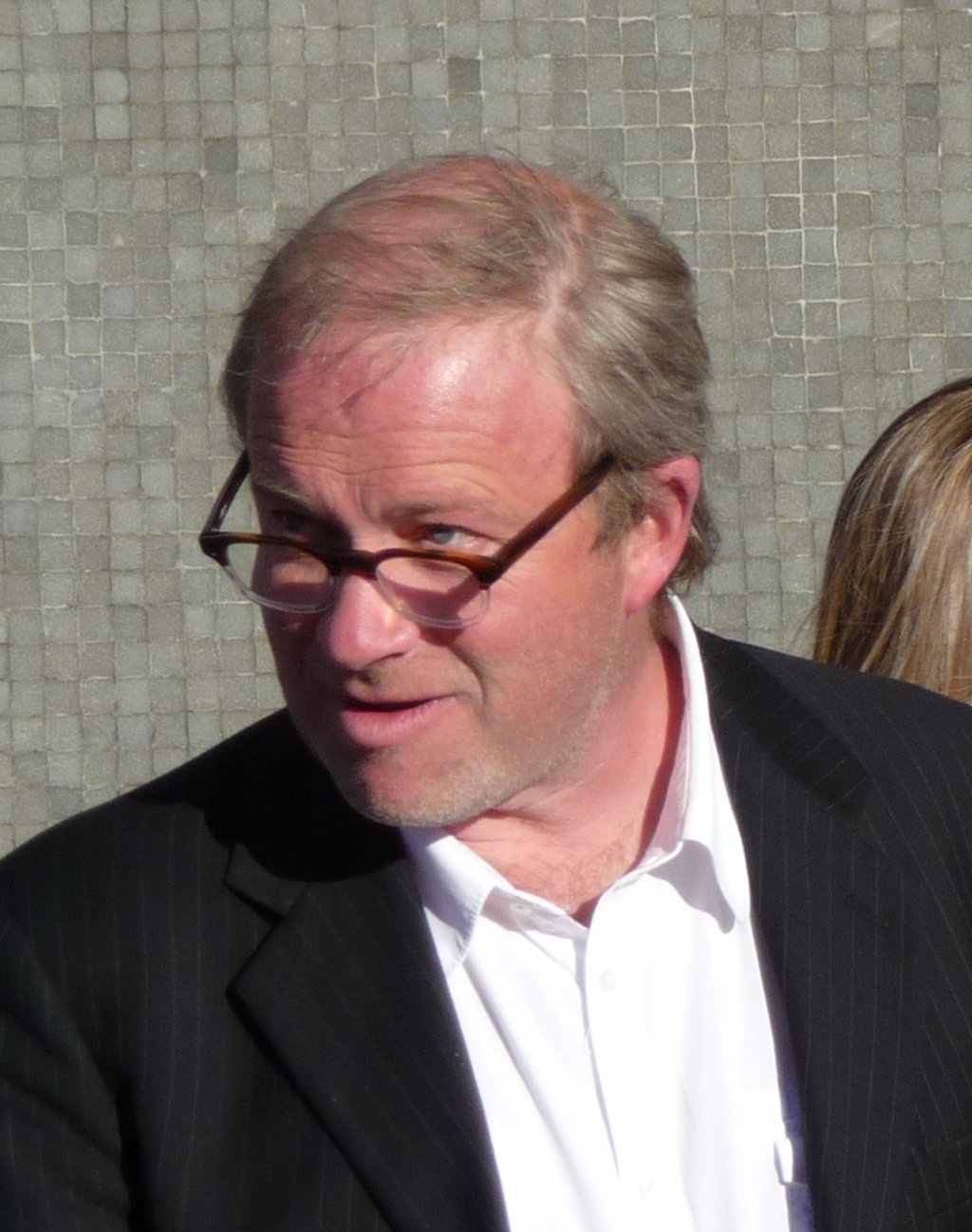
BAFTA Award-winning comedian, Harry Enfield

In the early 20th century and earlier, the traditional Sussex sense of humour was characterised by understatement, deadpan delivery and black comedy. The historian Desmond Seward has described the Sussex sense of humour as "dry, ironical and occasionally savage". Several traditional Sussex folk songs also capture the 'Silly Sussex' humour of the county.

Two Sussex variety and music hall comedians achieved significant success in the early 20th century - Max Miller, who was probably the greatest stand-up comedian of his generation, and Chesney Allen, who was best known for his double act, Flanagan and Allen, that he formed with Londoner, Bud Flanagan. Madeline Smith and Kirsten Cooke were comic actresses in the late 20th century, with Cooke best known for her role in the popular 1980s sitcom 'Allo 'Allo! Best known as the creator of sitcom Men Behaving Badly, Simon Nye also attended the same school as BAFTA award-winning comedian Harry Enfield, who created various characters including Kevin the Teenager, Smashie and Nicey and The Scousers in his sketch show Harry Enfield's Television Programme. Robin Driscoll is best known as a writer of Mr. Bean. Driscoll also worked on the sitcom They Came From Somewhere Else with Pete McCarthy, who was born and grew up outside Sussex but spent most of his career living in the county. Other Sussex comedians include: the writer Tony Hawks, scriptwriter James Bachman and stand-up comedians Paul Putner, Stephen Grant, Romesh Ranganathan, Jane Postlethwaite, Simon Evans and Zoe Lyons.

== Literature ==
Writing in the early 16th century, Andrew Boorde was author of the first English guidebook to Europe. Co-written by Thomas Sackville, 1st Earl of Dorset, the play Gorboduc from 1561 is one of the earliest documented works of literature from a Sussex writer. One of the earliest works about Sussex was Michael Drayton's epic topographical poem The Poly-Olbion . First published in 1612, the 17th song describes Sussex's four large Wealden forests of St Leonards, Worth, Ashdown and Waterdown Forests as if they were four wood nymphs driven away from their woodland abodes by the cutting down of woods to supply the county's iron forges. The Downs, which have already lost much of their foliage, laugh at the grief of the wood nymphs. Sussex's rivers, which spring from the forests are represented as water nymphs, which sympathise with the wood nymphs' plight.

Some writers born in Sussex include the Renaissance poet Thomas May (1594/5-1650), born in Mayfield, and playwrights Thomas Otway, born Trotton, near Midhurst, and John Fletcher (1579–1625), who was born in Rye. One of the most prolific playwrights of his day, Fletcher is thought to have collaborated with Shakespeare. In the 18th century poet William Collins (1721–59), was born in Chichester and in the Romantic period poet Percy Bysshe Shelley (1792–1822), was born at Field Place, Broadbridge Heath, near Horsham. Victorian poet Wilfrid Scawen Blunt (1840–1922), was born at Petworth House, Petworth.

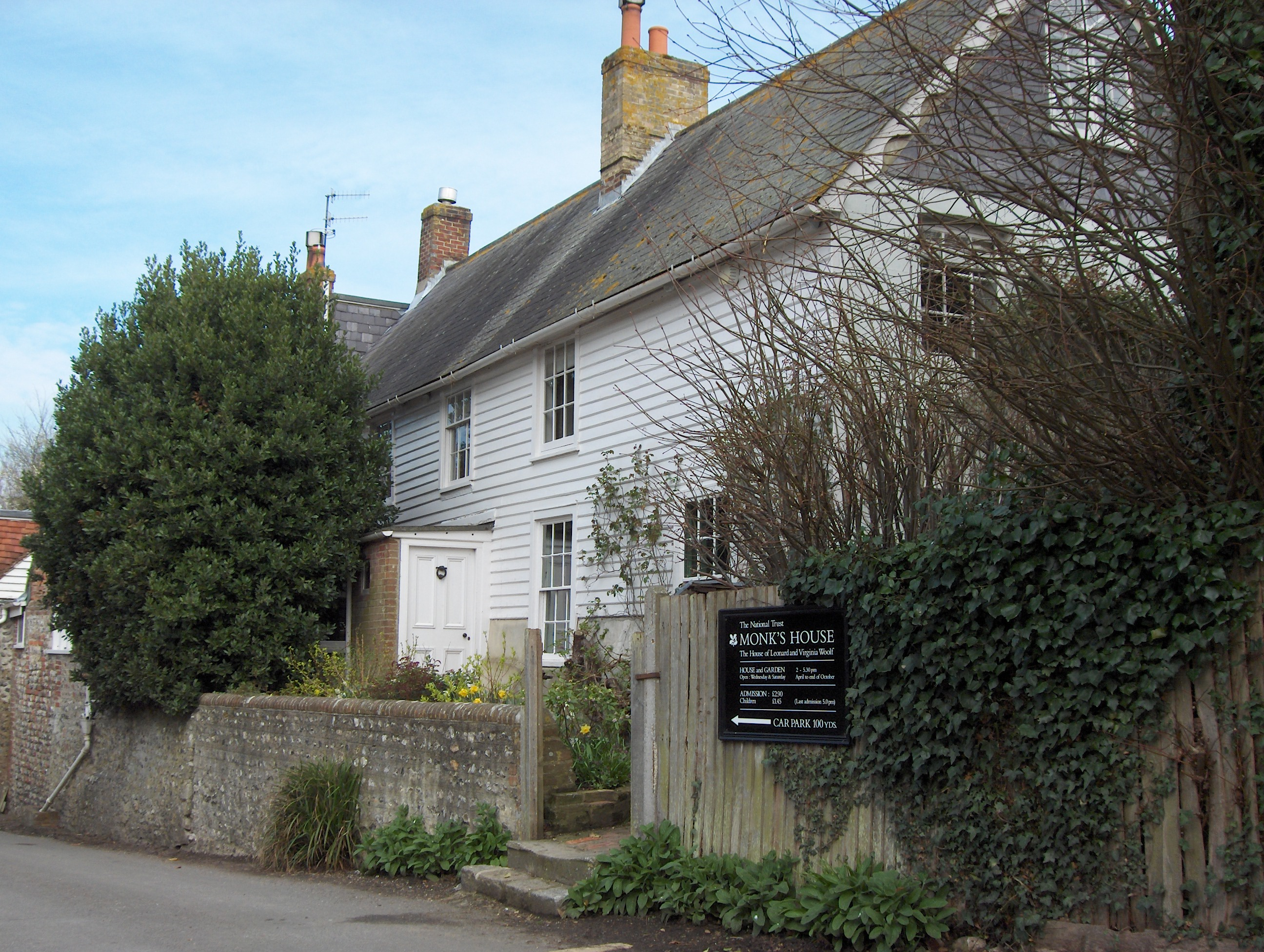
Monk's House in Rodmell was a centre for the Bloomsbury Group

The poet, writer and Member of Parliament Hilaire Belloc (1870–1953) spent most of his life in Sussex, growing up in Slindon and returning to the county to live at Shipley. Belloc's works include The Four Men: a Farrago in which four characters journey on foot across the Sussex from Robertsbridge to Harting. Belloc is remembered in an annual celebration in Sussex known as Belloc Night that takes place on the writer's birthday, 27 July, in the manner of Burns Night in Scotland. The celebration includes reading from Belloc's work and partaking of a bread and cheese supper with pickles.

The twentieth-century novelist Sheila Kaye-Smith (1887–1956) was born in St Leonards-on-Sea, near Hastings, and lived most of her life in Sussex. She is known for her many novels in the British regional literature genre, which are set in the borderlands of Sussex and Kent. Poet, playwright and novelist Maureen Duffy (1933- ) comes from Worthing, while the novelist Hammond Innes (1913–98) was born in Horsham.

In addition there are writers, who while they were not born in Sussex had a strong connection. This includes William Blake (1757–1827), who moved to Felpham in 1800 on the advice of Sussex poet William Hayley (1745-1820). Tried and cleared of the crime of sedition at the county court of Quarter Sessions in 1804, Blake returned to London later that year. One of Victorian England's most famous poets Alfred Tennyson (1809–92) spent his summers, away from the holiday crowds of the Isle of Wight, at Aldworth House, Blackdown, which he built in 1869. H.G. Wells was brought up at Uppark, South Harting, near Petersfield, where his mother was housekeeper. He also went to school and taught in Midhurst. Rudyard Kipling (1865–1936) also spent much of his life in Sussex, living in Rottingdean and later Burwash. While the novelist John Cowper Powys is particularly associated with Dorset and Wales, he lived in Sussex from the mid-1890s until 1910. Another modernist Virginia Woolf (1882–1941) and her husband Leonard, had a country retreat at Monk's House in Rodmell near in Lewes from 1919. They received there many important visitors connected to the Bloomsbury Group, including T. S. Eliot, E. M. Forster, Roger Fry and Lytton Strachey. Scottish writer Arthur Conan Doyle (1859–1930) spent the last thirty years of his life in Crowborough. In 1897 Henry James (1843–1916) leased Lamb House in Rye, and purchasing it two years later, spent most of his last 18 years there, where he wrote several major works. Lamb House was subsequently home to both E. F. Benson and Rumer Godden.

A. A. Milne lived in Ashdown Forest for much of his life and set his Winnie-the-Pooh stories in the forest.

== Music ==
Sussex's rich musical heritage encompasses folk, classical and popular genres amongst others. Passed on through oral tradition, many of Sussex's traditional songs may not have changed significantly for centuries, with their origins perhaps dating as far back as the time of the South Saxons. William Henry Hudson compared the singing of the Sussexians with that of the Basques and the Tehuelche people of Patagonia, both peoples with ancient cultures. The songs sung by the Copper Family, Henry Burstow, Samuel Willett, Peter and Harriett Verrall, David Penfold and others were collected by John Broadwood and his niece Lucy Broadwood, Kate Lee and composers Ralph Vaughan Williams and George Butterworth. Sometimes song lyrics were recorded with some censorship, such as the Sussex Whistling Song and the Horn Fair song. Sussex also played a major part in the folk music revival of the 1960s and 1970s with various musicians including George 'Pop' Maynard, Scan Tester, Tony Wales and the sisters Dolly and Shirley Collins.

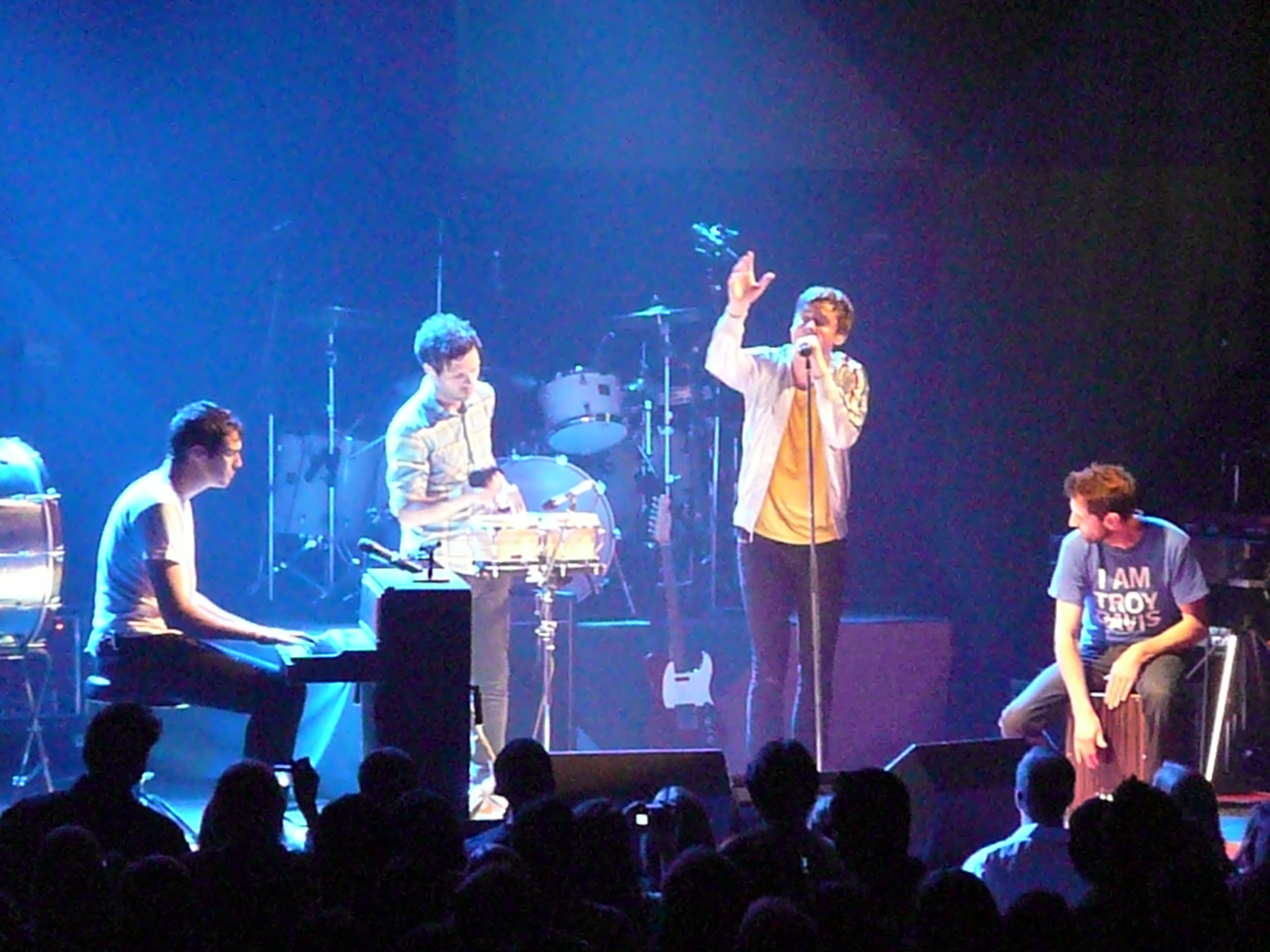
Keane performing live in Washington DC

Sussex has also been home to many composers of classical music including Thomas Weelkes, John Ireland, Edward Elgar, Frank Bridge, Arnold Bax, Sir Hubert Parry and Ralph Vaughan Williams, who played a major part in recording Sussex's traditional music. More recently, John Tavener, Michael Finnissy, Jonathan Harvey and Martin Butler have made their homes in the county. Claude Debussy wrote much of La mer whilst in Eastbourne. Composed by William Ward-Higgs, Sussex by the Sea is the county's unofficial anthem. In popular music, Sussex has produced artists including Leo Sayer, The Cure, The Levellers, Brett Anderson, Keane, The Kooks, STOMP, The Feeling, Rizzle Kicks, Conor Maynard, Tom Odell, Passenger, Royal Blood, Rag'n'Bone Man, Celeste and Architects. Other artists include Ed Harcourt, The Go! Team, British Sea Power and Antony Hegarty. In the 1970s, Sussex was home to Phun City, the UK's first large-scale free music festival and hosted the 1974 Eurovision Song Contest which propelled ABBA to worldwide fame. While Glyndebourne is one of the world's best known opera houses, the county is home to professional orchestras the Brighton Philharmonic Orchestra and the Worthing Symphony Orchestra.

== Religion ==
Sussex is connected with several saints, including St Wilfrid, sometimes known as the 'Apostle of Sussex'; St Cuthman of Steyning; St Cuthflæd of Lyminster; St Lewina; St Richard of Chichester, Sussex's patron saint; St Philip Howard, Earl of Arundel; and James Hannington. In folklore, Mayfield and Devil's Dyke are linked with St Dunstan while West Tarring has links with St Thomas a Becket. The historic county has been a single diocese after St Wilfrid converted the kingdom of Sussex in the seventh century. The seat of the Sussex bishopric was originally located at Selsey Abbey before the Normans moved it to Chichester Cathedral in 1075. Since 1965 Arundel Cathedral has been the seat of the Roman Catholic Bishops of Arundel and Brighton, which covers Sussex and Surrey.

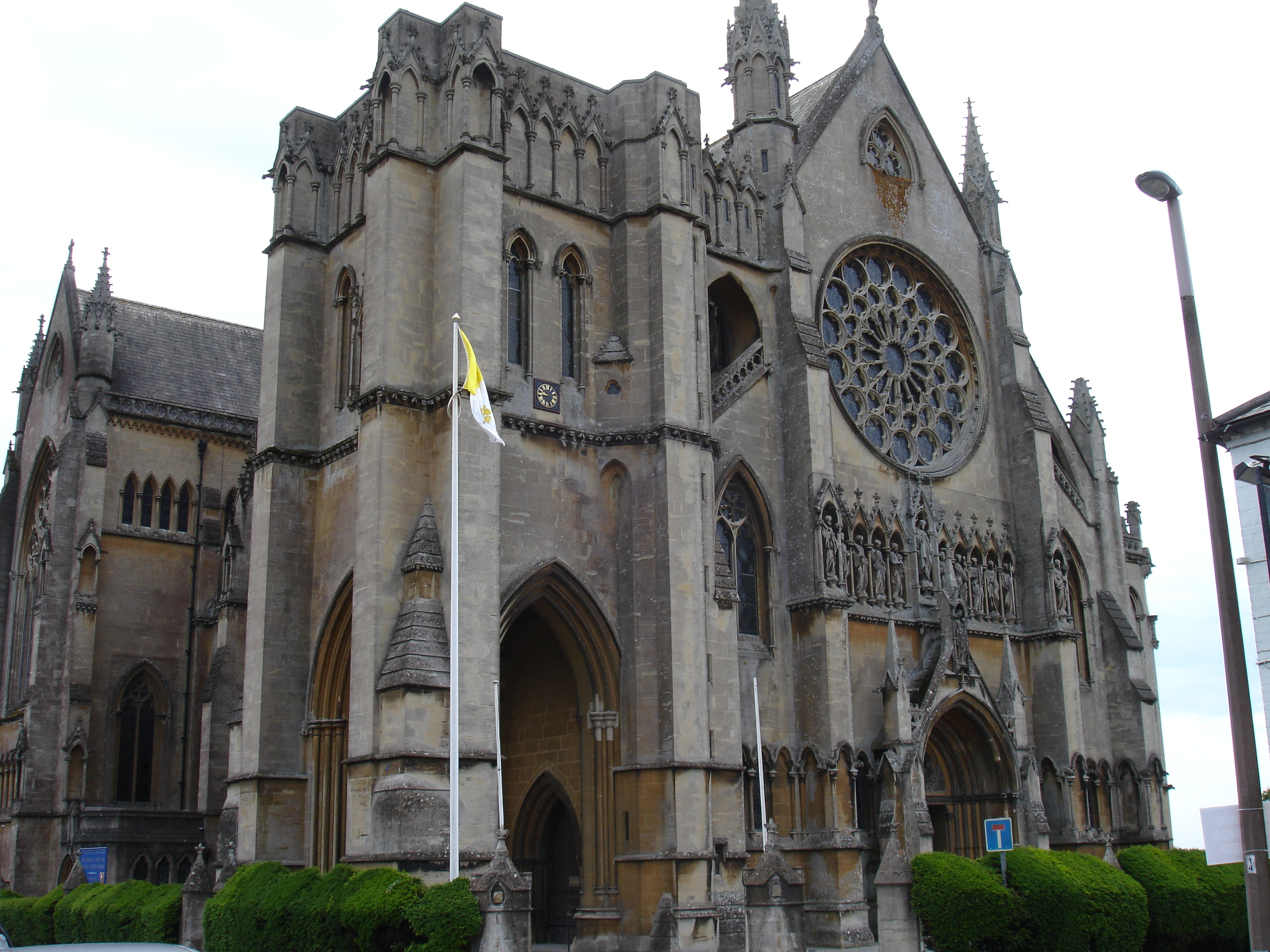
The Roman Catholic cathedral at Arundel. Arundel has been a stronghold of the Catholic faith since the Reformation

.

Historically, the west of the county has had a tendency towards Catholicism while the east of the county has had a tendency towards non-conformism. The county has been home to several pilgrimage sites, including the shrine (at Chichester Cathedral) to St Richard of Chichester which was destroyed during the Reformation, and the more recent Catholic shrine at West Grinstead. During the Marian persecutions, several Sussex men were martyred for their Protestant faith, including 17 men at Lewes. The Society of Dependants (nicknamed the Cokelers) were a non-conformist sect formed in Loxwood. The Quaker and founding father of Pennsylvania, William Penn worshipped near Thakeham; his UK home from 1677 to 1702 was at nearby Warminghurst. The UK's only Carthusian monastery is situated at St. Hugh's Charterhouse, Parkminster near Cowfold. The UK headquarters of the Church of Scientology is situated at Saint Hill Manor, near East Grinstead.

== Science ==
In the 14th century, Thomas Bradwardine's work crossed the boundaries of science, philosophy and religion. Bradwardine later became Archbishop of Canterbury. Pell's equation and the Pell number are both named after 17th century mathematician John Pell. Pell is sometimes credited with inventing the division sign, which has also been attributed to Swiss mathematician Johann Heinrich Rahn, one of his students. In the 19th century, geologist and palaeontologist Gideon Mantell began the scientific study of dinosaurs. In 1822 he was responsible for the discovery and eventual identification of the first fossil teeth, and later much of the skeleton of Iguanodon. Braxton Hicks contractions are named after John Braxton Hicks, the Sussex doctor who in 1872 first described the uterine contractions not resulting in childbirth.

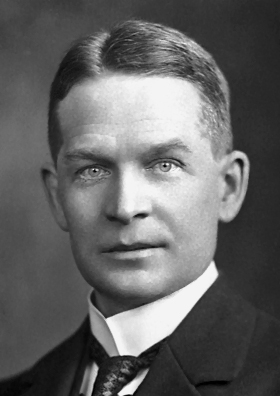
Frederick Soddy, winner of the 1921 Nobel Prize in Chemistry

In the 20th century, Frederick Soddy won the Nobel Prize in Chemistry for his work on radioactive substances, and his investigations into the origin and nature of isotopes. Frederick Gowland Hopkins shared the Nobel Prize in Physiology or Medicine in 1929 with Christiaan Eijkman, for discovering the growth-stimulating vitamins. Martin Ryle shared the Nobel Prize for Physics in 1974 with Cornishman Antony Hewish, the first Nobel prize awarded in recognition of astronomical research. While working at the University of Sussex, Harold Kroto won the 1996 Nobel Prize in Chemistry with Richard Smalley and Robert Curl from Rice University in the US for the discovery of fullerenes. David Mumford is a mathematician known for distinguished work in algebraic geometry and for research into vision and pattern theory, including the Mumford-Shah Functional. He won the International Mathematical Union's Fields Medal in 1974 and in 2010 was awarded the United States National Medal of Science.

In the social sciences, Sussex was home to economist John Maynard Keynes from 1925 to 1946. The founding father of Keynesian economics, he is widely considered to be one of the founders of modern macroeconomics and the most influential economist of the 20th century. David Pilbeam won the 1986 International Prize from the Fyssen Foundation.

In the early 20th century, Sussex was at the centre of one of what has been described as 'British archaeology's greatest hoax'. Bone fragments said to have been collected in 1912 were presented as the fossilised remains of a previously unknown early human, referred to as Piltdown Man. In 1953 the bone fragments were exposed as a forgery, consisting of the lower jawbone of an orangutan deliberately combined with the skull of a fully developed modern human. From 1967 to 1979, Sussex was home to the Isaac Newton Telescope at the Royal Greenwich Observatory in Herstmonceux Castle.

== Sport ==
Sussex has a centuries-long tradition of sport. Sussex has played a key role in the early development of both cricket and stoolball. Cricket is recognised as having been formed in the Weald and Sussex is where cricket was first recorded as being played by men (in 1611), and by women (in 1677), as well as being the location of the first reference to a cricket bat (in 1622) and a wicket (in 1680). Founded in 1839, Sussex CCC is England's oldest county cricket club and is the oldest professional sports club in the world. Slindon Cricket Club dominated the sport for a while in the 18th century. The cricket ground at Arundel Castle traditionally plays host to a Duke of Norfolk's XI which plays the national test sides touring England. Founded in 1971, the Sussex Cricket League is believed to be the largest adult cricket league in the world, with 335 teams in 2018.

The sport of stoolball is also associated with Sussex, which has a claim to be where the sport originated and certainly where its revival took place in the early 20th century. Sussex is represented in the Football League by Brighton & Hove Albion and Crawley Town. Brighton has been a League member since 1920, whereas Crawley was promoted to the League in 2011. Sussex has had its own football association, since 1882 and its own football league, which has since expanded into Surrey, since 1920. In horse racing, Sussex is home to Goodwood, Fontwell Park, Brighton and Plumpton. The All England Jumping Course show jumping facility at Hickstead is situated 8 miles (13 km) north of Brighton and Hove.

== Visual arts ==
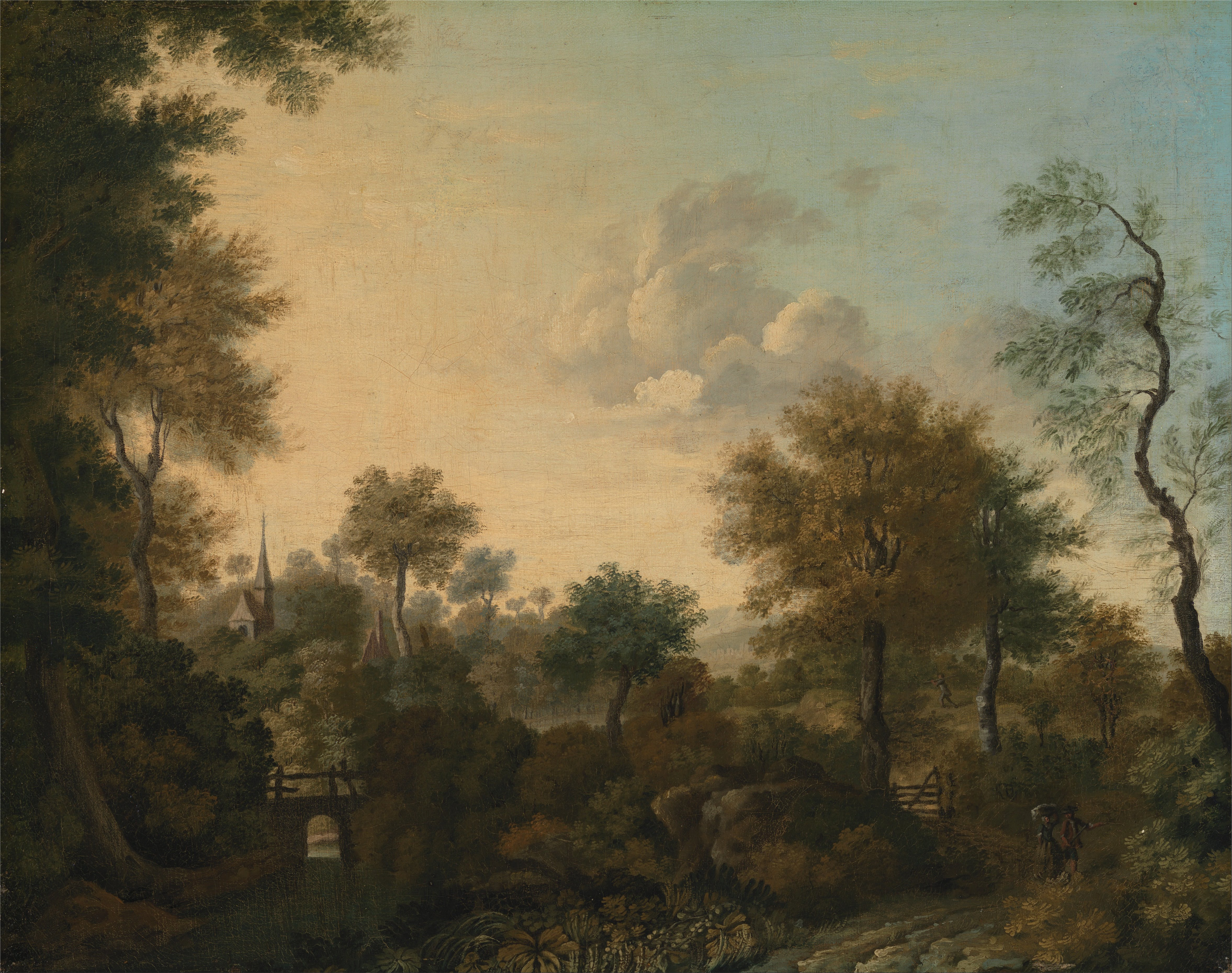
Painting by George Smith of a scene near Arundel (mid 18th century), Yale Center for British Art, New Haven, Connecticut, USA

Some of the earliest known art in Sussex is the carvings in the galleries of the Neolithic flint mines at Cissbury on the South Downs near Worthing. These appear to include the heads of two red deer, an ox and a fish and are significant as few pieces of representational art survive from the British Neolithic period. From the Roman period, the palace at Fishbourne has the largest in situ collection of mosaics in the UK, while the villa at Bignor contains some of the best preserved Roman mosaics in England.

Dating from around the 12th century, the 'Lewes Group' of wall paintings can be found in several churches across the centre of Sussex, including at Clayton, Coombes, Hardham, Plumpton and now-lost paintings at Westmeston. Some of the paintings are celebrated for their age, extent and quality: Ian Nairn calls those at Hardham "the fame of Hardham", and descriptions such as "fine", "Hardham's particular glory" and "one of the most important sets in the country" have been applied. Of uncertain origin, the Long Man of Wilmington is Europe's largest representation of the human form.

In the late 18th century several men commissioned important works of the county which ensured that its landscapes and daily life were captured onto canvas. William Burrell of Knepp Castle commissioned Swiss-born watercolourist Samuel Hieronymus Grimm to tour Sussex, producing 900 watercolours of the county's buildings. Charles Lennox, 3rd Duke of Richmond, whose seat was at Goodwood House, commissioned landscape artist George Smith of Chichester to produce various works. George Wyndham, 3rd Earl of Egremont of Petworth House was a patron of painters such as J. M. W. Turner and John Constable. John 'Mad Jack' Fuller also commissioned Turner to make a series of paintings which resulted in thirteen finished watercolours of Fuller's house at Brightling Park and the area around it.

In the 19th century landscape watercolourist Copley Fielding lived in Sussex and illustrator Aubrey Beardsley and painter and sculptor Eric Gill were born in Brighton. Gill later founded an art colony in Ditchling known as The Guild of St Joseph and St Dominic, which survived until 1989. The 1920s and 1930s saw the creation of some of the best-known works by Edward Burra who was known for his work of Sussex, Paris and Harlem and Eric Ravilious who is known for his paintings of the South Downs and Eric Slater with his colour woodcuts of the Sussex landscape. Also in the 1920s and 1930s, Surrealist painter Paul Nash lived at Iden and later in Rye and became friends with Burra.

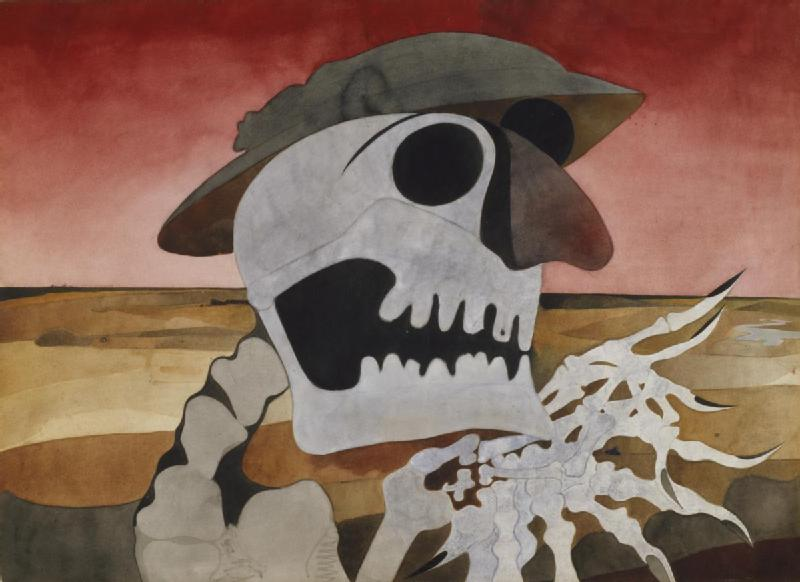
Edward Burra's anti-war Skull in a Landscape (1946), Imperial War Museum, London

In the early 20th century Vanessa Bell and Duncan Grant, both members of the Bloomsbury Group, lived and worked at Charleston Farmhouse near Firle. Sussex also became a major centre for surrealism in the early 20th century. At West Dean, Edward James was patron to artists including Salvador Dalí and René Magritte while at Farley Farm House near Chiddingly the home of Roland Penrose and Lee Miller was frequented by artists such as Pablo Picasso, Man Ray, Henry Moore, Eileen Agar, Jean Dubuffet, Dorothea Tanning and Max Ernst. Both collections form one of the most important bodies of Surrealist art in Europe.

=== Sculpture ===
The Cass Sculpture Foundation is based at Goodwood. Chichester Cathedral has the early Chichester reliefs which affected the likes of the young Eric Gill growing up nearby and Henry Moore. Chichester Cathedral is also home to several contemporary works by John Skelton who lived and worked at Streat near Ditchling. Skelton was nephew of Eric Gill whose Ditchling community saw a number of important artists pass through. Worthing Museum and Art Gallery has works in the collection by Philip Jackson, Dora Gordine and John Skelton. Henri Gaudier-Brzeska's letters to Sophie Brzeska documents their visit to Littlehampton in 1913 to recuperate, not having seen the sea for a year. Peter Randall-Page grew up in Crowborough spending his childhood exploring Ashdown Forest. Philip Jackson lives and works in West Sussex.

== See also ==
- Music of Sussex
- Culture of England
- Culture of Cornwall
- Culture of Yorkshire

== Bibliography ==
- McCann, Tim (2004). Sussex Cricket in the Eighteenth Century. Sussex Record Society.
- Tomlinson, Allan (2010). A Dictionary of Sports Studies. Oxford: Oxford University Press. ISBN 978-0199213818.
- Waghorn, H. T. (1906). The Dawn of Cricket. Electric Press. ISBN 978-0-94-782117-3.
