= Broadwood =

Broadwood may refer to:

A surname

- Henry Fowler Broadwood (1811–1893), English piano maker, son of James Broadwood
- Henry Broadwood, 1793 or 1795 to 1878, son of John, Conservative MP
- James Broadwood (1772–1851), English piano maker, son of John Broadwood
- John Broadwood (1732–1812), Scottish piano maker
- John Broadwood (song collector) (1798–1864), English folk song collector, son of James Broadwood
- Lucy Broadwood (1858–1929), English folk song collector, daughter of Henry Fowler Broadwood
- Robert Broadwood (1862–1917), British general, grandson of John Broadwood

A place name

- Broadwood (constituency), of Wan Chai District Council, Hong Kong
- Broadwood Stadium, a football stadium in Cumbernauld, Scotland and the home of Clyde F.C.
- Broadwood, New Zealand, a town
- Broadwood, Western Australia, a suburb of Kalgoorlie which includes a street of the same name

Other uses

- Broadwood and Sons, an English piano manufacturer, named after John Broadwood
