= Music of Sussex =

Historic and geographic music genre

The historic county of Sussex in Southern England has a rich musical heritage that encompasses the genres of folk, classical, rock, and popular music amongst others. With the unbroken survival of its indigenous music, Sussex was at the forefront of the English folk music revivals of the 19th and 20th centuries. Many classical composers have found inspiration in Sussex, and the county continues to have a thriving musical scene across the musical genres. In Sussex by the Sea, the county has its own unofficial anthem.

Perhaps the first known musical instrument from Sussex is the so-called 'Sussex horn', a variant of the Bronze Age Irish horn. Dating from around 900BC this instrument was found in the late 18th century at the bottom of a well in Battle.

== Folk music ==
=== Traditional music ===
Of all the counties in England, it is Sussex that appears to have drawn the greatest attention from folk song collectors over a period of some 130 years. This was due to a flourishing tradition of folk dance, mummers plays (known in Sussex as Tipteers' or Tipteerers' plays) and folk song, but also in part because of the rural nature of the county in the late 19th and early 20th centuries and yet its relatively close proximity to London.

Passed on through oral tradition, many of Sussex's traditional songs may not have changed significantly for centuries, with their origins perhaps dating as far back as the time of the South Saxons. Writing in 1752, John Burton commented on the "sharp pitch" and "goatish noise" of the Sussexians, which William Henry Hudson thought still held true when writing nearly 150 years later.

What strikes me as the most curious and interesting about their singing – their love of high-pitched voices, and, in many of their ballads their go-as-you-please tuneless tuneful manner, with the prolonging of some notes at random and "bleating out of goatish noises" – is its resemblance to the singing of the Basques, which is perhaps the most primitive kind of vocal music that survives in Europe. This Basque singing in its turn reminds me of all the Indians' singing I have heard in South America, including that of the Tehuelches, the Patagonian nomad race... The Basques and the red men, like our Sussexians, are fond of shrillness and acute sounds, but do not, like the East Indians, cultivate falsetto.

— W.H. Hudson, Nature in Downland (1900)

In the Sussex tradition there is a strong vein of lyrical songs reflecting the life of the countryside and romance. There are also ballads, drinking songs and songs that capture the 'Silly Sussex' humour of the county.

=== Folk song collecting ===
Perhaps the earliest of collections was made by the Revd. John Broadwood in 1843, published as Old English Songs - as now sung by the Peasantry of the Weald of Surrey and Sussex. His niece, Lucy Broadwood, published the anthologies Sussex Songs, English County Songs and English Traditional Songs and Carols. Probably because of the presence of the Broadwoods in the area, most of the traditional Sussex music collected in the early days of the folk revival came from around Horsham. Classical musicians who also explored the Sussex repertoire include Percy Grainger and Ralph Vaughan Williams. Grainger was rather cavalier in his appropriation of the folk melodies he recorded from all over the world, including arrangements of old Sussex tunes such as The Merry King and the Sussex Mummers' Christmas Carol. (Mummers in Sussex dialect are known as Tipteers or Tipteerers). Singer, Henry Burstow, was known to have over 400 songs in his repertoire. Ralph Vaughan Williams' use of the tune of Our Captain Calls All Hands as sung by Harriett Verrall of Monks Gate, near Horsham, as a setting for John Bunyan’s To be a Pilgrim and George Butterworth’s arrangement of Folk Songs from Sussex. The tune used by Harriett Verrall was also used by Vaughan Williams in what subsequently became known as the Sussex Carol. Using early sound-recording equipment, Vaughan Williams was able to make actual recordings of some songs, including a 1907 version of The Trees They Do Grow High as sung by David Penfold, the landlord of the Plough Inn at Rusper.

Kate Lee, one of the founders of the English Folk Dance and Song Society, found James 'Brasser' Copper and his brother Thomas, the landlord of the Black Horse public house in Rottingdean. In the 1950s Brasser's son Jim, grandson, Bob and others were featured by the BBC and broadcast The Life of James Copper, honouring him with a front cover photo on the Radio Times and asked to sing in London's Royal Albert Hall. Another founder of the English Folk Dance and Song Society, William Henry Gill also collected and arranged folk song material from Sussex.

Sometimes song lyrics were recorded with some censorship, such as the Sussex Whistling Song and the Horn Fair song. Sung to the tune of Lillibullero and edited for its coarseness, the Sussex Whistling Song describes the Devil's dislike of the wife of a Sussex farmer in which the refrain was whistled. As is usual in Sussex lore, the Devil is depicted in a foolish light, in this case 'the wife' gets the better of him. In 1861 Mark Antony Lower wrote that "The effect, when continued by strong whistles of a group of lusty countrymen, is very striking, and cannot be adequately conveyed by description."

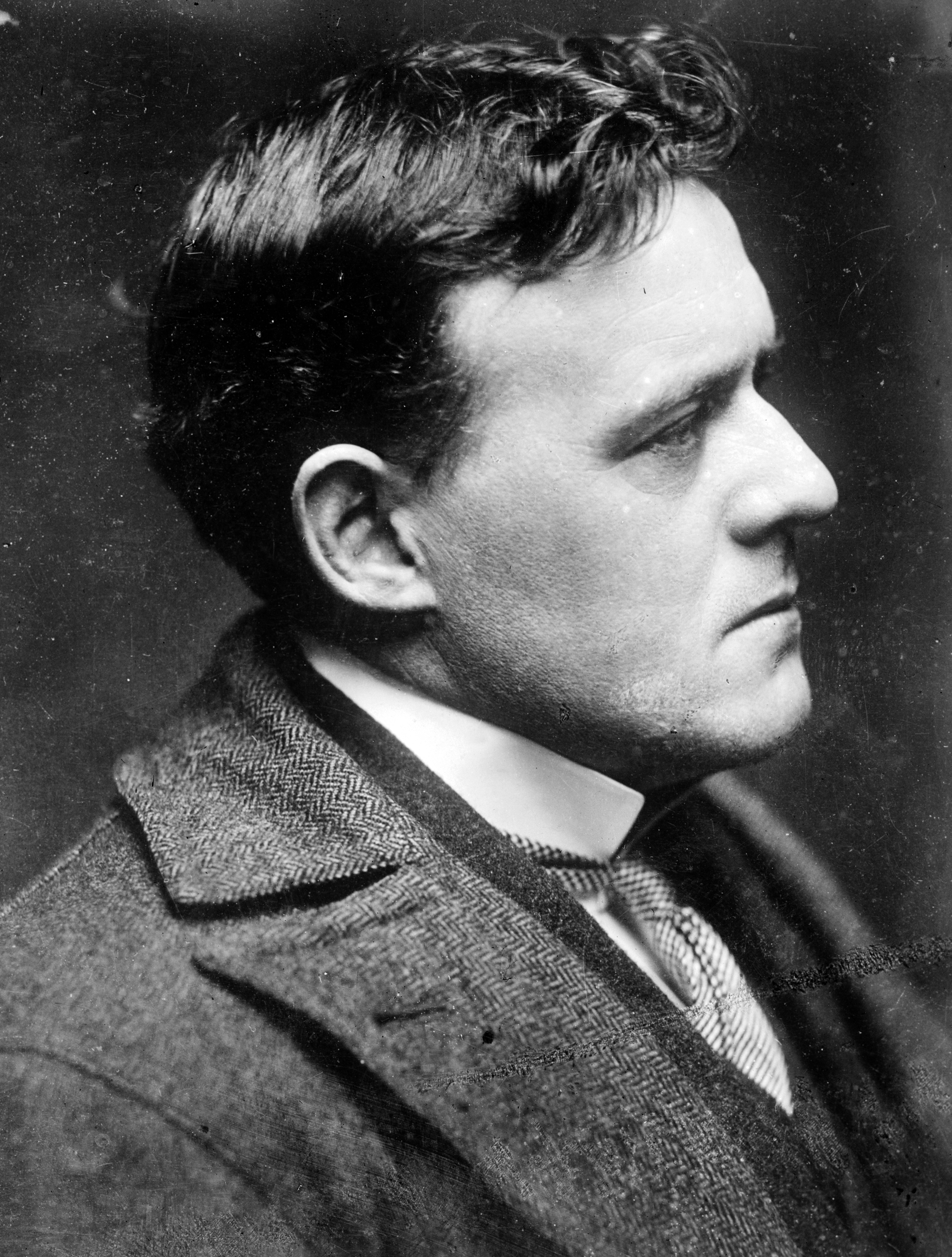
An enthusiastic singer of Sussex songs, Hilaire Belloc also wrote some of his own

The Horn Fair song was written about a fair known for its drinking and licentiousness. Sussex drinking songs include the Sussex Toast and Twankydillo. Writer Hilaire Belloc, who spent most of his life in the county, enjoyed traditional Sussex singing, writing two drinking songs, the Sussex Drinking Song, which was set to music by Martyn Wyndham-Read, and the West Sussex Drinking Song, which was included in Belloc's novel, The Four Men: a Farrago, and was put to music in 1921 by Ivor Gurney. Belloc wrote about singing as if it were the soul of Sussex and a key part of its identity. Belloc described the 'proper type of song' for Sussex as being the glee, comparing the glee's relationship to Sussex with that of the ritornello of Italy, the seguidilla of Spain, the pastourou of Provence and the saga of the North Sea. Glee harmonies have also been part of the repertoire of the Copper family for several hundred years. Belloc also calls a song named Golier the "national anthem" of Sussex.

Sung at the annual dinner of the now-defunct Men of Sussex Society, The Song o' the Sussex Men, written in Sussex dialect by Arthur Beckett, contains verses about various characters associated with Sussex including St Wilfrid, St Cuthman, St Dunstan, John Dudeney, Tom Paine, Tom Tipper, Percy Bysshe Shelley, Richard Cobden and the Devil.

Songs were sometimes associated with ritual. Turn the Cup Over was a one-verse song which would be sung after completion of the summer's harvest and would be held in the open air or in a large hall. A 'chairman' would be appointed to pass the cup to each man in turn, who would drink while the other men sang. After his drink, the drinker would have to use the hat to throw the cup into the air and catch it as it fell. Failure to do so would compel the man to go through the ceremony again. Singing in the pub would also have ritualised elements. The 'chairman' would decide who should sing next. Some men, particularly older men, would have a song they would always sing, and it would have been considered impertinence for anyone else to attempt it.

Other singers included Michael Blann, a shepherd from Upper Beeding, George Attrill from Stopham, Hastings fisherman Noah Gillette. Often singing unaccompanied, Sussex's folk music also had musicians, including renowned fiddler, Michael Turner of Warnham. Taken from a tune by Mozart, Michael Turner's waltz is also known as the Sussex Waltz. Some singers like George 'Pop' Maynard in Copthorne and George 'Spike' Spicer in Selsfield in the Ashdown Forest gained a following from beyond their native Sussex. Tester noted that there were a large number of fiddle players in Ashdown Forest before the First World War but by the 1920s there were very few, changes which were reflected across England.

=== Folk revival ===
In the 1960s, English folk music went through a revival of interest, which was also true of folk music in Sussex. Scan Tester's recordings were published posthumously in the 1990 album I Never Played to Many Posh Dances (sometimes misquoted as "I Never Played Too Many Posh Dances"). Tester was an accomplished musician, playing the concertina, melodeon, bandoneon and fiddle. Sisters Dolly and Shirley Collins from Hastings gained some popularity in the 1960s, producing the 1967 album of mainly Sussex tunes, The Sweet Primeroses as well as the 1969 album Anthems in Eden. According to some commentators, many people believe that the folk-rock revolution of 1969 would not have happened without the album that Shirley Collins recorded with guitarist Davey Graham, released in 1964 as Folk Roots, New Routes". Shirley Collins founded the Etchingham Steam Band with her husband at the time Ashley Hutchings while they were living in Etchingham. It was formed after the break-up of the Albion Country Band and ended with the formation in 1976 of the Albion Dance Band. Founding Sussex's first folk club in 1958, Tony Wales also recorded the first LP of Sussex Folk Songs and Ballads in 1957 on the Folkways Records label in New York, and in 1961 organised the first Horsham Folk Festival.

=== 21st century ===
Singing under the name Young Coppers, the young generation of the Copper Family of Rottingdean continue the family tradition of singing, in what is at least the seventh generation to do so. They were also part of the original line-up of The Imagined Village, a project formed to represent the multicultural folk music traditions of the United Kingdom. Brighton-based folk-punk band The Levellers who formed in 1988 continue to play, winning the Roots Award at the 2011 BBC Radio 2 Folk Awards. Combining a vocal sound reminiscent of folk singers Sandy Denny and fellow Sussexian Shirley Collins with sounds from New Orleans and Vancouver, folk-blues band Smoke Fairies emerged in the early 2000s to acclaim, particularly in the United States. Passenger (real name Mike Rosenberg) achieved success in folk-alternative rock genre, both with the band Passenger and as a solo artist. Singer-songwriter Mary Hampton has been critically acclaimed, as have Hatful of Rain who combine folk music with bluegrass music. In 2016 Shirley Collins released Lodestar, her first new studio album in 38 years and the following year a documentary film about Collins' return to performing, The Ballad of Shirley Collins, was released.

The county has over twenty folk clubs and other venues hosting folk music. There are also annual folk music festivals at Eastbourne, Crawley, Bognor Regis and Lewes. In 2012, Sussex's traditional folk songs were being taught to new generations as part of a project by the South Downs Society, with money from the Heritage Lottery Fund. Following the end of this project in March 2013, the South Downs Folk Singers were formed to carry on singing the old songs in regular pub sessions and festivals throughout the Downs.

Since 2015 a cultural charity, Sussex Traditions, has created a public database of thousands of records, relating particularly to traditional song but also to Sussex traditions generally.

== Classical music ==
Sussex has also been home to many composers of classical music. It is highly likely that two of the three English choirbooks that survive from the early Tudor period originated in Sussex. The Caius Choirbook was presented from the Master of Arundel College to St Stephen's Chapel in Westminster; the Lambeth Choirbook (or Arundel Choirbook) remained at Arundel as a working choirbook. The Arundel choirbook contains works by several composers including Walter Lambe, a former lay clerk at Arundel. The Caius choirbook includes work by Edmund Turges. A tradition of performing polyphonic music was probably firmly entrenched by the end of the fifteenth century.

In 1588 Lewes-born singer Nicholas Yonge published the Musica transalpina, a collection of Italian madrigals with their words translated into English. These works were played by another Sussexian, Thomas Weelkes. Sometimes considered one of England's finest composers, Weelkes was better known as a drunkard than for his music.

Composer Ralph Vaughan Williams went to school in Rottingdean and married Adeline Fisher, daughter of historian Herbert William Fisher and cousin of writer Virginia Woolf and painter Vanessa Bell, in Hove in 1897. After collecting folk songs in Sussex, Vaughan Williams wrote Sussex Carol, which was the last of three carols he used in his Fantasia on Christmas Carols. Vaughan Williams used five folk songs he found in Sussex for the basis of his Fantasia on Sussex Folk Tunes. During the 1890s Gustav Holst played the trombone in the White Viennese Band on Brighton Pier under Stanislaus Wurm. Holst's ashes rest in the North transept of Chichester Cathedral. At the start of the Second World War Arnold Bax moved to Storrington, where he lived at the White Horse Inn.

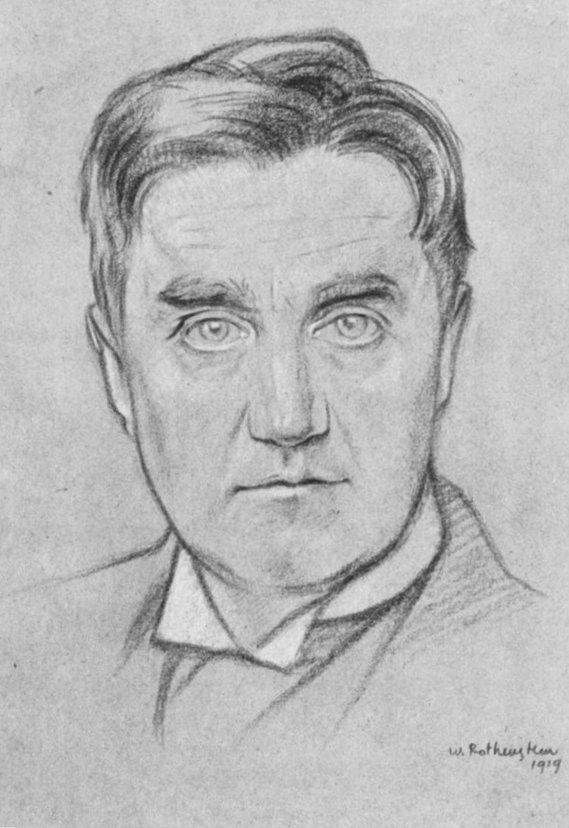
Ralph Vaughan Williams made several classical compositions based on the Sussex folk songs he recorded

Perhaps more than any other composer, John Ireland found inspiration for his music in the Sussex countryside, particularly the downland around Chanctonbury Ring. On his first visit he stayed in Ashington and over the next 30 years stayed frequently in Amberley, Ashington, Shipley and Steyning. Ireland's works inspired by the Sussex countryside include A Downland Suite, Amberley Wild Brooks, Legend for Piano and Orchestra (referring to a legend of ghostly children from a leper colony to be seen on Harrow Hill); Piano Sonata and Cello Sonatas inspired by the Devil's Jumps barrows.

Sir Hubert Parry, composed the music for anthem Jerusalem at his Rustington home. The words to And did those feet in ancient time had also been written in Sussex over a hundred years earlier by William Blake whilst living in Felpham. At Knights Croft House in Rustington, Parry wrote the Symphonic Fantasia '1912' (also called Symphony No. 5), the Ode on the Nativity and the Songs of Farewell. Parry also wrote Shulbrede Tunes after his daughter, Dorothea, and son-in-law, Arthur Ponsonby, moved to medieval Shulbrede Priory in Linchmere.

Sir Edward Elgar lived near Fittleworth from 1917 and while there wrote some of his finest chamber music including the A minor Piano Quintet and Cello Concerto before moving to Kempsey in Worcestershire. Debussy completed La mer in Eastbourne and wrote Reflets dans l'eau about an ornamental pond in Eastbourne's Devonshire Park. Sussex contralto Clara Butt was the first person to perform Elgar's Land of Hope and Glory.

Born of a working-class family in Brighton in 1879, Frank Bridge attended the Brighton School of Music, then joined the Royal College of Music in London, where he received the highest praise from Sir Hubert Parry. Bridge bought land on the South Downs at Friston where he had a cottage built. It was here that he wrote the orchestral suite The Sea, the Piano Sonata dedicated to composer Ernest Farrar, who was killed in action in France in World War One, Enter Spring (originally entitled On Friston Down), Oration for Cello and Orchestra, Phantasm for Piano and Orchestra, the Piano Trio No. 2, the Rebus Overture, the Violin Sonata No. 2, and the third and fourth String Quartets.

Probably Sussex's best-known native female composer, Ruth Gipps produced several orchestral works, including five symphonies and two piano concertos. Her clarinet sonata, Op 45, won the 1956 Cobbett Prize of the Society of Women Musicians.

The Chichester Psalms is a choral work by Leonard Bernstein for boy treble or countertenor, solo quartet, choir and orchestra. Commissioned for the 1965 Southern Cathedrals' Festival at Chichester Cathedral by the cathedral's organist, John Birch, and the Dean, Walter Hussey, the world premiere took place in the Philharmonic Hall, New York.

As a child, the composer John Tavener spent his summer holidays at Lady Birley's Sussex house, Charleston Manor where the grand piano was at his disposal and from where he visited Glyndebourne. From 1991 to 2000, Tavener lived with his family near Hurstpierpoint.

Composer Orlando Gough is best known for works written for ballet, contemporary dance and theatre. The composers Jonathan Harvey, Michael Finnissy and Martin Butler have all taught at Sussex University.

Major performers include violinist and violist Nigel Kennedy and the tenor Jonathan Ansell whose pop-opera boyband G4 were discovered in 2004 on the talent show The X Factor before embarking on a solo career in 2007.

Glyndebourne Festival Opera was founded in 1934 by John Christie and his wife, the soprano Audrey Mildmay in 1934 at Glyndebourne, one of the world's best known opera houses, and Britain's only unsubsidised opera house. The county is also home to professional orchestras the Brighton Philharmonic Orchestra, Hastings Philharmonic Orchestra and the Worthing Symphony Orchestra. Established in 2010, Worthing is the home of the Sussex International Piano Competition.

== Church music ==
Possibly the oldest surviving music from Sussex is the 14th century Robertsbridge Codex which contains six pieces of music. This manuscript contains one of the earliest pieces of music specifically written for the keyboard. The Robertsbridge Codex is also the earliest evidence of two handed, polyphonic organ music and dates from around 1325.

Robertsbridge Codex
An Estampie in polyphonic two-handed organ music from the Robertsbridge Codex

=== Hymns ===
Former vicar of Crawley and warden of Sackville College in East Grinstead, John Mason Neale is best known for writing the Christmas carol "Good King Wenceslas". The words to the hymn "Morning Has Broken", later a hit for Cat Stevens, were written by Eleanor Farjeon from her Alfriston home, inspired by the Sussex countryside. The village of Wadhurst gives its name to a hymn written by Michael Tippett.

=== Plainchant ===
During the COVID-19 pandemic of 2020—2021 an album released by the Poor Clares of Arundel became the UK's best-selling classical artist debut of 2020 and reached number 5 in the UK album chart in 2021.

== Music for radio, television and cinema ==
Inspired by the view across the English Channel from Selsey towards Bognor Regis, "By the Sleepy Lagoon" by Eric Coates has been used by BBC Radio 4 as the opening theme music for Desert Island Discs since 1942. Coates lived on the Manhood Peninsula, initially at Selsey and later at Sidlesham. Best known for his theme tunes for Doctor Who, Steptoe and Son, Tales of the Unexpected and The Prisoner, Australian-born composer Ron Grainer moved to Brighton in the 1970s and later died in Cuckfield.

The winner of a BAFTA Award and Oscar nomination for "Walking in the Air", Howard Blake grew up in Sussex and continues to live in the county. The song was used for the 1982 animated film The Snowman of the Sussex-based author Raymond Briggs. Blake also wrote the orchestral works in the film score for the film Flash Gordon.

== Jazz ==
Nat Gonella was part of the Brighton jazz scene and also a resident of Saltdean. In 2005, jazz pianist and vocalist Liane Carroll won two BBC Jazz Awards, while jazz composer and pianist Zoe Rahman received a Mercury Prize nomination for her 2006 album Melting Pot. Brighton-based singer Claire Martin has won the Best Vocalist award in the British Jazz Awards five times.

== Rock and popular music ==
=== 1950s ===
Singer of traditional pop music, Alma Cogan's career began with singing with a band at tea dances on Worthing Pier while at art college in the town. Cogan would appear in the UK Singles Chart eighteen times in the 1950s, with "Dreamboat" reaching no. 1. Other hits from this period include "I Can't Tell a Waltz from a Tango", "Why Do Fools Fall in Love", "Sugartime" and "The Story of My Life".

=== 1960s ===
Songwriter Mitch Murray wrote several number one singles including two 1963 songs for Gerry and the Pacemakers — "How Do You Do It?" (which was initially given to the Beatles) and "I Like It". Another songwriter, Ken Howard co-wrote "Have I the Right?" for The Honeycombs and "The Legend of Xanadu" for Dave Dee, Dozy, Beaky, Mick & Tich, both number one singles. Worthing was home in the late 1960s to the Worthing Workshop, a group of artists and musicians who included Leo Sayer, Brian James of The Damned, Billy Idol and Steamhammer, whose guitarist, Martin Quittenton, went on to co-write Rod Stewart's UK number one hits "You Wear It Well" and "Maggie May". Leapy Lee's 1968 single "Little Arrows" reached number two in the UK singles chart.

=== 1970s ===
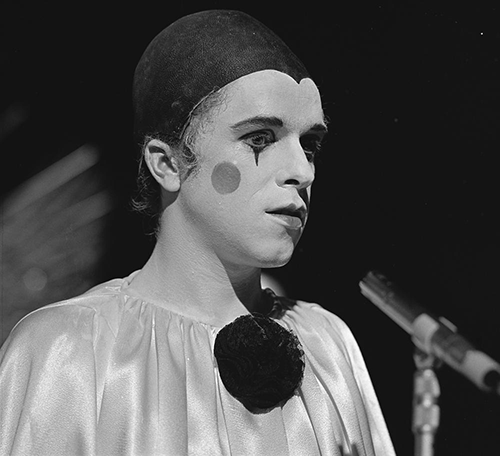
Leo Sayer performing on Dutch television in 1974

The 1970s were significant in Sussex as a field outside Worthing hosted Phun City, the UK's first large-scale free music festival. The Brighton Dome hosted the 1974 Eurovision Song Contest, won by the Swedish group ABBA for their song "Waterloo", which propelled them to worldwide fame. The Cure formed in Crawley, beginning their long career in gothic indie rock. October 1976 saw Leo Sayer's song "You Make Me Feel Like Dancing" reach number one on the United States Billboard Hot 100 chart, making it his first number-one single in United States, also winning a Grammy Award for the song in 1978 in the category Best R&B Song. Sayer's first UK number one followed in 1977 for his version of "When I Need You" 1979 saw the release of One Step Beyond..., the debut album of Madness, a band formed in London by the Hastings-born singer-songwriter Suggs (real name Graham McPherson).

=== 1980s ===
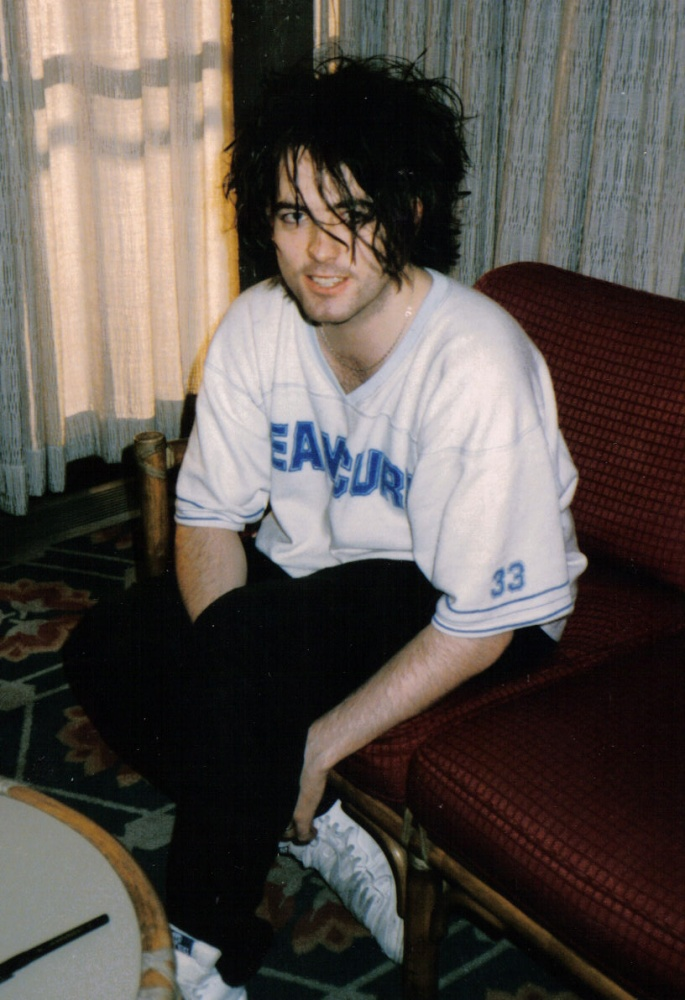
Robert Smith of The Cure in San Francisco, USA, 1985

Sussex bands achieved only limited success in the 1980s, with The Popguns being one of the best-known and These Animal Men achieving minor fame as part of the so-called New wave of new wave and The Levellers began their careers merging folk with punk music. Punk band The Piranhas had a top 10 hit single in 1980 with their cover version of the South African kwela song "Tom Hark". 1983 saw The Cure get their first UK top ten hit, "The Love Cats". Their 1987 album Kiss Me, Kiss Me, Kiss Me saw them move into the mainstream and their 1989 album Disintegration was released to critical acclaim, reaching number three in the UK album chart. Brett Anderson and Mat Osman from Haywards Heath helped form Suede in 1989 and were hailed as "the best new band in Britain", winning the 1993 Mercury Prize for their debut album Suede and kick-starting the Britpop movement. Guitarist Richard Durrant also began his career in the 1980s; the house music of DJ John Digweed also rose to prominence in the 1980s.

=== 1990s ===
The 1990s saw an increase in bands from Sussex including Keane, The Feeling, Toploader and Clearlake. Bob Stanley helped form London-based indie dance-pop band Saint Etienne, which had some success in the 1990s including a Mercury award nomination for their 1991 album Foxbase Alpha. Brighton-based Beats International had a number one single in 1990 with "Dub Be Good to Me". Phats & Small also achieved some success in dance music, particularly with their 1999 single "Turn Around". Samantha Janus finished 10th in the 1991 Eurovision Song Contest with A Message to Your Heart having won the UK national final A Song for Europe. The Cure released their most commercially successful album, Wish in 1992 which reached number one in the UK and number two in the United States, where it sold more than 1.2 million copies. In the 1990s, Suede had released three albums that went to number one in the UK album chart. These were Suede, the Mercury-nominated Coming Up and Head Music. 1995's Zeitgeist was the Levellers' most commercially successful album, reaching number one in the UK album chart. Songwriter and record producer, Barry Upton co-created with Steve Crosby the million-selling pop band Steps in 1997. Simon Fuller, who grew up in Hastings, managed several acts including in the Spice Girls in the mid 1990s, where he first came to significance, going on create the Idol franchise, which was first seen in the UK under the name Pop Idol. Billboard magazine has since been certified Fuller as the most successful British music manager to date.

=== 2000s ===
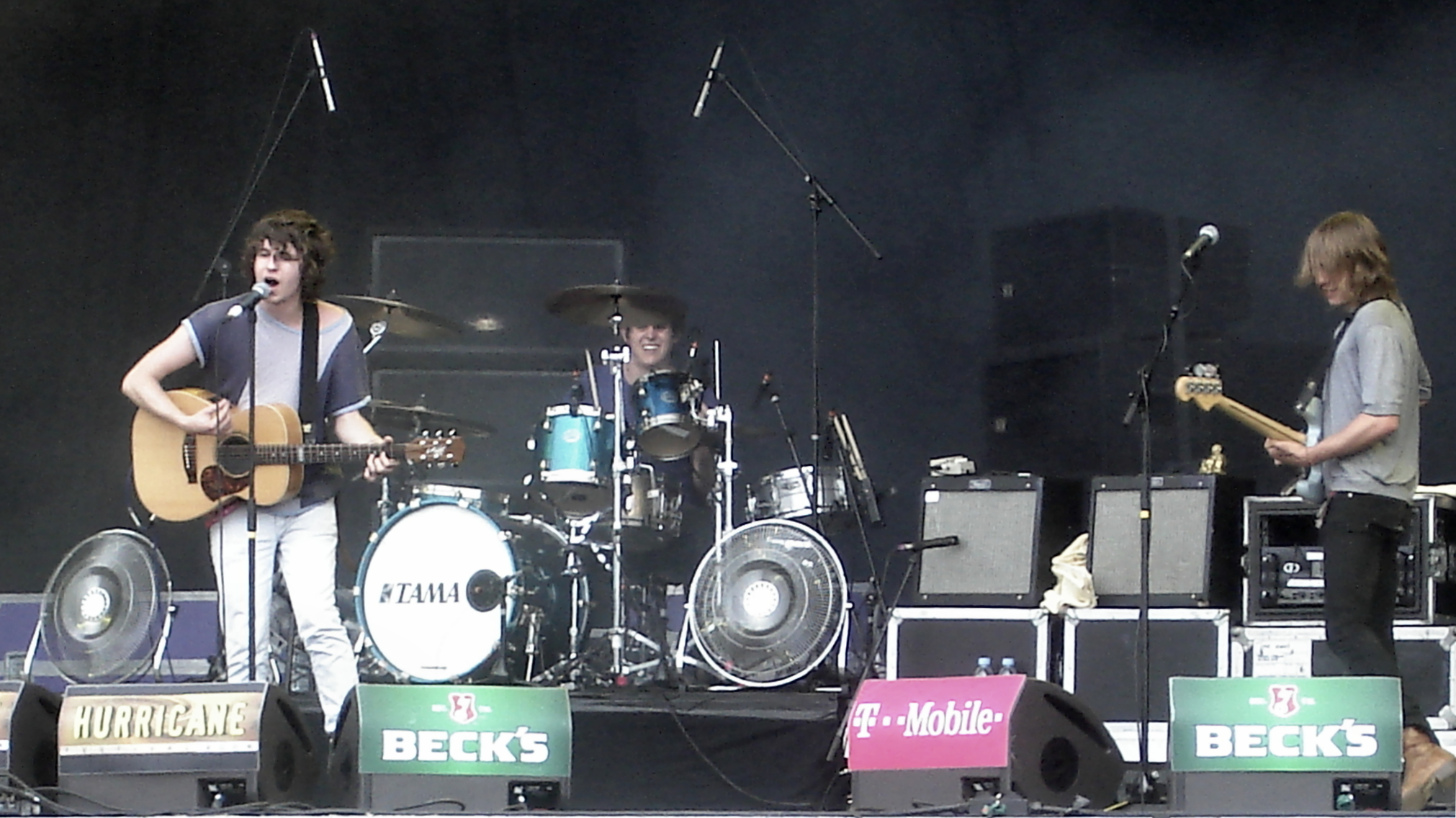
The Kooks at the Hurricane Festival, Germany 2006

The 21st century saw an increase in popular bands from Sussex, and Brighton in particular, as well as seeing the formation of the Brighton Institute of Modern Music, in collaboration with the University of Sussex. Popular artists include Ed Harcourt, whose 2001 album Here Be Monsters was nominated for a Mercury Prize, British Sea Power (nominated for a Mercury Prize for Do You Like Rock Music?), The Go! Team (nominated for a Mercury Prize for Thunder, Lightning, Strike), The Kooks, The Electric Soft Parade (nominated for a Mercury Prize for Holes in the Wall), The Ordinary Boys, The Pipettes, Brakes, Architects, Blood Red Shoes and Dead Swans. Keane's 2004 debut album Hopes and Fears won a Brit Award and a Mercury Prize nomination, and went to number one in the UK album chart. Keane's follow up albums Under The Iron Sea and Perfect Symmetry also rose to the top of the UK album chart. 2004 saw Brett Anderson reunite with ex-Suede bandmate Bernard Butler in The Tears. The band was short-lived, disbanding in 2006, after the critically acclaimed debut album Here Come The Tears. 2004 also saw Haywards Heath-born singer-songwriter, Natasha Bedingfield's debut album Unwritten as well as the single "These Words" both reach number one in the UK charts. The 2005 Mercury Music Prize winner Antony Hegarty, whose band Antony and the Johnsons won with I Am a Bird Now was born and grew up in Chichester. In 2002, Brighton-based Norman Cook (aka Fatboy Slim) held a concert on Brighton beach, attended by 250,000. Since 2006, Brighton has been home to a major festival of new music, The Great Escape Festival. The Kooks' second album, Konk reached number one in the UK album chart in 2008.

=== 2010s ===
Hip hop duo Rizzle Kicks released their first album, Stereo Typical, in 2011 and as of May 2012 had sold over 1 million singles and over 600,000 albums in the UK. DJ Fresh achieved two number one UK singles in 2012 including "Louder", the first from the genre of dubstep and "Hot Right Now", the first drum and bass number one. Conor Maynard's debut album Contrast reached number one in the UK album charts in 2012. Also in 2012, Keane's album Strangeland reached number one in the UK chart. Drawing comparisons with fellow Sussex artists, Keane, and known for emotive piano-led songs, Tom Odell became the first male artist to win the BRITs Critics' Choice Award in early 2013. Passenger (real name Michael Rosenberg) was nominated for British Single of the Year at the 2014 BRIT Awards for "Let Her Go" which topped the charts in several countries. In 2014, Royal Blood's eponymous debut album Royal Blood reached number one in the UK album chart, the fastest-selling British rock debut album in the UK in three years. The album was nominated for a Mercury prize and won Royal Blood a Brit Award for best British group. Royal Blood's 2017 follow-up album How Did We Get So Dark? also reached number one in the UK album chart. In 2016, Anohni became the second openly transgender person nominated for an Academy Award, for the song "Manta Ray" in the film Racing Extinction. Her debut solo album, Hopelessness, was released in May 2016 to wide critical acclaim, and was nominated for the 2016 Mercury Music Prize. Tom Odell's second album Wrong Crowd charted at number 2 album in the UK. Singer-songwriter Rag'n'Bone Man won the 2017 Critics' Choice (Brit Award) as well as a nomination for the 2017 Brit Award for British Breakthrough Act. His album Human was a number one hit in several European countries including Germany, and reached number two in the UK. His album, also called Human, debuted at number one on the UK Albums Chart on sales of 117,000, making it the fastest-selling debut album by a male artist during the 2010s. Indie rock band Black Honey also achieved some success with their self-titled 2018 album Black Honey.

=== 2020s ===
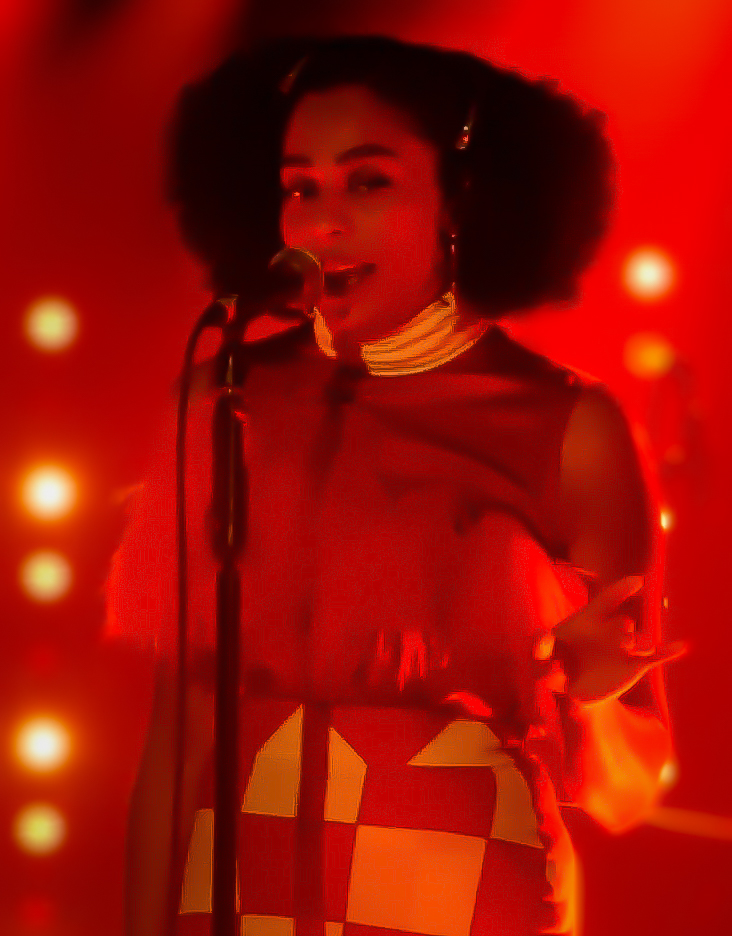
Celeste in 2019

Saltdean soul singer Celeste was tipped for success in 2020 after winning the 2020 Brit Award for Rising Star, the BBC's Sound of 2020 music poll as well as the BBC Music Award for Introducing Artist of the Year. She was included in lists of artists to watch by publications such as The Guardian, Vogue, NME, GQ, MTV, Vevo and Amazon Music. She was described by Nick Reilly of NME as "the finest British soul singer to emerge in years". With Not Your Muse, Celeste became the first British female artist in five years to have a number one debut album on the UK Albums Chart and received a nomination for the 2021 Mercury Prize.

Porridge Radio's 2020 album Every Bad was nominated for the 2020 Mercury Prize.

In addition to Celeste's debut album, 2021 saw the release of several albums from Sussex artists including Architects' For Those That Wish to Exist, Royal Blood's Typhoons and Rag'n'Bone Man's Life by Misadventure (all number 1 in the UK charts); Passenger's Songs for the Drunk and Broken Hearted and Maisie Peters' debut album, You Signed Up for This (both number 2 in the UK charts); Black Honey's Written & Directed and Squid's debut album, Bright Green Field.

== See also ==
- Culture of Sussex
