= The Great Escape Festival =

Annual music festival in Brighton and Hove, England

The Great Escape
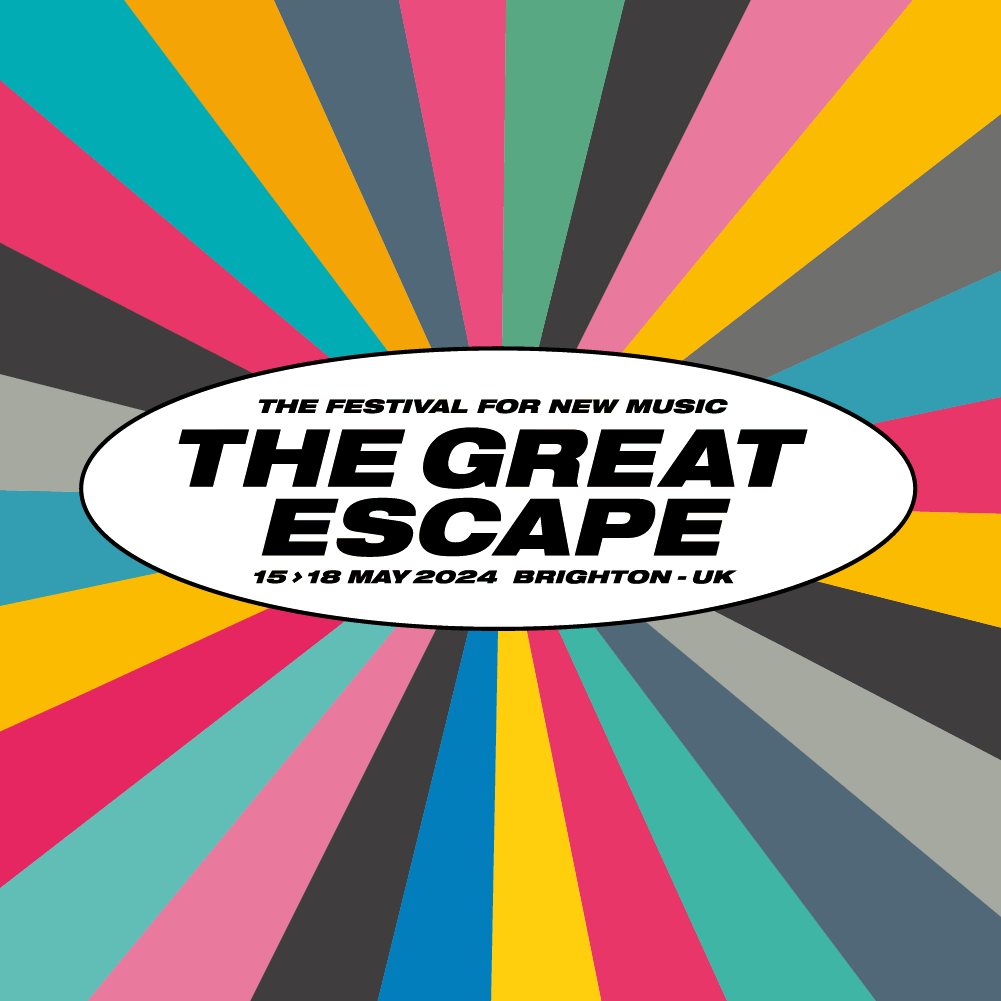
- Genre: Rock, alternative rock, indie rock, punk rock, hard rock, dance, techno, electronic, acoustic, hip hop
- Locations: Brighton and Hove, England
- Years active: 20 years
- Most recent: 2026
- Next event: 12–15 May 2027
- Website: greatescapefestival.com

The Great Escape Festival is a four-day music festival held in Brighton and Hove, England every year in May. It is operated by MAMA Festivals and showcases new music from a variety of genres. The festival was founded in 2006 and hosts roughly 500 bands across 30 venues throughout the city. It has been likened to South by Southwest.

There is also a music industry convention section to the event, which is attended by over 4000 delegates. The 2011 to 2022 conferences have been programmed by the team from music industry publication CMU.

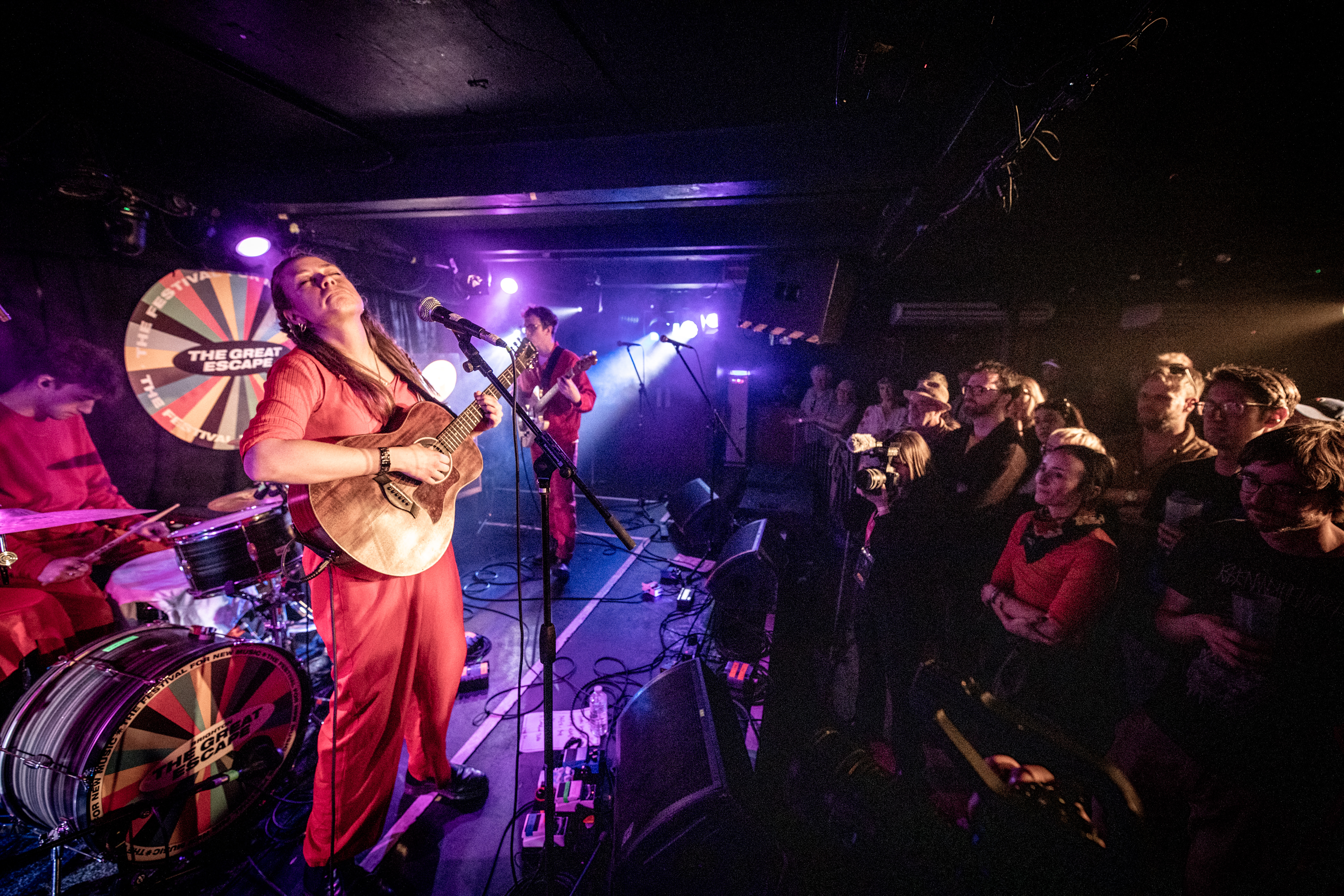
Anna B Savage, 2023

In addition to the main festival, there is also The Alternative Escape, a further strand of 'unofficial' shows.

There was no event in 2020, and the festival was held in 2021 but was entirely online, both due to the COVID-19 pandemic.

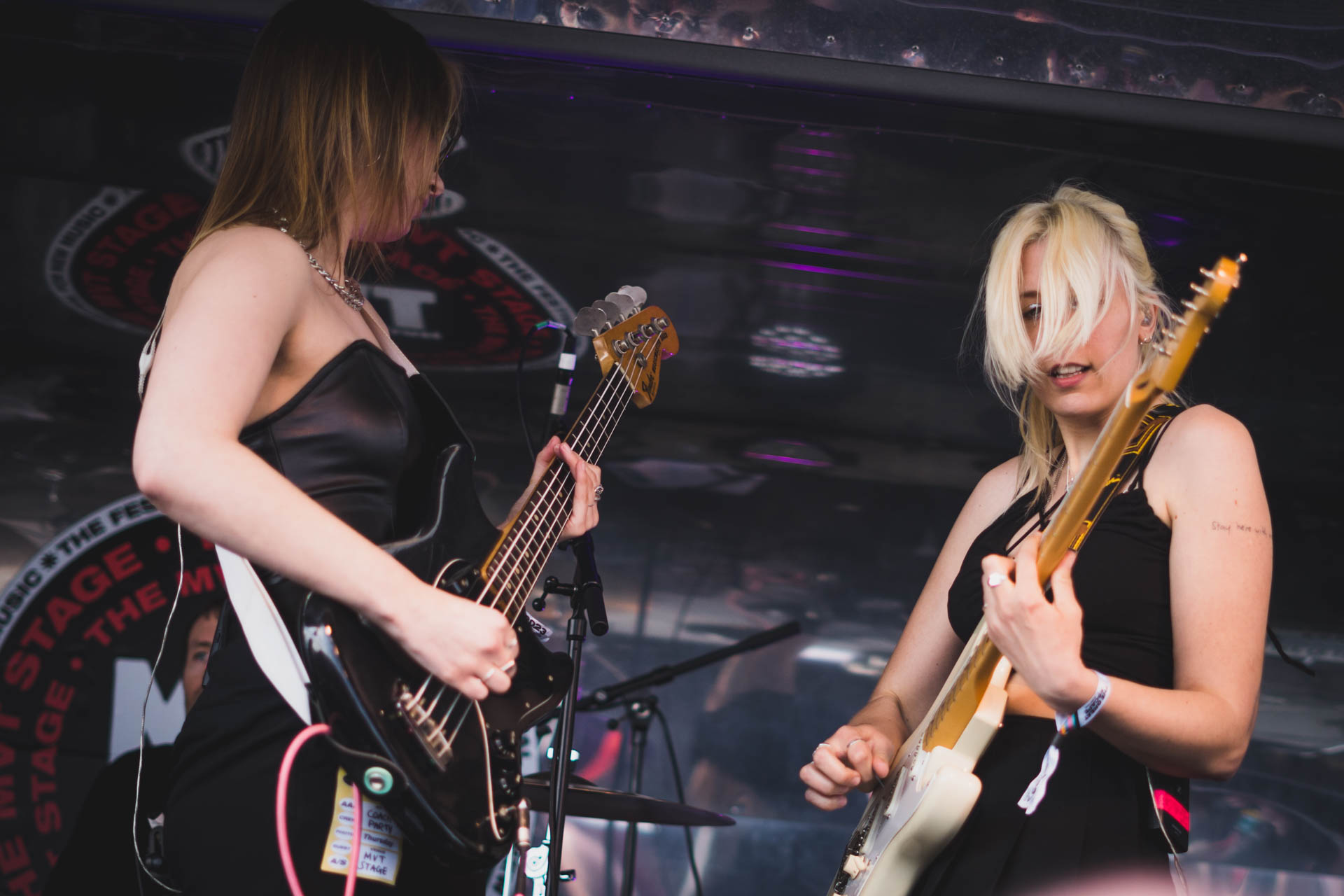
Coach Party, 2023

In 2024, over half of the lineup signed an open letter to the festival to drop Barclaycard as a sponsor due to its involvement in the supply of arms to Israeli military forces. Over 163 bands pulled out of the festival in protest, resulting in the opening showcase being cancelled.

== See also ==
- Music of Sussex
