= Copper Family =

English folk singers

The Copper Family are a family of singers of traditional, unaccompanied English folk song. Originally from Rottingdean, near Brighton, Sussex, England, the nucleus of the family now live in the neighbouring village of Peacehaven. The family first came to the attention of folklorists in the late nineteenth century and received wider attention during the folk revival of the 1960s.

They have a unique style of harmonised a capella singing, which is in stark contrast to the typical style of solo singing found among English folk singers. It is unknown whether this style is a remnant of something that was once popular, or if it is a unique phenomenon.

Unlike many traditional singers, the family wrote down their own songs.

Their singing style has been passed down through several generations along with their repertoire of local songs.

== History ==
The Copper family has lived in Rottingdean since the sixteenth century, where they have worked as farm bailiffs, publicans, policemen and occasionally as soldiers. The songs are thought to have been passed down for hundreds of years; George Copper, born in Rottingdean in 1784, was a celebrated singer in the village. Some of the songs which remain in the family, including "The Shepherd of the Downs" (Roud 1215) were taught by George Copper to his grandson James ‘Brasser’ Copper (1845–1924), who passed them on.

Rudyard Kipling, who lived in Rottingdean, was familiar with the family and mentioned them in Rewards and Fairies (1899).

=== Discovery ===
In 1898, the family were approached by Kate Lee, one of the founders of the Folk Song Society (later the English Folk Dance and Song Society). James 'Brasser' Copper (1845–1924) and his brother Thomas (c.1847–c.1936) sang songs to Kate Lee as she plied them with whiskey. 'Brasser' wrote the songs down, some of which were published in the inaugural volume of the Journal of the Folk Song Society in 1899, and the two brothers were made honorary members of the society.

Vic Gammon notes in the leaflet accompanying the society's archive CD Come Write Me Down that both the collecting of songs and their unaccompanied singing were less common than is often imagined at this time and that Lee, a singer herself, knew she had found something special when she encountered the Coppers.

=== Recordings and performances ===
'Brasser' had two sons, John (c.1879–1952) and Jim (1882–1954). Jim, who wrote a further volume of songs in 1936, had two children – Joyce (1910–2006) and Bob (1915–2004). In 1950, Jim and Bob were invited to sing on an episode of the BBC Radio programme Country Magazine and, over the next few years, the BBC would record them further, even producing a feature The Life of James Copper, broadcast in September 1951.

John's son was Walter Ronald, known as Ron (c.1913–1979). Together, Jim, John, Ron and Bob sang at the Royal Albert Hall and wider public attention followed the broadcast of a six-part television series Song Hunter, presented by Alan Lomax and featuring Jim, Bob and Ron. Bob wrote several books about the family and its songs, beginning with the widely acclaimed A Song For Every Season in 1971. The accompanying 4-LP set (now a collector's item) found Bob and Ron singing alongside Bob's daughter Jill and son John, bringing a further generation into the family tradition. The death of Ron was followed by the introduction of Jill's husband Jon into the core line-up, and some of Bob's grandchildren began to appear with the group. The six grandchildren (Jill's children Mark, Andy and Sean Barratt, and John's children Ben, Lucy and Tom Copper) now also appear independently as The Young Coppers, singing the same family repertoire.

At the age of 87, Bob Copper travelled to New York to meet Pete Seeger, and a programme featuring their conversation, songs and views on their family traditions and on folk music in general was broadcast on Radio 4 in 2002.

== Legacy ==
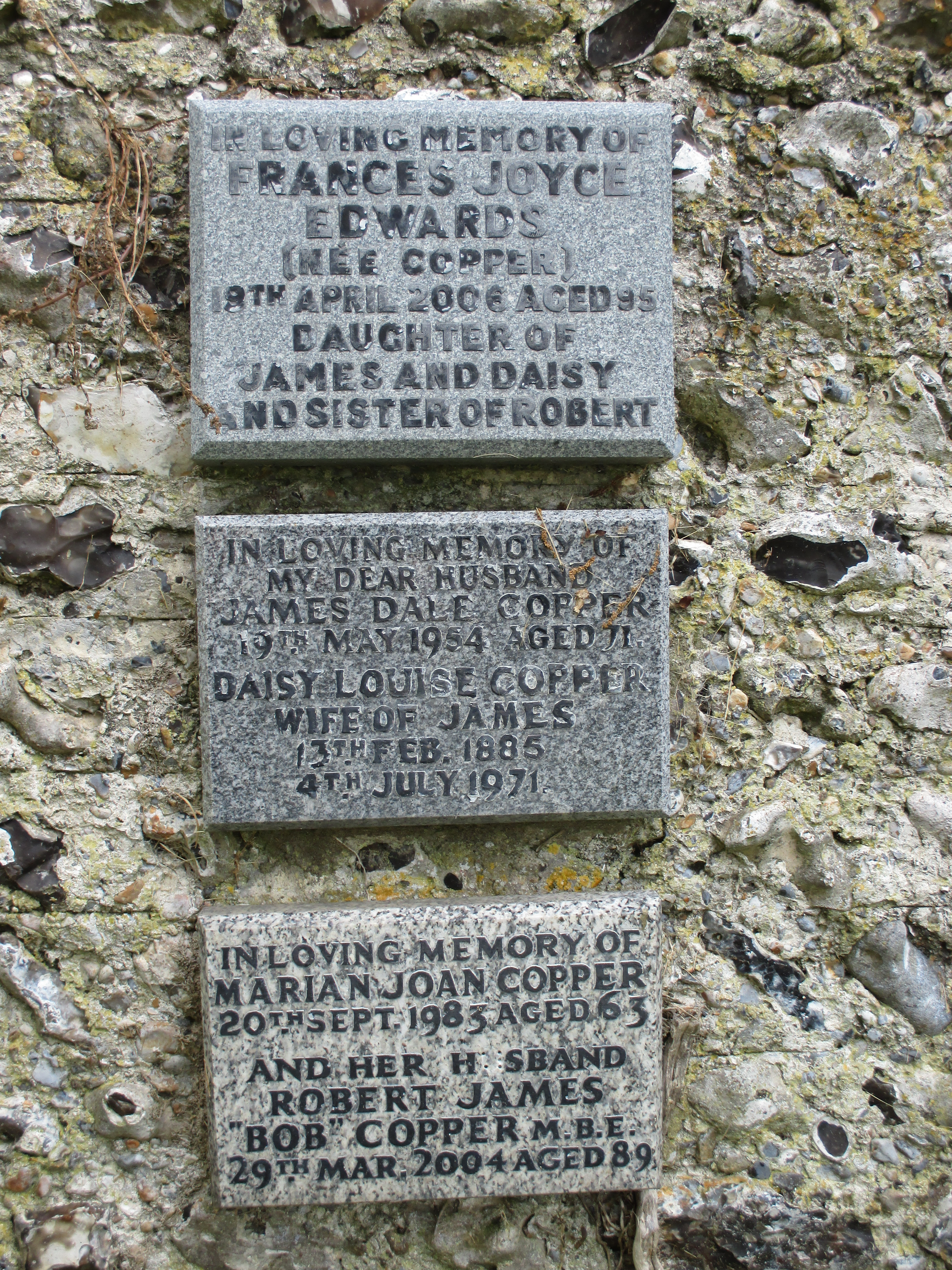
Memorial plaques to members of the Copper family, including Jim and Bob Copper, in the churchyard of St Margaret's Church, Rottingdean

Various recordings of the family's singing have been made since the 1950s and some are still available, notably the aforementioned Come Write Me Down, which comes with two booklets full of biographical detail. In the 1980s, Bob Copper published the book Across Sussex with Belloc in which he retraced the route across Sussex of Hilaire Belloc and the characters of Belloc's novel The Four Men: a Farrago. Bob Copper died in 2004, a few days after receiving an MBE. In an obituary by Ken Hunt in The Independent newspaper, Bob Copper was described as "England's most important traditional folk-singer".

In The Guardian obituary, Michael Grosvenor Myer wrote "Towards the end of his life, Bob frequently expressed the greatest satisfaction that the family's fine tradition was safe for at least the next two generations". The present generations of the family continue to sing unaccompanied traditional songs and, in 2004 (repeated in 2006), BBC Four broadcast an hour-long programme about the family, filmed during the last months of Bob's life. They are involved in The Imagined Village project.

Bob Copper received the Gold Badge of the English Folk Dance and Song Society in 1978, an honorary degree from Sussex University in 2000, and an MBE four days before his death in 2004.

In 2009 Topic Records included in their 70-year anniversary boxed set Three Score and Ten Spencer the Rover by Bob & Ron from the album Come Write Me Down – Early Recordings of The Copper Family of Rottingdean as track two of the second CD in the set.

The family have been described as "the first family of English roots music, vital to its history and a frame of reference for the new generation that is reviving a tradition of earthy, hard edged story based music".

== Discography ==
- Traditional Songs From Rottingdean (English Folk Dance & Song Society LP, 1963)
- A Song For Every Season (Leader 4-LP box set, 1971)
- A Song For Every Season (Leader LP, selections from the box set, 1971)
- The Banks of Claudy (Folktrax LP, 1975)
- Twankydillo (Folktrax cassette, 1975)
- Sweet Rose in June (Topic LP, 1977)
- Come All You Bold Britons (Folktrax cassette, 1983)
- Adam and Eve (Folktrax cassette, 1983)
- Coppersongs: A Living Tradition (English Folk Dance & Song Society LP, 1987)
- Coppersongs 2 (CD, 1995)
- Coppersongs 3: The Legacy Continues (CD, 1998)
- Come Write Me Down (Topic CD, 2001)

== See also ==
- The official Copper Family website
- Deep Rooted - YouTube channel run by members of the Copper Family with videos about their music and traditions
- Music of Sussex
- List of traditional singers
