= Henry Burstow =

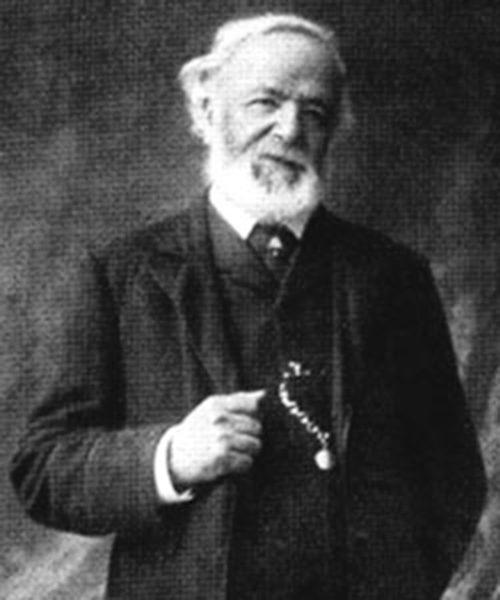

Background information
- Born: 11 December 1826; Horsham, Sussex, England
- Died: 1916
- Genres: Folk music
- Occupations: Shoemaker, bellringer
- Instrument: Vocals

Henry Burstow (1826–1916) was a shoemaker and bellringer from Horsham, Sussex, best known for his vast repertoire of songs, many of which were collected in the folksong revival of the late nineteenth and early twentieth centuries. He was also the author of Reminiscences of Horsham, which gives a lively picture of life in a rural town in the mid-nineteenth century.

== Life and character ==
He was born in Horsham on 11 December 1826, the son of William and Ellen Burstow, makers of clay tobacco pipes. He attended school into his teens, sometimes also working part-time for his mother or for a harness maker, until in 1840 he was apprenticed to a shoemaker. Soon afterwards, John Vaughan, his master's father and also the sexton and head bellringer at Horsham parish church, invited him to become one of the bellringers. This was to become a major part of his life, both as an occupation and for evenings spent with his fellow ringers, an occasion for singing, his other main interest. Learning of Horsham's achievements in ringing changes in the late eighteenth century, he became dissatisfied with the current standards of bellringing in Horsham and took to walking to neighbouring villages to ring changes with more skilled groups, particularly in Warnham and Newdigate. By the time he retired from bellringing he would have rung changes in 55 belfries and taught ringing in 15 of them. On 30 April 1855 he married Elizabeth Pratt (1833-1909); he celebrated his wedding day by ringing the church bells all day long with seven other shoemakers. Shoemaking paid poorly, especially as ready made shoes began to undercut the market, and in 1907 Burstow and his wife were facing the prospect of the workhouse. William Albery (1865-1950), a saddler, organized a fund to provide a pension and also collected the Reminiscences, editing them and arranging for their publication to benefit Burstow. He died on 30 January 1916, having lived all his life in Horsham.

Burstow's chief talent was a remarkably strong memory, as he himself was well aware:

Very soon after I was born I began to develop a faculty with which I may say, without boasting, I was endowed in an extraordinary degree. I inherited a tenacious memory, to which from babyhood upwards I committed particulars of numerous events and incidents, tales and songs: once my observations … were … committed to memory, nothing has been able to dispossess me of them.

This memory served his interests in bellringing and singing well and provided the material for the Reminiscences. Albery describes him as "an honest and bold Freethinker" and he was remembered in Horsham as an admirer of Darwin and an atheist. Local tradition tells that when reproached by the Rev. H.B. Ottley for not attending the church services his bell-ringing had announced, he replied, "I fetch 'em in, and I leaves you to drive 'em away."

== Folksongs ==
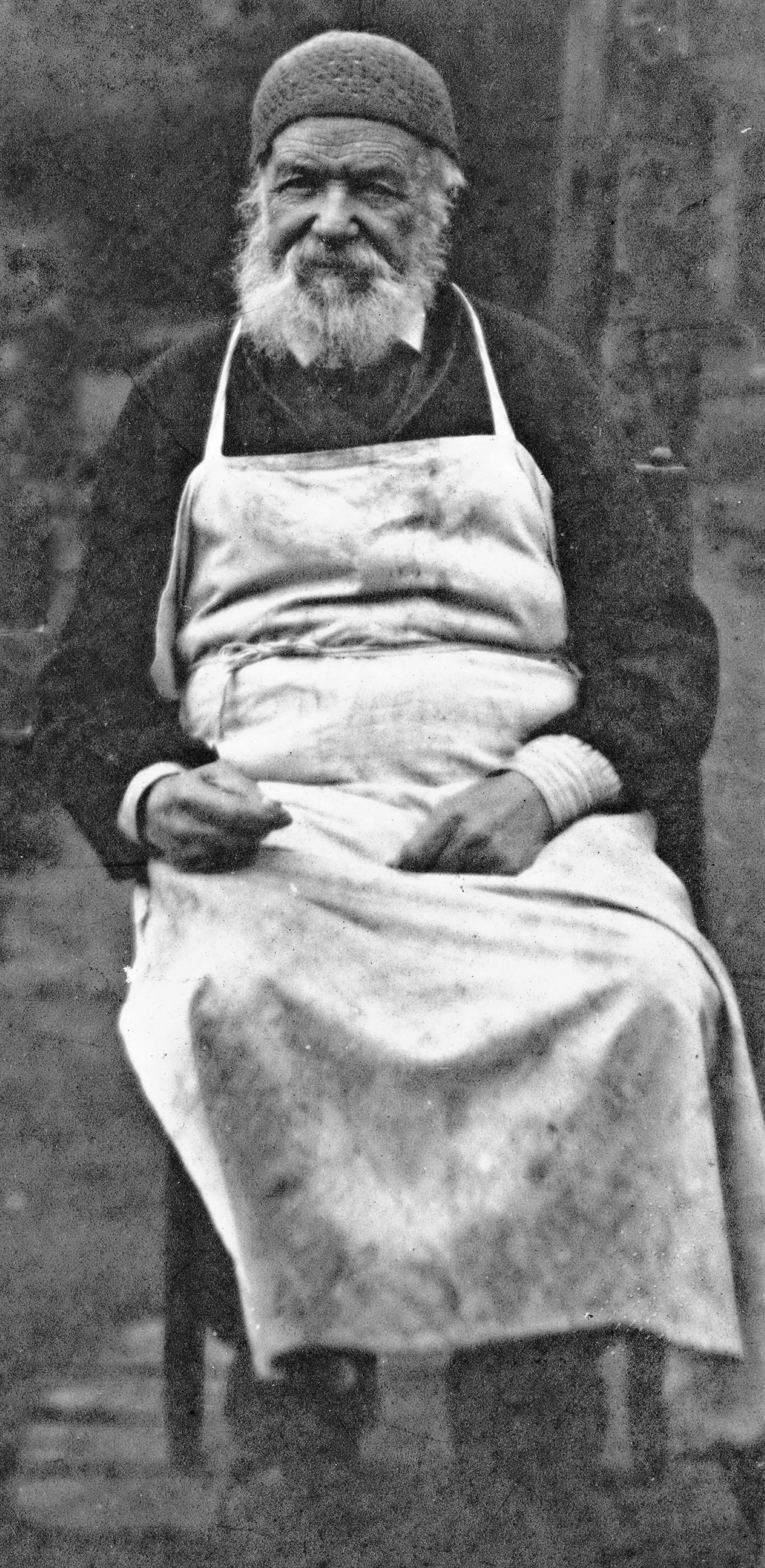
Henry Burstow

Burstow writes that he knew 420 songs. He kept a list of them, which he gives at the end of his book. Eighty-two of these were learnt from his father (marked with an asterisk in the list). Others came from his mother or from friends, sometimes exchanged for another song or a pint of beer. The remainder came from ballad sheets. In his enthusiasm, he himself pursued songs very much as a collector:

He once set his heart upon learning a very long ballad "off" a fellow bell-ringer, a ploughman in a neighbouring village. The ploughman declined to sing it …, saying, "No, you wants to laugh at my burr!" … So Mr. Burstow plotted. He induced a friend to lure the ploughman into the front parlour of a tavern, himself hiding in the back room. After a time Mr. Burstow's accomplice challenged the ploughman to sing as long a "ballet" as himself. A duel of songs arose; the ballads grew and grew in length. At last the ploughman, filled with desire to "go one verse better" than his opponent, burst out into the very song for which the bell-ringer was patiently waiting. He learned it then and there!

In 1892 or 1893, Burstow wrote to the folksong collector Lucy Broadwood and she collected a large number of songs from him, so that his is the major contribution to her English Traditional Songs and Carols (London, 1908). Broadwood also suggested Burstow as a source to Ralph Vaughan Williams, who collected several songs, some with a phonograph, of which Burstow writes:

This was the first time I had seen or heard one of these marvellous machines, and I was amazed beyond expression to hear my own songs thus repeated in my own voice.

Burstow's repertoire contained many folksongs as understood by the collectors of the time, but also much unwanted material from known and published composers and from relatively recent broadside ballads. Broadwood's account of folksong collecting gives a picture of this poor fit:

We must listen with becoming reverence to "Silver Threads amongst the Golden," to Eliza Cook's "Old Armchair," or to "Sweet Alice, Ben Bolt"; we must wag our pencil hypocritically over our music-paper should we wish later to hear the ballad of "Long Lamkin," "Lord Thomas and Fair Eleanor," "Death and the Lady," or the like. And we must never take for granted that a dirge on Napoleon, or the lamentation of a convict hanged a few years ago, can be skipped, for modern doggerel is often wedded to the oldest tunes.

For comparison, Burstow's list begins with five ballads on Napoleon and includes "John Lawrence" (presumably the "Last Dying Confession" of John Lawrence, hanged at Horsham in 1844), "Ben Bolt" and "Silver Threads Among the Gold".

== Reminiscences of Horsham ==
Albery, the editor of the Reminiscences, had known Burstow from childhood, when he had been a choirboy at Horsham parish church. He had listened with interest to the old man's reminiscences of life in the first half of the century. The book thus served two purposes, to provide for Burstow and to make available information on the history of Horsham, a deep interest of Albery, who would publish much on local history in coming years. The book had two impressions, of five and four hundred copies.

On the centenary of Burstow's death, in 2016, the Horsham Museum Society published an expanded edition of the Reminiscences.

Among many interesting details of rural town life, the book describes poverty-inspired unrest in the 1830s and the local children's enthusiasm for the cavalry billeted there to suppress it; the reform election of 1832 and the disorderly conduct of that and other elections; the "Beggar pooker", employed by the town to move on beggars and equipped for this with a six-foot pole; seasonal celebrations, most notably St. Crispin's Day, on which an effigy of a townsperson who had attracted disapproval would be hung from a pub's signpost until 5 November, when it would be taken down and burnt.

== See also ==
- Music of Sussex
