= James Broadwood =

Piano maker

James Shudi Broadwood (20 December 1772 – 8 August 1851) was a piano maker in London working for the family company John Broadwood & Sons. He was also a magistrate in Surrey.

James Shudi Broadwood was born on 20 December 1772 at Great Pulteney Street, London. His parents, John Broadwood, piano manufacturer, and Barbara Shudi, daughter of Burkat Shudi, the harpsichord maker, had married in 1769. His mother died in 1776 at the age of 27. James was sent to France in 1785, to learn the French language, but returned to London to join his father's business. In 1795, John Broadwood took him into partnership, giving a half share of the family firm, which he renamed "John Broadwood & Son". James' half-brother, Thomas Broadwood, subsequently joined the business and it became John Broadwood & Sons on 1 January 1808.

James Broadwood was commissioned as a Lieutenant in the Royal Westminster Volunteers in April 1797 and on 8 March 1799 he became a captain of the regiment. He married Sophia Bridget Colville on 11 July 1797 at St James's Church, Piccadilly. A son, John, was born the following year and a daughter, Elizabeth, in 1799. Following the death of Elizabeth, at six weeks old, he purchased Lyne Farm in Surrey and moved his family there from London. A second son was born in Surrey in 1800, but Sophia died on 26 August 1801 at the age of 22.

On 11 June 1804, James Broadwood married his second wife, Margaret Schaw Stewart, at St Marylebone Parish Church. The second marriage produced three further sons, and a daughter, Mary. In 1799, he was appointed "Organ Builder in Ordinary to His Majesty" (George III). James' father, John Broadwood, died at the age of 80, on 17 July 1812. James became High Sheriff of Surrey in 1835.

James Shudi Broadwood died on 8 August 1851. He was buried in Rusper Church, a few miles from his home at Lyne. Margaret, his second wife, had died on 3 April 1849.

His son, Henry Fowler Broadwood (1811–1893), took control of the family piano-manufacturing business in 1836. He was also the father of the folk song collector John Broadwood (1798–1864).

== Bibliography ==
- Wainwright, David (1982). Broadwood by Appointment. London: Quiller Press. ISBN 978-0-90-762110-2.
- Beale, Robert (2007). Charles Hallé: A Musical Life. Ashgate Publishing. ISBN 978-0-75-466137-5.
