= Kate Lee (English singer) =

British singer and folksong collector

- Born: Catharine Anna Spooner; 9 March 1859; Rufford, Nottinghamshire
- Died: 25 July 1904 (aged 45); Stubbings, Maidenhead

Kate Lee, born Catharine Anna Spooner (9 March 1859 – 25 July 1904), was an English singer and folksong collector, one of the founders of the Folk-Song Society in 1898.

== Early life and education ==
She was born in Rufford, Nottinghamshire, one of the ten children of Lucius Henry Spooner and Margaret Skottowe Parker Spooner. Her father was a land agent who died in 1874; her mother was from Ireland. Her cousins included William Archibald Spooner, who gave his name to the "spoonerism".

Spooner entered the Royal Academy of Music in January 1876 with the ambition to become a singer. After marriage and motherhood, Lee resumed her studies at the Royal College of Music from 1887 to 1889.

== Career ==
Lee had a short but busy professional singing career. She sang in a Drury Lane production of Die Walküre in 1894, and had her debut concert the following year. She also sang at campaign events when her husband ran for a seat in Parliament in 1895. She was described variously as a contralto or a mezzo-soprano in range. In 1900, she gave her last performance, singing to illustrate her lecture on folk song.

Lee also collected folksongs, often while bicycling in the countryside, notably from James and Thomas Copper. She wrote about them in an 1899 article, "Some Experiences of a Folk-Song Collector". "I shall never forget the delight of hearing the two Mr. Coppers, who gave me the songs," she recalled, "They were so proud of their Sussex songs, and sang them with an enthusiasm grand to hear." She was a member of the Irish Literary Society, and in 1898 was one of the leading figures in convening the first meetings of the Folk-Song Society. She became the Society's first secretary, but illness soon required that she hand over the work to Lucy Broadwood.

== Personal life ==
Catharine Anna Spooner married barrister and sugar merchant Arthur Morier Lee (1847–1909) in December 1877. She had two sons, Phillip (1879–1914) and Archibald (born 1881). In 1900 she became ill with cancer, and she died at Stubbings near Maidenhead in 1904.
