= Lucy Broadwood =

English folksong collector and researcher

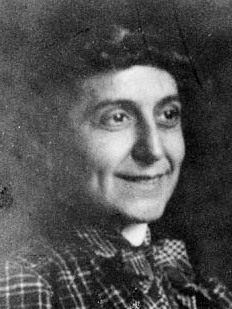
Lucy Broadwood

Lucy Etheldred Broadwood (9 August 1858 – 22 August 1929) was an English-Scottish folksong collector and researcher, and great-granddaughter of John Broadwood, founder of the piano manufacturers Broadwood and Sons. As one of the founder members of the Folk-Song Society and editor of the Folk-Song Journal, she was one of the main influences of the British folk revival of that period. She was an accomplished singer, composer, piano accompanist, and amateur poet. She was much sought after as a song and choral singing adjudicator at music festivals throughout England, and was also one of the four main organisers of the Leith Hill Music Festival in Surrey from its commencement in 1904 until her death in 1929.

== Life and work ==
=== Early life and family ===
She was born on 9 August 1858, at the Pavilion, the summer residence that her father rented at Melrose in Scotland. She was the daughter of piano manufacturer Henry Fowler Broadwood (1811–1893) (eldest son of James Shudi Broadwood) and his wife Juliana Maria née Birch, and great granddaughter of John Broadwood, the founder of Broadwood and Sons, piano manufacturers. She was the youngest of eleven children (two boys and nine girls). Henry's mother was of Scottish descent and from her he had learnt the ballad "The wee little croodin' doo", which he would sing to the young Lucy. She recalled later: "The first musical impression that I ever remember came from this song, sung by my father as I sat astride his knee when little more than two years old and in our Tweedale home."

For a number of years, the family maintained a home in London, where the Broadwood piano manufacturing factory was situated. In 1864, however, following the death of Lucy's uncle, Rev. John Broadwood (1798–1864), the family moved to Lyne House, in the parish of Capel in Surrey, just across the county border from the Sussex village of Rusper.

=== Sussex Songs ===
John Broadwood, her uncle, had been responsible in 1847 for self-publishing what is now recognised as the first true collection of English folk songs (comprising both words and music as collected from "rustics" in Surrey and Sussex). Other works had appeared before, but none married actual words and music as collected together. The work, which is more commonly known today by the shortened title Old English Songs, comprised a small number of songs which Broadwood had personally collected and noted down, and which were provided with arrangements by W.A. Dusart, an organist from Worthing, a few years before publication.

Broadwood was inspired by his example when she learnt of it around 1870 (several years after his death). She was aware of Harriet Mason who had published gathered folk songs in 1877. These examples did not lead immediately to emulation; but in 1890 a revised edition of Broadwood's collection was published by Leonard and Co, with new arrangements by Herbert F. Birch Reynardson, Broadwood's cousin, under the title of Sussex Songs. It was produced with her assistance, and also contained an additional sixteen songs that she had collected. (It now appears that at least one of these was collected by her father, Henry Fowler Broadwood.) The publication was sold for 2/6d. It is notable that, although Broadwood had worked on it, her name is not credited in its contents.

=== English County Songs and English Traditional Carols and Songs ===
She was also heavily involved in the early music movement, and in editing Purcell works, and was a member of the Purcell Society. Through this association she became acquainted with, and was also distantly related, by the marriage of one of her cousins, to J.A. Fuller Maitland (1856–1936), a music critic for The Times at that time, and musician. Her friendship and collaboration with him lasted for the rest of her life. As a result of her work on Sussex Songs she was invited to collaborate with him on preparation of what was to become one of a number of influential folksong publications in the late 1880s/early 1890s. This was English County Songs, and this time Broadwood was fully credited as joint editor of the work. The song arrangements were provided by both herself and Fuller Maitland. The book was published to much acclaim in the summer of 1893, and is a milestone in English folksong studies. In the words of Ralph Vaughan Williams: "This may be said to be the starting point of the modern folk song movement". Shortly after the book's publication, her father died and she and her mother moved to a flat in London in 1894. Following her mother's death, Broadwood continued to live in a succession of London flats until her death in 1929.

In 1906, she contributed an appendix entitled "English Airs and Motifs in Jamaica" to the book Jamaican Song and Story by Walter Jekyll. Her other principal publication was English Traditional Carols and Songs which was published in 1908. On this occasion all of the song arrangements were her own, and all of the songs had been collected by her. (In the previous publication, English County Songs the majority of songs were actually gleaned from earlier publications, or had been submitted to the editors by other collectors). An important source was the Horsham shoemaker Henry Burstow, from whom she had collected many songs, the first on 2 May 1892.

=== Folk-Song Society ===
As a result of the success of a number of folksong publications (including English County Songs) in the late 1880s and early 1890s, moves were made to found the Folk-Song Society, and at its inaugural meeting in 1898, Broadwood was elected to the committee, together with Fuller Maitland. Contralto, composer, and festival organizer Mary Augusta Wakefield was another early member. In 1904 she became the Honorary Secretary, following the illness and subsequent death of her predecessor in the post, Kate Lee, and her diary records that she held a meeting with Cecil Sharp and Ralph Vaughan Williams to plan for the resurrection of the Society and "fan its dying embers". Their work was evidently successful as the Society continued in existence until its amalgamation with the English Folk Dance Society in 1932, which gave rise to the English Folk Dance and Song Society, which exists to this day. Broadwood also took on the mantle of Editor of the Folk-Song Journal at this time. Although her Secretaryship of the Society was to last for only a short while, she retained her post as editor of the Journal (with the exception of a very short period of relinquishment) until her resignation from the work in 1926. Her work as Editor, and her research scholarship were recognised internationally, and, in his subsequent obituary of her, Vaughan Williams (amongst others) noted that it was principally her work which had ensured the existence and revival of the Society.

During her song collecting career Broadwood collected songs from many areas – for example, from her home area of Surrey/Sussex; from Hertfordshire (where members of her family lived); from Arisaig in summer 1906 and again in summer 1907, when, inspired by Percy Grainger, she used a phonograph to collect Gaelic songs; from Peebles in 1907; from Lincolnshire (where she collected jointly with Grainger in 1906); and from Devon (where she undertook a collecting trip with Sabine Baring-Gould in 1893).

In 1929 she was elected President of the Society, but was only to hold this position for less than 12 months, as she died unexpectedly and suddenly on 22 August 1929 at the age of 71 in Dropmore, Kent, where she was visiting relatives in order to attend an arts festival in Canterbury.

=== Other activities ===
Broadwood was also a performer who gave many recitals from the concert platform of both classical works, and folksongs; an accomplished accompanist, working with both professional singers and amateurs; and a composer in her own right, having had a number of works published in her early twenties, as well as editing for works by Purcell and translating works by Bach and Schütz. She was a writer of light verse, which she submitted to Punch and The Globe.

== Legacy ==
She was buried in the churchyard at Rusper, and the family commissioned an alabaster plaque from Thomas Clapperton, which is situated on the wall just inside the entrance door of the church. On 1 May each year, the Broadwood Morris men, named after her, dance inside the church, and hang a wreath on the plaque in her honour.

To celebrate the deposit of Lucy Broadwood's diaries in January 2000, archivists at Surrey History Centre prepared an exhibition of her songs, diaries and papers which aimed to reveal some of the many facets of her life and personality in her own words and those of her friends.
