= John Broadwood (song collector) =

English folk song collector (1798–1864)

Rev. John Broadwood (13 May 1798 – 26 January 1864) was the first English folk song collector.

== Life and legacy ==
John Broadwood was born in 1798 in Marylebone, London. He was the son of James Shudi Broadwood and the grandson of John Broadwood, both piano makers in London. When he was young, his family moved to the Broadwood family home: Lyne House in Capel, Surrey. In 1825, he married Charlotte King of Loxwood, Sussex. He was a clergyman, and officiated at a wedding in 1850. The 1851 Census of Horsham identified that Broadwood lived at Wiggonholt, and was described as the "Curate of Wiggonholt". He died at Lyne House in 1864.

Broadwood is known for the book or pamphlet dated 1843, originally published anonymously, usually known as Old English Songs. It contains 16 folk songs, "set to music exactly as they are now sung", and with the words "given in their original rough state with an occasional slight alteration to render the sense intelligible".

His niece, the noted song collector Lucy Broadwood, said that Old English Songs "is the first serious collection of English traditional songs that we possess"; and related that he insisted to George A. Dusart, the Worthing church organist who arranged Old English Songs for publication, that the songs should be set down exactly as he had heard them. According to the composer Ralph Vaughan Williams, Broadwood "is to be honoured in the annals of English folk-song". In 1943, the music critic Frank Howes wrote a scholarly article about him to "celebrate the centenary year of scientific method applied editorially to the oral tradition of English folk-song".

== Old English Songs ==
=== The title page ===
This reads as follows:

Old English Songs. As now Sung by the Peasantry of the Weald of Surrey and Sussex and collected by one who has learnt them by hearing them sung every Christmas from early childhood by The Country People, who go about to the Neighbouring Houses, Singing, or "Wassailing" as it is called, at that Season.
The Airs are set to music exactly as they are now sung, to rescue them from oblivion and to afford a specimen of genuine Old English Melody.
The Words are given in their original Rough State with an occasional slight alteration to render the sense intelligible.
Harmonized for the collector in 1843 by G. A. Dusart, Organist to the Chapel of Ease at Worthing.

=== The songs ===
The 16 songs collected by Broadwood are reproduced in a book which the authors have released online into the public domain under a Creative Commons licence. Alternative titles and (where identified) Roud Folk Song Index numbers and other information are included in parentheses.

1. "The Moon Shines Bright" (702)
2. "A Wassail, A Wassail" (209)
3. "The Noble Lord"
4. "Rosebuds in June" (812)
5. "A Sweet Country Life" (2406)
6. "The Ploughboy" ("The Jolly Ploughboy", "Come All You Jolly Ploughboys") (202)
7. "The Privateer"
8. "The Fourteenth of July" (980)
9. "Gipsy Song"
10. "The Husbandman" (873?)
11. "The Bailiff's Daughter of Islington" (483) (Child Ballad No. 105)
12. "The Poacher's Song" ("Thorny Moor Woods") (222)
13. "In Lancashire"
14. "Come Listen"
15. "The Woodcutter" ("Harvest Supper Song") (310)
16. "Lord Bateman" (40) (Child Ballad No. 53)
