= Beer in Sussex =

Beer in Sussex is beer produced in the historic county of Sussex in England, East Sussex and West Sussex.

== History ==
=== Medieval period ===
Ale was known to have been brewed by monks at the Hallend roundabout Lewes Priory as the water was too contaminated to drink. The Normans introduced cider to Sussex in the 11th century. Nevertheless in the late 14th and early 15th centuries it is recorded that even in regions with a cider drinking history such as Sussex, ale was a more popular drink than cider.

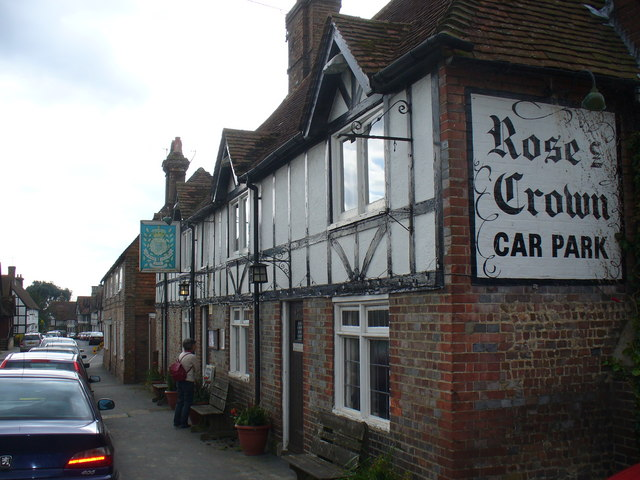
Parts of the Rose & Crown public house at Fletching date from around 1150

From the late 14th century hopped beer was being imported into Winchelsea. The first recorded hopped beer in Sussex and one of the first in England arrived at Winchelsea from the Low Countries in 1400. At this time ale produced in the countryside was typically weak and flat and quickly deteriorated. Adding hops instead of spices produced a drink that would last longer and which was favoured by some drinkers. It is recorded that in 1426-27 beer was being bought for Sir Thomas Etchingham and workers that he employed. Hops were being imported into Sussex and since no manufactured beer was being imported, beer must have been manufactured locally in Sussex, usually by foreign residents. In 1460 hopped beer was being bought in Rye. By the 1490s records from the leet and rape courts show hopped beer was being sold at Brede (at the time near the coast), Alfriston (on the South Downs) and at Laughton and Waldron in the Weald. By 1500 "beer was being sold almost everywhere" in the county. This was due to Sussex's ties with the Low Countries; in many English villages outside Sussex no hopped beer was sold well into the 16th century and later. Henry Stanton was accused in Crawley in 1602 of stealing nutmeg and cinnamon, the spices are likely to have been to flavour hopped beer rather than unhopped ale.

Sussex's oldest public houses date from the medieval period including the Rose & Crown at Fletching (c 1150, mostly rebuilt 17th century), the Mermaid Inn at Rye (1156, rebuilt 1420), the George & Dragon at Houghton (1276), the Olde Bell at Rye (1390), the George at Alfriston (first licensed 1397), the Blackboys Inn at Blackboys in the parish of Framfield (14th century), the Seven Stars, Robertsbridge (14th century), the Spread Eagle, Midhurst (c1435), the Star (originally the Star of Bethlehem, Alfriston, c. 1450).

=== Tudor period (1485–1603) ===
In 1524 a licence was granted for Edward Guildford to export hops from Rye and Winchelsea. The earliest oast houses date from 1585 in Rye and Salehurst in 1597. Many Sussex brewers at this time were from the Low Countries. Cornelis Roetmans from Flanders was a brewer in Playden until his death in 1530. Dirick Carver, also from Flanders, was a brewer at the Black Lion in Brighton. Carver was burnt at the stake at Lewes during the reign of Mary I in 1555.

There is a legend of the Brede Giant, who devoured a child every night for supper. According to the story, local children made a vat of beer for the giant to drink. Whilst in a drunken state the giant was sawn in two at Groaning Bridge by some children from the east of the county on one side of the saw and some from the west on the other side. The story is said to have been based on Goddard Oxenbridge, a Catholic former sheriff of Sussex, perhaps at a time when many people were suspicious of Catholics. Local smugglers may have encouraged the stories to keep people away from Oxenbridge's landholdings so that they could be used for contraband.

=== Stuart era (1603–1700) ===
From the 1620s and 1630s, Sabbatarianism gained ground across parts of Sussex. During Cromwell's interregnum, Rye stood out as a Puritan 'Common Wealth', a centre of social experiment and rigorous public morality. The people of Rye seem in general to have ignored the strict sabbatarianism enforced by the constables, particularly where 'immoderate drinking' was concerned.

=== 18th century ===
One notable brew from the 18th century is a strong beer from Newhaven brewer Thomas Tipper known as Old Stingo which English king George IV was known to enjoy. Old Stingo is also mentioned in Charles Dickens' Martin Chuzzlewit in which Mrs Gamp is known to partake in the celebrated staggering ale of Brighton Stingo.

Harveys Brewery was founded in 1790 in Lewes and is the oldest brewery in Sussex. The beer cocktail named huckle-my-buff that was created in Sussex and is sometimes considered to have been the world's first cocktail. Huckle-my-buff is a hot drink consisting of brandy, eggs, beer, sugar and nutmeg. It was originally made with smuggled French brandy and Harveys porter beer.

=== 19th century ===
Using the slogan 'beef, beer and bacca', the Skeleton Army riots against the temperance message of Salvation Army across the county resulted in disturbances at several places and the Riot Act having to be read at Worthing. By the late 19th century people in Sussex each drank an average amount of 34 imperial gallons (150 litres) of beer per year.

Various customs and drinking songs in Sussex were associated with the drinking of beer. During harvest time there was a custom that each of around 20-30 men at a table would drink a glass of beer placed on top of a tall hat and when finished had to catch the glass inside the hat. They would then need to repeat the exercise with more drinks until completing the task while the group sung Turn The Cup Over, a song which begins "I've been to London, I've been to Dover...". Belloc himself writing two drinking songs relating to the drinking of beer in Sussex: the Sussex Drinking Song and the West Sussex Drinking Song, which was included in Belloc's novel, The Four Men: a Farrago. Sung at the annual dinner of the now-defunct Men of Sussex Society, The Song o' the Sussex Men, written in Sussex dialect by Arthur Beckett, celebrates Tom Tipper a brewer from Newhaven alongside other important characters associated with Sussex including St Wilfrid, St Cuthman, St Dunstan, John Dudeney, Tom Paine, Percy Bysshe Shelley, Richard Cobden and the Devil.

=== 20th century ===
Published in 1911, The Four Men: a Farrago is Hilaire Belloc's novel in which the four characters walk 90 miles across Sussex visiting several pubs and celebrating Sussex beer. Belloc's characters largely live on a diet of cheese, bacon and Sussex beer and Belloc refers to their 'baptism by beer'.

The Arundel Brewery was founded in 1992 and the Dark Star Brewery founded at the Evening Star pub in Brighton in 1994.

=== 21st century ===
The King and Barnes brewery at Horsham was taken over in 2000 by Dorset-based Hall and Woodhouse who closed and demolished the brewery building. After the closure head brewer Andy Hepworth was determined to keep the maintain the tradition of brewing in this part of Sussex by starting his own brewery, Hepworth in 2001. The take-over and closure of King and Barnes left a gap in the Sussex market which was a factor in the expansion of the Dark Star brewery. The 2002 change to beer taxation implemented by Gordon Brown, known as Progressive Beer Duty, halved the amount of duty for small brewers and helped Sussex's small brewers to expand.

In February 2001, Ray Welton moved his brewery (Weltons Brewery) into Horsham. Ray had been brewing since 1995 and was taught commercial brewing by Fred Martin the retired head brewer of King & Barnes. Fred handed on the Old Ale recipe which Weltons have been brewing since 2001 and continue to brew to this day.

In December 2006 Harvey's popular best bitter Harveys Best was removed from sale from the Lewes Arms in Lewes; a 133-day boycott of the Lewes Arms by the people of Lewes ensued until Harveys Best was reinstated. A rebranding in 2016 saw Harveys include the strapline We wunt be druv, the unofficial motto of the county of Sussex. This comes as part of a planned expansion beyond its traditional reach of 60 miles (97 km) miles from its brewery at Lewes.

Sussex's first micropub, Anchored in Worthing, opened in 2013 in Worthing

Notable breweries in Sussex include 360 Degree Brewing Company, Abyss Brewing, Arundel Brewery, Beak Brewery, Burning Sky Brewery, Firebird Brewing Company, Gun Brewery, Harveys of Lewes, Long Man Brewery, Missing Link Brewing, Only With Love, Three Ache Brewery and UnBarred Brewery.

== Styles ==
A range of diverse styles of beer is produced in Sussex. Historically well-hopped, Sussex beers were traditionally slightly sweeter than beers from neighbouring Kent.

=== Bitter ===
Nutty and bitter, Harveys's Sussex Best Bitter has won the 2005 and 2006 awards for the champion best bitter at the CAMRA beer festival and has been called one of the best traditional British beers.

Hepworth's Sussex Pale Bitter has been described as one of England's best organic beers.

Long Man Brewery's Best Bitter has won numerous awards, such as being named the world's best bitter under 4.5% at the 2023 World Beer Awards.

=== Old ale ===
Several Sussex breweries produce a weaker style of old ale with some resemblance to a mild ale. (Note: The boundary between old ale and mild is blurry, simply because, historically, old ale was mild ale, but aged.) Examples include King and Barnes (later W. J King) (4.5% ABV), Weltons Beers (4.5% ABV) (primed with molasses) and Harveys (4.3% ABV) These are typically consumed on draught dispense. Hepworth encourages consumers to 'gently mull' its dark Classic Old Ale which it describes as a "traditional style of winter beer"

=== Sour beers ===
Monolith from Burning Sky has been described as one of the UK's best sour beers.

== Ingredients ==
=== Hops ===
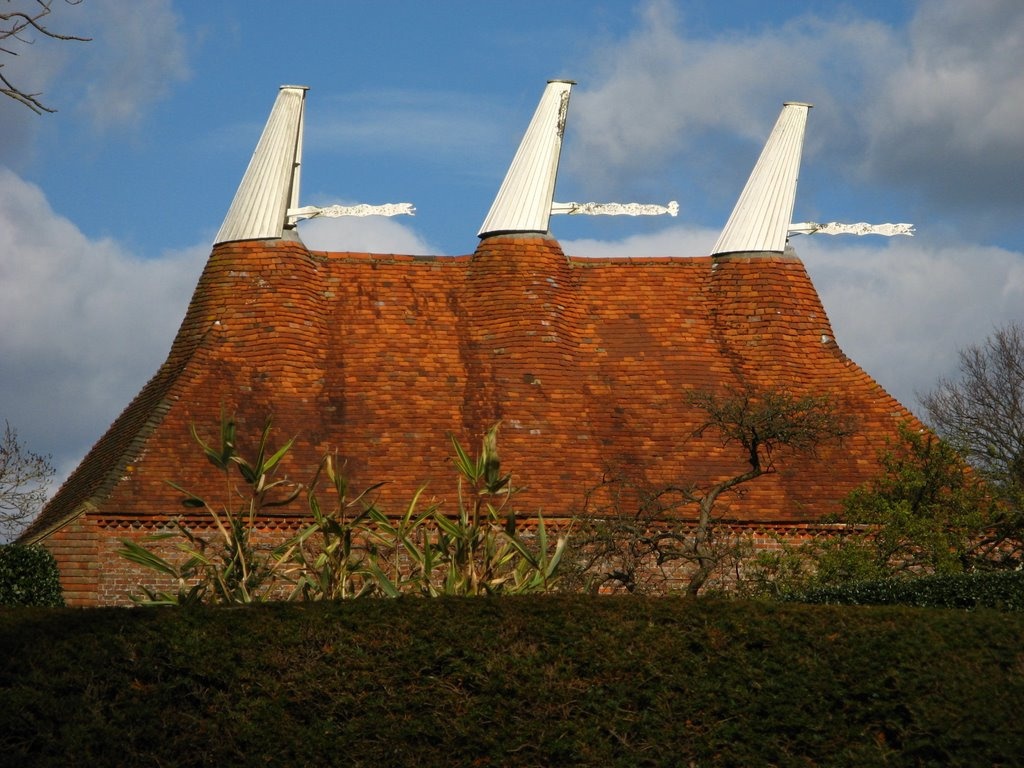
Oast house for drying hops at Great Dixter, Northiam

The dried flowers of hop plants are used to give beer its distinctive taste. Hops have been grown in Sussex since the 16th century. Hops continue to be grown in Sussex, mostly in the north-east of the county to the north of Hastings. Bramling Cros hops and challenger hops are grown in Sussex. A type of wild hop discovered in a hedgerow at Northiam in 2005 is now called the Sussex Hop which has earthy, grassy minty aromas.

=== Malt ===
Malt was historically produced from barley often grown in Sussex especially on the South Downs. Brewing malt is currently produced at Goodwood.

=== Water ===
Various Sussex breweries use their own springs to produce beer including Harveys of Lewes and Gun Brewery of Gun Hill.

== Breweries in Sussex ==
=== Current breweries ===
- Abyss Brewing - Lewes, East Sussex
- Arundel Brewery - Arundel, West Sussex
- Beak Brewery - Lewes, East Sussex
- Burning Sky Brewery - Firle, East Sussex
- Firebird Brewing Company - Rudgwick, West Sussex
- Gun Brewery - Uckfield, East Sussex
- Harvey's Brewery - Lewes, East Sussex
- Lakedown Brewing Co. - Burwash, East Sussex
- Long Man Brewery - Litlington, East Sussex
- Missing Link Brewing - East Grinstead, East Sussex
- Only With Love - Uckfield, East Sussex
- Three Ache Brewery - Uckfield, East Sussex
- UnBarred Brewery - Brighton, East Sussex

=== Former breweries ===
- 360 Degree Brewing Company - Uckfield, East Sussex
- Bestens Brewery - Burgess Hill, West Sussex
- Dark Star Brewery - Horsham, West Sussex

== See also ==
- Culture of Sussex
- Sussex wine
- Beer in England
- Beer in the United Kingdom

== Bibliography ==
- Arscott, David (2007). Dead and Buried in Sussex: Incorporating What the Vicar Saw. Pomegranate Press. ISBN 9780954897550.
- Bickerdyke, John (2017). The Curiosities of Ale and Beer - An Entertaining History. Read Books. ISBN 9781473339132.
- Bennett, Judith M. (1996). Ale, Beer and Brewsters in England: Women's Work in a Changing World, 1300-1600. Oxford: Oxford University Press. ISBN 9780195126501.
- Brabant (2011). The Oxford Companion to Beer. Oxford: Oxford University Press. ISBN 978-0199912100.
- Brandon, Peter (2010). The Discovery of Sussex. Phillimore & Co Ltd. ISBN 978-1-86077-616-8.
- Carlin, Martha; Rosenthal, Joel T. (1998). Food and Eating in Medieval Europe. A&C Black. ISBN 9781852851484.
- Hornsey, Ian S (2007). A History of Beer and Brewing. Royal Society of Chemistry. ISBN 9781847550026.
- Lowerson, John (1980). A Short History of Sussex. Folkestone, Kent: Dawson. ISBN 9780712909488.
- Mate, Mavis E. (1998). Daughters, Wives, and Widows After the Black Death: Women in Sussex, 1350-1535. Boydell & Brewer Ltd. ISBN 978-0851155340.
- Muggleton, David (2017). Brewing in West Sussex. Amberley Publishing Ltd. ISBN 9781445657264.
- Newman, Kevin (2017). 50 Gems of Sussex. Amberley Publishing Ltd. ISBN 9781445666143.
- Oliver, Garrett, ed. (2011). The Oxford Companion to Beer. Oxford: Oxford University Press. ISBN 978-0199912100.
- Phillips, A.D.M.; Smith, C.B. (2014). The South East from 1000 AD. Routledge. ISBN 978-1317871705.
- Simpson, Jacqueline (2009). Folklore of Sussex. Folklore of Series. History Press Limited. ISBN 9780752451008.
