= Sussex by the Sea =

1907 song by William Ward-Higgs

"Sussex by the Sea" (also known as "A Horse Galloping") is a song written in 1907 by William Ward-Higgs, often considered to be the unofficial county anthem of Sussex. It became well known throughout Sussex and is regularly sung at celebrations throughout the county. It can be heard during many sporting events in the county, during the Sussex bonfire celebrations and it is played by marching bands and Morris dancers across Sussex. It is the adopted song of Brighton & Hove Albion Football Club, Sussex Division Royal Naval Reserve (now closed), Sussex Association of Naval Officers and Sussex County Cricket Club.

== History ==
The song became popular during the First World War, having already been adopted by the Royal Sussex Regiment as an unofficial "nick" march. William Ward-Higgs, a native of Lancashire, lived at Hollywood House in South Bersted for only five or six years. One version of the tune's origins is that Ward-Higgs grew to love his adopted county so much he produced a marching song in its praise. In another version Ward-Higgs composed the song specifically for the wedding of his sister-in-law Gladys when she became engaged to Captain Roland Waithman of the 2nd Battalion of the Royal Sussex Regiment. It may well have come from a poem written by Rudyard Kipling in 1902 entitled Sussex, the final stanza of which is:

God gives all men all earth to love,
But since man's heart is small,
Ordains for each one spot shall prove
Beloved over all.
Each to his choice, and I rejoice
The lot has fallen to me
In a fair ground – in a fair ground –
Yea, Sussex by the Sea!

The song was published in 1907, and Captain Waithman performed it in concerts at Ballykinlar Camp in Ireland where the battalion was then stationed. The song never became the regimental march: this was always "The Royal Sussex". It was, however, the first march used by the Royal Air Force, as their Officers Training School No. 1 was in a hotel in St Leonards-on-Sea. During the re-colonisation/liberation of Singapore at the end of World War II in 1945, the Royal Marine band of the heavy cruiser HMS Sussex played "Sussex by the Sea" as the ship entered harbour.

Enthusiasm for "Sussex by the Sea" goes far beyond Sussex. King Hussein of Jordan would insist the tune be played whenever he visited the military academy at Sandhurst. The march continues to be played at band concerts all over the world and, despite the Royal Sussex Regiment's amalgamation into the Queen's Regiment and later the Princess of Wales's Royal Regiment, it is still played on ceremonial occasions.

"Sussex By The Sea" is the regimental march of the 25th Battalion, Royal Queensland Regiment, and the 16th Battalion, Royal Western Australia Regiment, Australia.

=== Lyrics ===
First Verse
Now is the time for marching,
Now let your hearts be gay,
Hark to the merry bugles
Sounding along our way.
So let your voices ring, my boys,
And take the time from me,
And I’ll sing you a song as we march along,
Of Sussex by the Sea!

Chorus
For we're the men from Sussex, Sussex by the Sea.
We plough and sow and reap and mow,
And useful men are we;
And when you go to Sussex, whoever you may be,
You may tell them all that we stand or fall
For Sussex by the Sea!

Refrain
Oh Sussex, Sussex by the Sea!
Good old Sussex by the Sea!
You may tell them all we stand or fall,
For Sussex by the Sea.

Second Verse
Up in the morning early,
Start at the break of day;
March till the evening shadows
Tell us it's time to stay.
We're always moving on, my boys,
So take the time from me,
And sing this song as we march along,
Of Sussex by the Sea.

Chorus and Refrain

Third Verse
Sometimes your feet are weary,
Sometimes the way is long,
Sometimes the day is dreary,
Sometimes the world goes wrong;
But if you let your voices ring,
Your care will fly away,
So we'll sing a song as we march along,
Of Sussex by the Sea.

Chorus and Refrain

Fourth Verse
Light is the love of a soldier,
That's what the ladies say –
Lightly he goes a wooing,
Lightly he rides away.
In love and war we always are
As fair as fair can be,
And a soldier boy is the ladies' joy
In Sussex by the Sea.

Chorus and Refrain

Fifth Verse
Far o'er the seas we wander,
Wide thro’ the world we roam;
Far from the kind hearts yonder,
Far from our dear old home;
But ne'er shall we forget, my boys,
And true we'll ever be
To the girls so kind that we left behind
In Sussex by the Sea.

Chorus and Refrain

== Alternative lyrics ==
=== Sussex County Cricket Club ===
In 1957, Joe Haddon wrote a two verse version dedicated to Sussex cricket.

Now is the time for playing
Now let your hearts be gay
List what your captain is saying
While off the field of play
So put your best leg forward, my lads
And time each ball you see
If you sing the old song
Well you can't go wrong
Of Sussex By The Sea

Chorus:

Good Old Sussex by the Sea, Good Old Sussex By the Sea
You can tell them all that we stand or fall
For Sussex by the Sea.

Good Old Sussex By the Sea
Their cricket is a pleasure to see
They will give you a show
For they don't play slow
And useful men are they
So when you go to Sussex
Six Martlets men to see
They will delight you all
With the bat and the ball
In the County Ground by the Sea.

=== Brighton & Hove Albion F.C. & Sussex County Cricket Club ===
In more recent years, the song has been taken up by both Brighton & Hove Albion F.C. and Sussex County Cricket Club. It is the clubs' official song, but sometimes with a changed chorus (often sung on its own, without any verses) - or, more recently, just humming the verses. The song was often simplified to:

Good old Sussex by the sea,
Good old Sussex by the sea

Oh we're going up
To win the cup

For Sussex by the sea.

Since 2011 when the football club moved to Falmer Stadium, a loud, rousing version by the Grenadier Guards has been used as the teams enter the field of play, with the original lyrics of the first verse and refrain appearing on the big screen.

Prior to a league match against Middlesbrough F.C. in December 2014 (during a particularly poor season for the team) a technical fault resulted in the music cutting out for the chorus, but this had the positive effect of the home crowd picking up the song at this point and singing it with far more gusto than previously. As a result, the music has been intentionally cut ever since for the last three lines, which are sung by the crowd alone followed by applause:

... Good Old Sussex By the Sea

You can tell them all that we stand or fall

For Sussex by the Sea.

=== Christ's Hospital ===
Christ's Hospital uses the tune as its school march.

=== 1939 Sussex People's March of History ===
Marching through Eastbourne in the 'Sussex People's March of History' of 1939 with banners that included Jack Cade's rebellion in 1450, the Swing Riots of 1830 and the Battle of Lewes Road, which was a significant incident in Brighton in the General Strike of 1926, 400 protesters led by Ernie Trory of the Sussex Communist movement sang the following words to Sussex by the Sea.

Now is the time for marching
Under our banners red
Rank upon rank advancing
Surely we forge ahead
So let your voices ring comrades,
All you who would be free
And we'll sing a song
As we march along
Of peace and liberty

== See also ==
- Eastbourne Redoubt – Home of the Royal Sussex Regimental Museum
- Music of Sussex
- We wunt be druv – unofficial Sussex county motto
