= The Four Men: A Farrago =

1911 novel by Hilaire Belloc

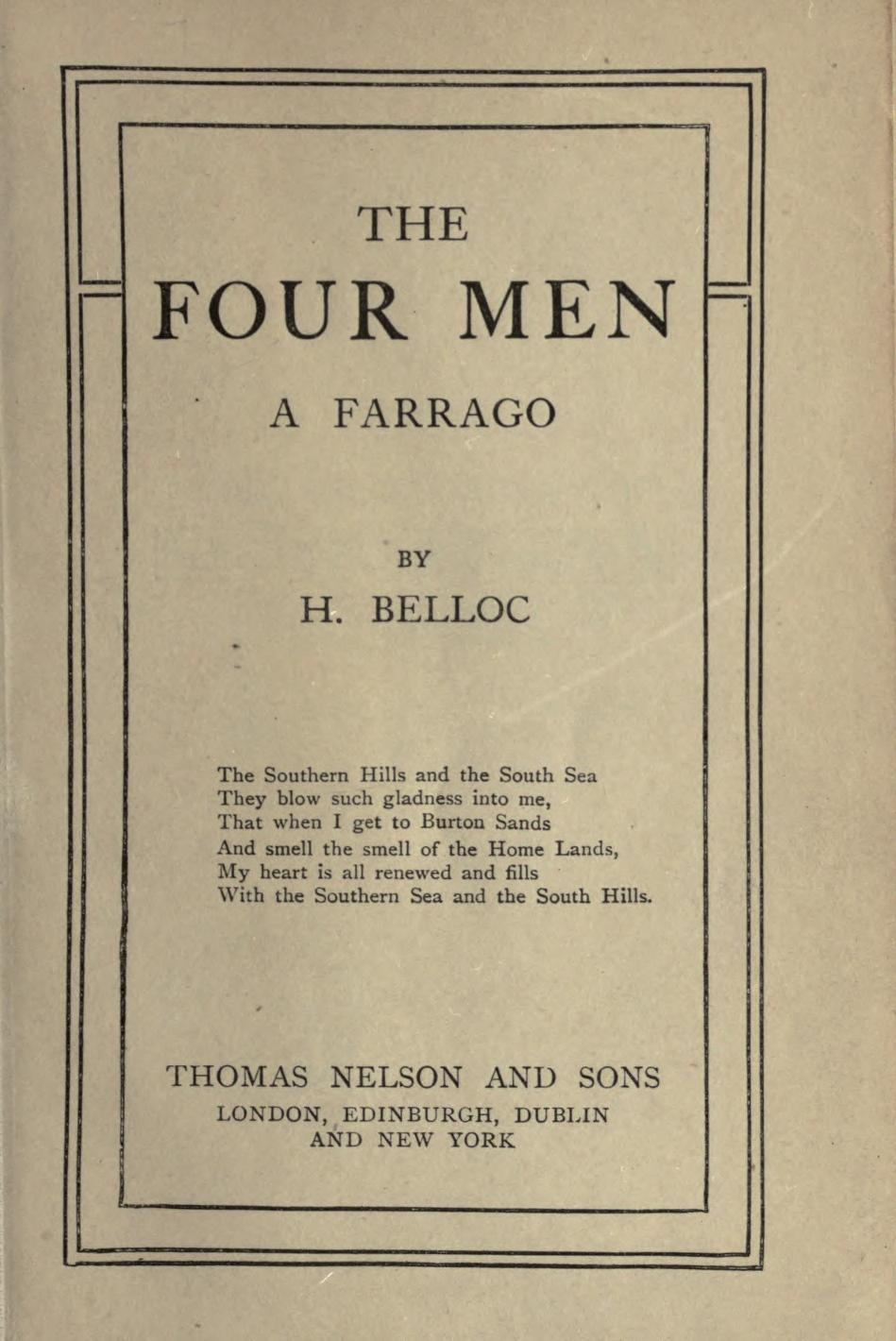
- Author: Hilaire Belloc
- Language: English
- Publisher: T. Nelson & Sons
- Publication date: 1911
- Publication place: United Kingdom
- Media type: Print

The Four Men: A Farrago is a 1911 novel by Hilaire Belloc that describes a 140-kilometre (90 mi) long journey on foot across the English county of Sussex from Robertsbridge in the east to Harting in the west. As a "secular pilgrimage" through Sussex, the book has parallels with his earlier work, the religious pilgrimage of his autobiographical The Path to Rome (1902). "The Four Men" describes four characters, Myself, Grizzlebeard, the Poet and the Sailor, each aspects of Belloc's personality, as they journey in a half-real, half-fictional allegory of life. Subtitled "a Farrago", meaning a 'confused mixture', the book contains a range of anecdotes, songs, reflections and miscellany. The book is also Belloc's homage to "this Eden which is Sussex still" and conveys Belloc's "love for the soil of his native land" of Sussex.

Beginning on 29 October 1902, the characters set out from The George Inn at Robertsbridge, where Belloc was a regular customer. From Robertsbridge the characters walk via various public houses, through Heathfield, Uckfield, Ardingly, Ashurst and Amberley to South Harting. The story takes place over five continuous days from 29 October 1902, to 2 November. In the Western Christian calendar the period culminates in Hallowe'en or All Hallow's Eve (31 October), All Saints Day or All Hallow's Day (1 November) and All Souls Day (2 November).

The book contains various poetry and songs, including the West Sussex Drinking Song. Belloc was also a lover of Sussex songs and wrote lyrics. Joseph Pearce argues that Belloc "knew every inch of the way" and "had evidently walked most of the route at various times, even if he had never walked the whole route at one time."

Belloc envisaged calling the book "The County of Sussex". In 1909 Belloc told Maurice Baring that the three characters other than 'Myself' are really supernatural beings, a poet, a sailor and Grizzlebeard himself: they only turn out to be supernatural beings when they get to the village of Liss, which is just over the Hampshire border.

== Content ==
Each day in The Four Men is included in a separate chapter.

=== Day 1–29 October 1902 ===
Robertsbridge

=== Day 2–30 October 1902 ===
Robertsbridge to Ardingly via Brightling, Heathfield, Uckfield and Fletching.

=== Day 3–31 October 1902 ===
Ardingly to Ashurst via St Leonard's Forest, Lower Beeding, Cowfold and Henfield

=== Day 4–1 November 1902 ===
Ashurst to somewhere west of Sutton via Steyning, Washington, Storrington, Amberley, Houghton, Bignor and Sutton.

=== Day 5–2 November 1902 ===
West of Sutton to Harting via Treyford

== Reception ==
A review written by Robert C. Holliday in the New York Times in 1913 is positive calling the book "an enchanting volume. C. Creighton Mandell and Edward Shanks have described the work as "grave and deep, informed with emotion". G. K. Chesterton wrote that "there are few speeches in modern books better than the conversations in The Four Men." Tim Rich argued that Belloc is overly negative about the future of Sussex, saying that Belloc projects his own pessimism onto the land, rather than celebrating its potential. Writing in 2010, cultural historian Peter Brandon calls The Four Men "the most passionate and original book on Sussex ever written".

== Themes ==
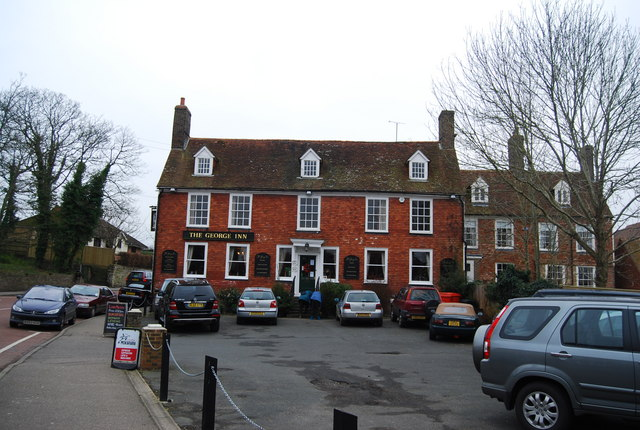
The George Inn, Robertsbridge in December 2008, where the four men begin their walk across Sussex

Belloc wrote The Four Men at a time of great social change in Sussex, when ways of life that had held constant for centuries were being replaced and the individuality of 'Old Sussex' was being replaced with a country-wide uniformity. Belloc addresses the start of the book to Sussex directly, as if it were a person, "who must like all created things decay". Predicting that Sussex was destined to lose its historic character, Belloc set down what he saw before it was forgotten and became a different thing "its people never more being what they were".

The late 19th and early 20th centuries saw a sudden loss of Sussex's distinctive speech patterns, folklore and customs, in large part due to the arrival of urban newcomers with little knowledge or sympathy for these traditions. Belloc condemned ignorant urban newcomers who pronounced the market town near his home "Hor-sham" instead of what had been known for centuries as "Hors-ham".

Belloc compared "this Eden which is Sussex still" with the "slavery being undergone by people in the industrial districts". He saw London and capitalist society reaching into Sussex and he condemned what he saw as towns "of the London sort" such as Haywards Heath and Burgess Hill, where "the more one worked, the less one had, and if one did not work at all, one died"; Belloc's characters go out of their way to avoid these towns. Concerned about the impact of capitalism on society, Belloc went on to publish in the following year The Servile State (1912) in which he used his experience of living with small peasant farmers in the Sussex Weald to advocate his thesis of having a property-owning democracy based on peasant smallholdings that would bring together the different social classes, which would later flourish into distributism along with his own later works and the works of G.K. Chesterton.

Behind a boisterous and whimsical surface, other key themes include home, companionship, the transience of life and the presence of decay.

== Legacy and homage ==
=== Literature ===
The work has influenced others including Sussex folk musician Bob Copper, who retraced Belloc's steps in the 1980s and published his work as "Across Sussex with Belloc". Belloc's route was walked in reverse, from west to east in the 2010s, by the Rev Nick Flint, rector of Rusper and Colgate in Cautionary Pilgrim: Walking Backwards with Belloc (2014). Flint also writes his book about a journey of four men, each representing parts of Flint's own character, in a style reminiscent of Belloc. One of the characters is a priest or minister figure. Others to have walked and written about Belloc's route include journalist Nick Channer.

The Four Men is thought to have heavily influenced Rupert Brooke's well-known poem "The Soldier".

=== Adaptations ===
The Four Men has also been made into a play, including as the Festival Play for the 1951 Festival of Sussex and for the 2010 Brighton Fringe.

=== Music ===
The Four Men includes lyrics for the West Sussex Drinking Song, which was put to music in 1921 by Ivor Gurney.

== See also ==
- 1911 in literature
- Culture of Sussex
- Drinking song
- Hilaire Belloc and G. K. Chesterton
- South Downs Way
- Sussex Border Path
