= We wunt be druv =

Unofficial county motto of Sussex, England

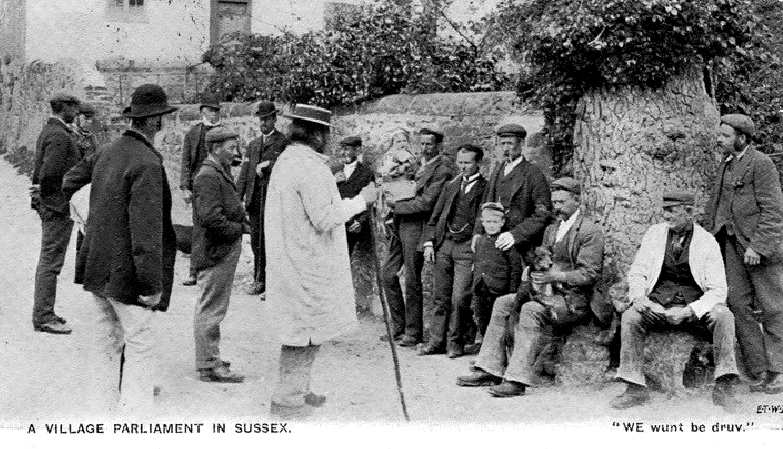
Village parliament. Postcard posted 1904

"We wunt be druv" is the unofficial county motto of Sussex in southern England. It is a Sussex dialect phrase meaning "we will not be driven". The motto asserts that people from the English county of Sussex have minds of their own, and cannot be forced against their will or told what to do. It is used as a motto of the people of Sussex and the Sussex Bonfire Societies.

== Origins ==
According to the Oxford Dictionary of Proverbs, "Sussex won't be druv" is a local proverbial saying dating from the early 20th century. In 1875 the Dictionary of the Sussex Dialect stated "I wunt be druv" as a "favourite maxim with Sussex people". Although used all over Sussex, the phrase probably originates from the Weald, and there is evidence that in Wealden areas common people were freer from manorial control than in the rest of Sussex. Twice in the late Middle Ages Wealden peasants rose in revolt: once in the Peasants' Revolt of 1381, under the leadership of Wat Tyler and the radical priest John Ball, and again in the 1450 rebellion led by Jack Cade, who was pursued and fatally wounded at Old Heathfield, where he had connections. The phrase "I wunt be druv" is mentioned in E. V. Lucas's 1904 book Highways and Byways in Sussex (1904).

== Usage ==
In his 1924 tale The Cricket Match, Hugh de Sélincourt wrote: "'Well, we'd better be going, I suppose,' Gauvinier announced – well aware that 'Sussex won't be druv'." In David Frome's Mr. Pinkerton at the Old Angel, "The sudden weariness in her frail face testified to years of patient leading. Mr. Pinkerton thought of the boast of the men of Sussex. They too couldn't be druv, they said."

According to linguist Richard Coates, an organisation called The Men of Sussex had as its motto Non cogemur, a Latin translation of the motto.

The phrase was also used in poetry: (Note: Coates provides a list of authors who used the saying. He suggests that a fuller version was in "In praise of Sussex : an anthology for friends" by Neville Hilditch, published in 1950 and the most explicit version was quoted by J. Mainwaring Baines in 1980 in "Sussex pottery")

You may push and you may shov
But I'm hemmed if I'll be druv

And a longer version:

And you may pook
And you may shove
But a Sussex pig
He wunt be druv

In Sussex, pigs are respected for their independent spirit and are associated with the motto. In the 19th century, some Sussex potteries produced earthenware flasks in the shape of pigs with "wunt be druv" incised or impressed on the pig's neck.

W Victor Cook wrote a poem in Sussex dialect, published in 1914:

Sussex Won't be Druv
Some folks as come to Sussex,
They reckons as they know –
A durn sight better what to do
Than simple folks, like me and you,
Could possibly suppose.

But them as comes to Sussex,
They mustn't push and shove,
For Sussex will be Sussex,
And Sussex won't be druv!

Mus Wilfred come to Sussex,
Us heaved a stone at he,
Because he reckoned he could teach
Our Sussex fishers how to reach
The fishes in the sea.

But when he dwelt among us,
Us gave un land and luv,
For Sussex will be Sussex,
And Sussex won't be druv!

All folks as come to Sussex
Must follow Sussex ways –
And when they've larned to know us well,
There's no place else they'll wish to dwell
In all their blessed days –

There ant no place like Sussex,
Until ye goos above,
For Sussex will be Sussex,
And Sussex won't be druv.
W Victor Cook 1914

== See also ==
- "Sussex by the Sea" – unofficial Sussex county anthem
