= William Ward-Higgs =

English lawyer and songwriter (1866–1936)

William Ward-Higgs (3 January 1866 – 21 June 1936) was an English lawyer and songwriter who wrote "Sussex by the Sea": The unofficial anthem of that county, a regimental march of the Royal Sussex Regiment, and the official song of Brighton & Hove Albion F.C.

He was born on 3 January 1866 at Whitmore, Talbot Road, in Southport. For much of his life, he worked in London as a solicitor. From 1902–08, he lived at Hollywood House in Bersted, West Sussex. He wrote "Sussex by the Sea" when his favourite sister-in-law became engaged to Captain Waithman of the 2nd Battalion, Royal Sussex Regiment. He may have been inspired by Rudyard Kipling's poem Sussex, which ends with the line "Yea, Sussex by the sea!" – he had previously set to music several of Kipling's Barrack-Room Ballads. The song was published in 1907. Subsequently, he moved back to London. He had epilepsy in his later years, and killed himself on 21 June 1936 (aged 70) at his home in Roehampton. He is buried in Bersted churchyard.
