= Weltons Brewery =

British brewery

Ray Welton of Weltons Brewery

Welton's Brewery was an independent brewery founded by Ray Welton in 1995 in Capel, Surrey, England, before it was moved to Dorking. From 2003 until its closure in Spring 2021 Welton brewed in Horsham, West Sussex.

On average, Welton's brewed in excess of 40 different beers every year as well as the seven core beers range and the Horsham Old. Ranging from low abv's to high abv porters. Nothing is rebadged.

== History ==
Using the money he made from selling his drinks distribution business to Beer Seller, Ray Welton built Welton's Brewery using equipment he found in a field. The tax situation in the 1990s in Britain was not helpful to small brewers and eventually he had to brew on Arundel's equipment in order to save costs. When Andy Hepworth started up the Beer Station, Welton was able to move his own equipment and yeast onto the site and that was, for two years, a shared operation. But in August 2003, a year after the sliding scale for brewers was introduced, Welton set up independently. He is still using the equipment he built himself, though, like Fuller's Brewery, he is now using a bottom fermenting ale yeast which he feels gives him more beer per fermentation as a result of less foam in the tank.

Since April 2017, Welton's have held a brewery tap night, on the first Friday of every month where new monthly specials can be tried.

== Beers ==
Welton's produced a wide range of cask ales, which were distributed in the Horsham area and nationally through Wetherspoons and freehouses across the South East. Also distributed in bottles throughout Sussex by Hartleys Wines.

In 1998 Ray (an avid rugby player) decided he wanted to brew a beer he could drink all night after playing, without becoming too inebriated. Pridenjoy 2.8% ABV was brewed and was included by Roger Protz and described in his book "300 Beers To Try Before You Die" 2005, “as a most remarkable beer, a beer that is 2.8% but tastes like 4%”.

In 2001, Fred Martin the retired head brewer of King & Barnes, handed on the Old Ale recipe (Horsham Old 4.5% ABV) which Weltons have been brewing since 2001 and continue to brew to this day.

In 2016 Ray brewed two beers and aged them in Tomintoul malt whisky casks (aged 12 months). A rye beer Dr French's Whisky Rye 8.3% ABV & a porter Dr French's Old Remedy 8.3% ABV.
