= Symbols of Sussex =

Symbols of Sussex are the objects, images or cultural expressions that are emblematic, representative or otherwise characteristic of Sussex or Sussex culture. As a rule, these symbols are cultural icons that have emerged from Sussex folklore and tradition, meaning few have any official status. However, most if not all maintain recognition at a county or national level, and some, such as the emblem of Sussex, have been codified in heraldry, and are established, official and recognised symbols of Sussex.

== Flags ==
Symbol	Image	Description
Flag of Sussex		The flag of Sussex, sometimes known as St. Richard's Flag, has been Sussex's county flag since it was registered with the Flag Institute on 20 May 2011. A banner of arms, the flag is based on the traditional emblem of Sussex.
Cross of Saint Richard of Chichester		The flag of St. Richard of Chichester, the patron saint of Sussex, is sometimes used as an alternative to the Sussex flag, and is flown on Sussex Day

== Heraldry ==
Symbol	Image	Description
Emblem of Sussex		The emblem of Sussex is a heraldic shield symbolising Sussex. The emblem consists of six gold martlets, on a blue field, blazoned as azure, six martlets, three, two and one, or. The first known recording of this emblem being used to represent the county was in 1611 when cartographer John Speed deployed it to represent the Kingdom of the South Saxons. However it seems that Speed was repeating an earlier association between the emblem and the county, rather than being the inventor of the association. It is now firmly regarded that the county emblem originated and derived from the coat of arms of the 14th century Knight of the Shire, Sir John de Radynden. Sussex’s six martlets are today held to symbolise the traditional six sub-divisions of the county known as rapes. The emblem of Sussex continues to represent Sussex and forms the basis of the coats of arms of East and West Sussex County Councils and the badges of several organisations such as Sussex County Cricket Club, Sussex County Football League and Sussex Police.

== Flora ==
Symbol	Image	Description
Round-headed Rampion	align="center"	Known locally as the 'Pride of Sussex', the round-headed rampion (Phyteuma orbiculare) is the county flower of Sussex. The plant is more common on the South Downs than anywhere else in the United Kingdom.
Pedunculate oak (Quercus robur)		Also known as Sussex weed, the pedunculate oak (Quercus robur) is strongly associated with Sussex. Sussex oak was thought to be the best timber for shipbuilding, being unmatched in durability and strength – qualities drawn from the ferruginous soil on which it grew.

== Other symbols ==
Symbol	Image	Description
Sussex by the Sea	-	"Sussex by the Sea" is the unofficial county anthem of Sussex. Adopted by the Royal Sussex Regiment and popularised in World War I, it is sung at celebrations across the county, including those at Lewes Bonfire, and at sports matches, including those of Sussex County Cricket Club and Brighton and Hove Albion Football Club.
We wunt be druv	-	We wunt be druv is the unofficial motto of Sussex. It is also used by some of the Sussex Bonfire Societies.
Saint Richard of Chichester		Saint Richard of Chichester is the patron saint of Sussex. Since 2007, the translated feast day of St Richard, 16 June, has been celebrated as Sussex Day.
Arms of St Richard		The insignia and shield of a male figure holding a sword across his mouth has represented the diocese of Chichester since the 13th century. The imagery is parallel to that seen in an early 14th-century manuscript of the Apocalypse of St John. This illustrates several passages with a figure who variously has a sword across his mouth, holds an open book, and is seated on a throne.
Stoolball		The sport of stoolball is strongly associated with Sussex; it has been referred to as Sussex's 'national' sport and a Sussex game or pastime. The sport's modern rules were codified at Glynde in 1881. Modern stoolball is centred on Sussex where the game was revived in the early 20th century by Major William Grantham.
Sussex Pond Pudding		Sussex Pond Pudding is a traditional pudding believed to have originated in Sussex and first recorded in the 17th century.
Sussex trug		The Sussex trug is a type of wooden basket that is associated with Sussex, dating back to the 1500s and gaining renown at the Great Exhibition of 1851.

== See also ==
- Cornish symbols
- Symbols of England
- Symbols of the United Kingdom
