= Herstmonceux Place =

House in East Sussex, England

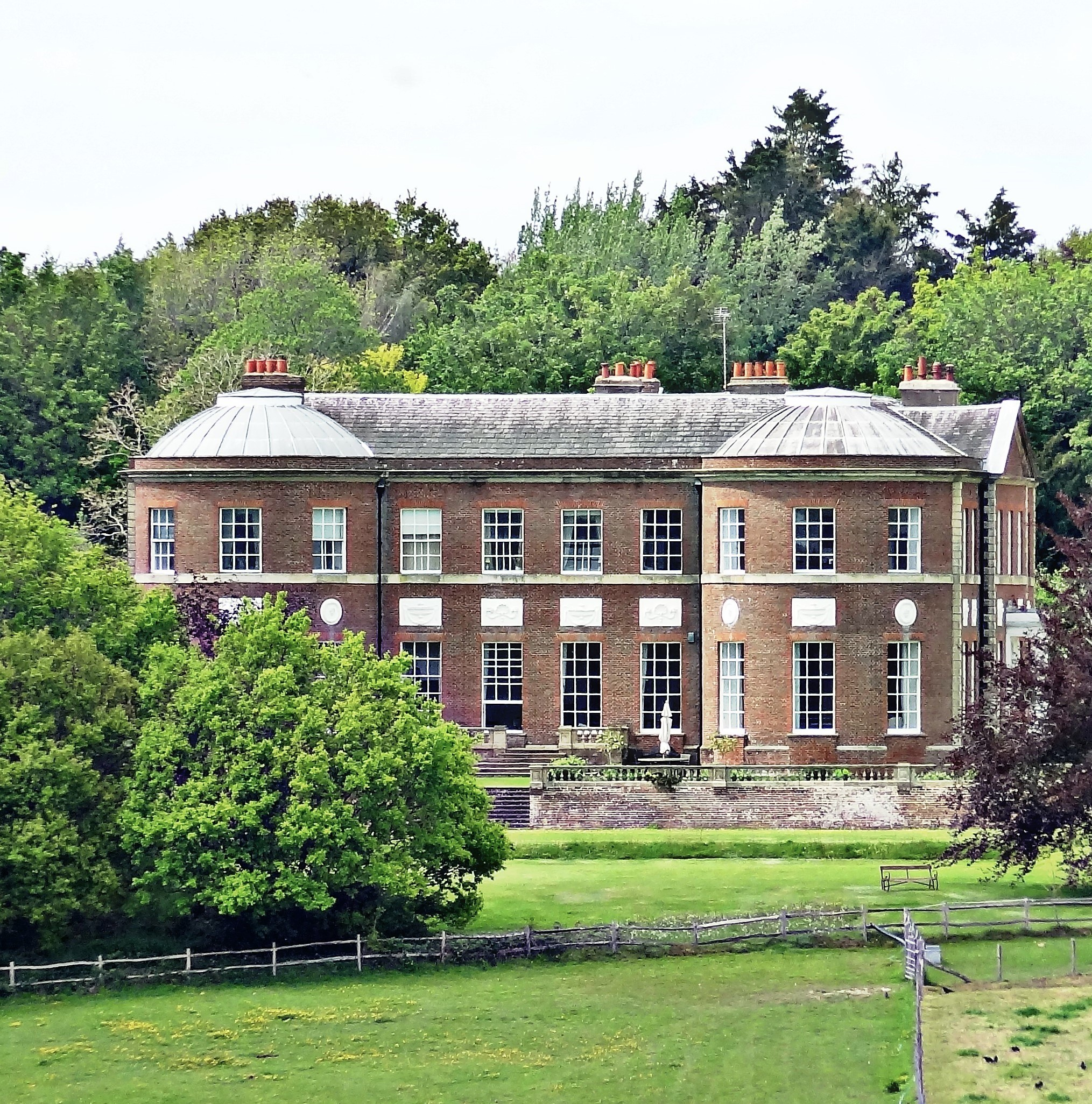
- The house in 2021

- Location within East Sussex

General information
- Location: Church Road, Herstmonceux, East Sussex, England
- Coordinates: 50.8759°N 0.3288°E
- Year built: Early 18th century
- Renovated: 1777 (extended)

Renovating team
- Architect: Samuel Wyatt (1777)

Listed Building – Grade I
- Official name: Herstmonceux Place
- Designated: 13 October 1952
- Reference no.: 1043172

National Register of Historic Parks and Gardens
- Official name: Herstmonceux Castle and Place
- Designated: 25 March 1987
- Reference no.: 1000231

Herstmonceux Place is an 18th-century country house on Church Road in Herstmonceux, a village in East Sussex, England. In 1777 the house was enlarged for the Reverend Robert Hare, with Samuel Wyatt overseeing the work. Bricks for the extension were taken from Herstmonceux Castle. It was divided into apartments in the 1950s. The house stands within a 148-hectare (370-acre) shared estate with the castle. Herstmonceux Place is a Grade I listed building.

The gardens and parks of Herstmonceux Place and Castle are Grade II* listed on the Register of Historic Parks and Gardens.

== See also ==
- Grade I listed buildings in East Sussex
- Listed buildings in Herstmonceux
