= John de Radynden =

British politician

Sir John de Radynden (Note: Variants include Raddingdean, Ratenden and Radingden) (1274 – c. 1350) was the only child of Walter and Agatha (daughter of Simon de Mucegros). He inherited his father's estate of Radynden, as well as the properties of his mother and his aunt, Alice de Mucegros. He initially was in the service of Hugh Despenser the Elder and later was an MP (Member of parliament) for Sussex.

== Family ==
In 1303, John is recorded as being in possession of his mother's holdings in Sussex and as he was her heir, it is probable that she had died by then. In 1304, his Aunt Alice died and left him land in Cambridgeshire, Essex, and Northamptonshire.

He was married to Joan and had three daughters: Alice, Maud and Agatha. His daughter Alice married Roger Dalyngrigge.

== Manor of Radynden ==
Over the centuries various families held the Manor of Radynden, first as tenants of the Bishop, then later as tenants of the Crown, and finally as lords.

The Manor of Preston, or Bishops Preston, was founded in the Saxon era and belonged to the Bishop of Selsey. Adjacent to the Manor of Preston was the Manor of Radynden. In 1086 the manor of Radynden was recorded in the Domesday Book as the demesne of 'Rateden', held by a certain Widard:

"In the same village Widard holds 6 hides and 1 virgate, of William. It answers for as much. Three freeholders held it from King Edward; they could go wherever they would. One of them had a hall; the villagers held parts of the other two. Land for 5 ploughs; it is in one manor. In lordship 1 ^{1/2} ploughs; 14 villages and 21 smallholders with 3 ^{1/2} ploughs. Meadow 7 acres; woodland 3 pigs. 4 sites in Lewes Value before 1066 £10; later £8 now £12."

— Domesday Book, Morris 1976, p. 12.14

By the 13th century, the tenancy was held by the Radynden family, with John inheriting from his father in 1318.

== Arms of the county of Sussex ==
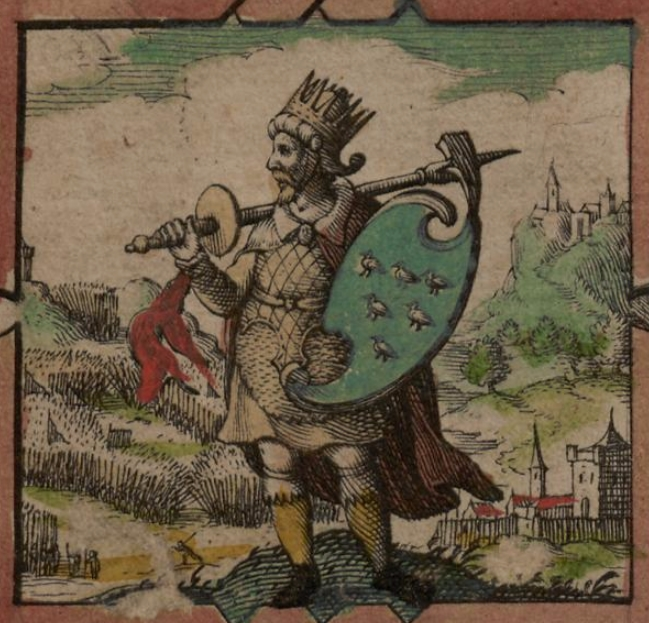
Depiction of Ælle holding a shield with a design representing Sussex, taken from John Speed's 1611 "Saxon Heptarchy"

In the 17th century, the cartographer John Speed depicted the Saxon king Ælle holding a shield with a design representing Sussex. However, it seems that Speed was repeating an earlier association between the emblem and the county. It is probable that Speed was influenced by the arms of John de Radynden a few centuries before.

John de Radynden took his name from that of the manor, and his coat of arms with silver (or 'argent') martlets on a blue (or 'azure') field that is the basis for the modern arms of the county of Sussex. (Note: John de Radynden is just one of several origin stories for the coat of arms. W.S. Ellis in Volume 37 of the Sussex Archaeological Collections (pp. 17-38) (1890)provides a list of other contenders.) There is some evidence to support this. Bodiam Castle, built in the 14th century, has three coats of arms set into the wall of its gatehouse. The central one is that of Edward Dalyngrigge, the builder of Bodiam Castle. His shield is flanked by that of Wardedieu on the left, for his wife Elizabeth, and de Radynden on the right, for his mother Alice (one of the three daughters of John de Radynden).

In Brighton, at the entrance to Preston Park, is a plinth that marks the former boundary of the manors of Preston to the north and Radynden to the south. The plinth has PRESTON PARK on the front and a narrow and unobtrusive vertical plaque on the side. The plaque explains the Radyden Gate connection.

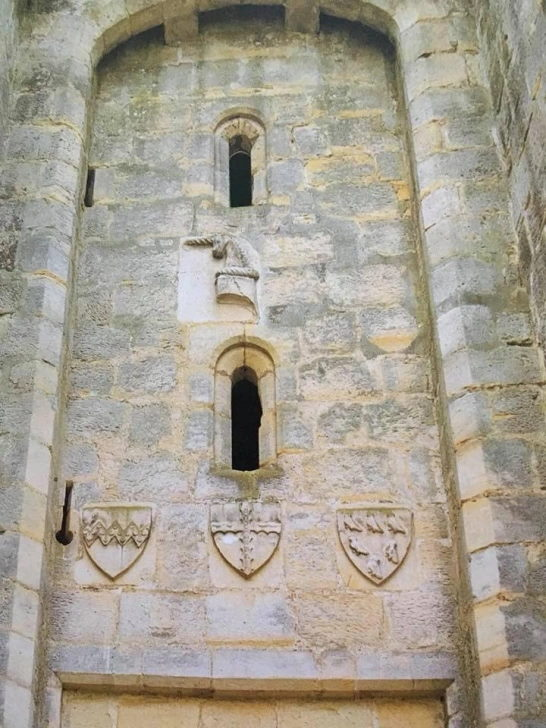
Gatehouse of Bodiam Castle with three coat of arms inset. The one on the right is that of John de Radynden

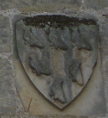
Raynden coat of arms on the gatehouse of Bodiam Castle

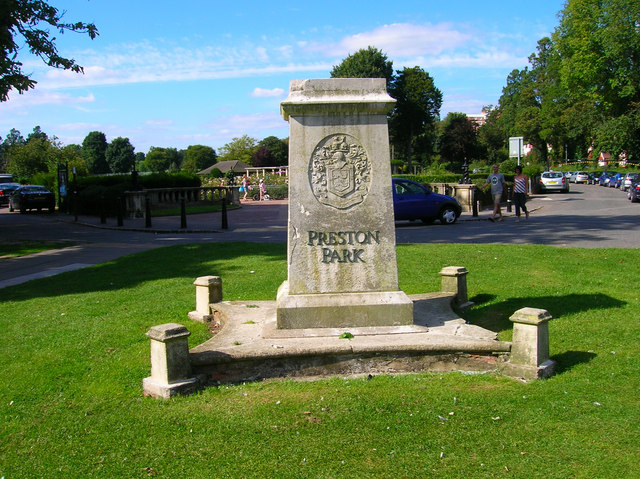
The Radynden Gate Pillar or Preston Park Radynden Gate Pillar at the entrance of Preston Park

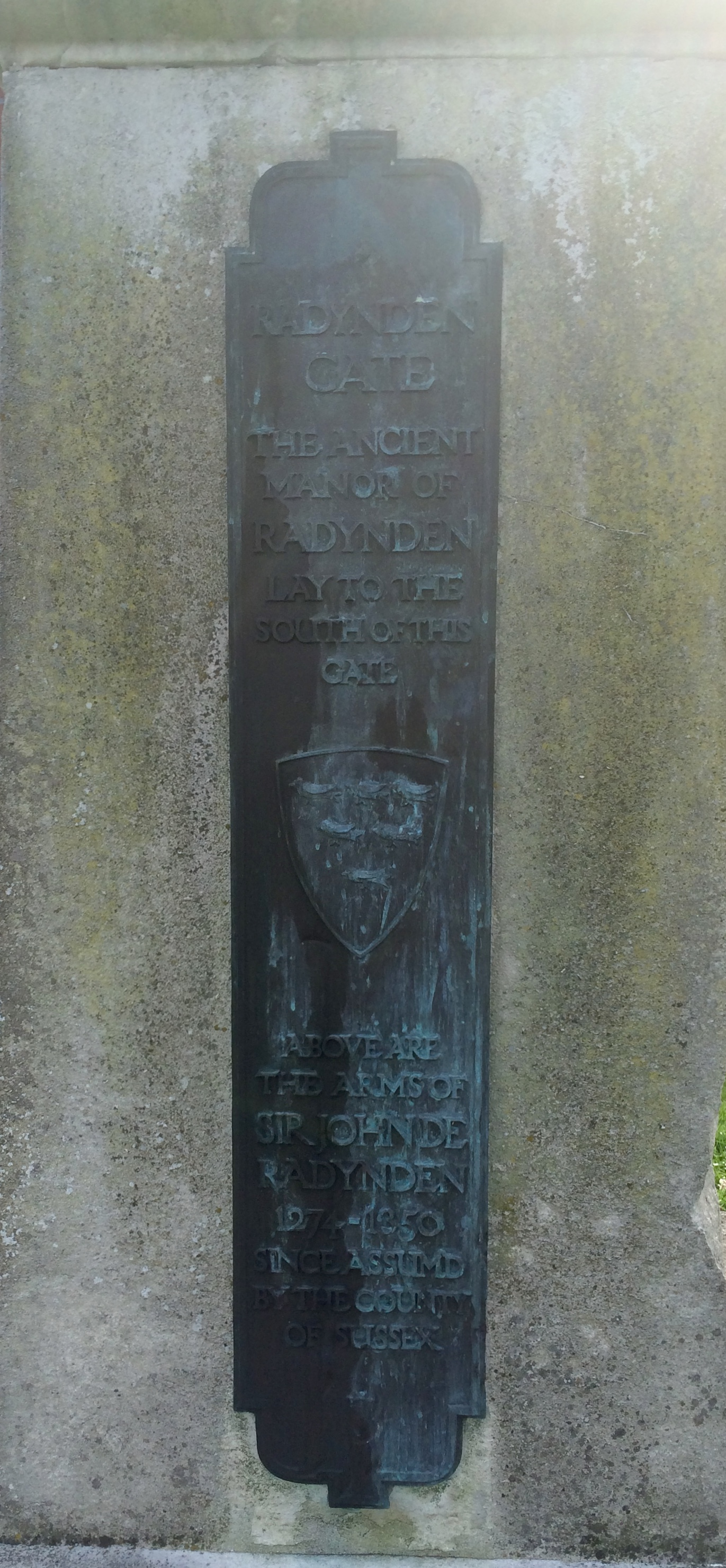
Plaque on Preston Park Radynden Gate Pillar

The plaque reads "Radynden Gate the ancient manor of Radynden lay to the south of this gate. Above are the arms of Sir John de Radynden 1274 - 1350 since assumed by the County of Sussex"

== Career ==
John de Radynden was employed by Hugh Despenser the Elder. This involved trips abroad, with his patron to perform various services of military and diplomatic nature on behalf of King Edward I.

In December 1296, Radynden was involved in an expedition to Flanders to help the Count of Flanders against the French. In 1305, Radynden went with Hugh le Despenser to Pope Clement V to obtain a Papal bull. The reason for this expedition was due to the King being forced by the parliament of 1301 to order an assessment of the royal forests. The papal bull freed the King from this concession.

In 1307, Edward I died and was succeeded by his son Edward II. Between 1316 and 1317 Radynden served as commissioner of array, with a remit to gather inhabitants of Sussex and ready them for military service. In February 1317, John de Radynden made a pilgrimage to the shrine of St. James the Great in Santiago de Compostela, Spain. Two years later he again visited Spain, this time with Hugh le Despenser in the King's service, and then again in 1320.

Hugh Despenser, Raynden's patron, became a leading adviser to Edward II. This relationship came to an abrupt end in 1326 when Roger Mortimer and the King's wife, Queen Isabella, led a rebellion against Edward II. They captured Despenser and had him hanged and then beheaded. Radynden seems to have been unaffected by these events.

Years earlier he had begun to take an active part in Sussex affairs. After his time as commissioner of array in 1316, he became Knight of the shire in 1319 for Sussex and was the MP in various parliaments until 1329. Then between 1337 and 1338, he was appointed one of the two Commissioners to levy scutage, in Sussex. Records indicate that Raynden remained active in local politics until he was 70 years old. He died around 1350.

== See also ==
- Symbols of Sussex
- Flag of Sussex

== Sources ==
- Allen, Kester (2015). "Radynden Gate". Read the Plaque.
- Ellis, W.S. (1890). "On The Origin Of The Arms Of Some Sussex Families (Second Series)". Sussex Archaeological Collections. 37: 17–38. doi:10.5284/1085530.
- Fryde, E. B.; Greenway, D. E.; Porter, S.; Roy, I (1986). Handbook of British Chronology (Second ed.). Cambridge, UK: Cambridge University Press. pp. 38–39. ISBN 0-86193-106-8.
- Hunt, William (1885). Despenser, Hugh le (The elder d.1326) . Dictionary of National Biography, 1885-1900. Vol. 14 – via Wikisource.
- Morris, John, ed. (1976). Domesday Book: Sussex. Chichester: Phillimore. ISBN 0-85033-146-3.
- Mortimer, Ian (2006). The Greatest Traitor: The Life of Sir Roger Mortimer, 1st Earl of March, Ruler of England, 1327–1330. London: Jonathan Cape. ISBN 0-312-34941-6.
- Prestwich, M. (2007). Plantagenet England 1225–1360. Oxford University Press. ISBN 978-0-19-922687-0.
- Salzman, L.F., ed. (1940). "The borough of Brighton: the Rape of Lewes". A History of the County of Sussex. British History Online. pp. 244–263.
- Thomas-Stanford, Charles (1921). "The Manor of Radynden". Sussex Archaeological Collections. 62: 64–92. doi:10.5284/1085847.
- Veitch, Robert (2021). "Emblems of gold in a field of blue". Sussex Living Magazine. 5 June 2021. Burgess Hill: Sussex Living and Aiir. Archived from the original on 30 October 2022.
- Vexilo (2013). "Sussex". British County Flags.
- Woodger, L.S (2020). "DALLINGRIDGE, Sir Edward (c.1346–1393), of Bodiam castle, Suss". History of Parliament. The History of Parliament Trust 1964–2013. Archived from the original on 6 November 2022.
