= Bodiam, South Africa =

Bodiam
- Location within Eastern Cape Location within South Africa Location within Africa
- Coordinates: 33.251°S 27.420°E
- Country: South Africa
- Province: Eastern Cape
- District: Amathole
- Municipality: Ngqushwa

Area
  - Total: 3.38 km^{2} (1.31 sq mi)

Population (2011)
  - Total: 414
  - Density: 122/km^{2} (317/sq mi)

Racial makeup (2011)
  - Black African: 99.8%
  - Coloured: 0.2%

First languages (2011)
  - Xhosa: 95.9%
  - English: 2.4%
  - Other: 1.7%
- Time zone: UTC+2 (SAST)

Bodiam is a town in Amathole District Municipality in the Eastern Cape province of South Africa.

Bodiam is 8 km (5 mi) from Bell and 38 km (24 mi) from Peddie, near the mouth of the Keiskamma River. It is named after Bodiam Castle in England and was formerly known as Mandy's Farm.

== See also ==
- Bodiam Castle
