= Seaford, Sussex (painting) =

Painting by William Collins

- Artist: William Collins
- Year: 1844
- Type: Oil on canvas, landscape painting
- Dimensions: 69.9 cm × 92.7 cm (27.5 in × 36.5 in)
- Location: Victoria and Albert Museum, London

Seaford, Sussex is an oil on canvas landscape painting by the British artist William Collins, from 1844.

== History and description ==
It depicts a view of the coast at Seaford Head in East Sussex overlooking the English Channel. A historic port Seaford was to develop as a resort town due to its connection to the railway network. Three children are in the foreground, one of them carving a toy boat with a Sussex trug basked laying beside them. Down below men can be seen at work on the beach collecting chalk and handling fishing nets. The town's Martello Tower dating from the Napoleonic Wars can be seen, while Newhaven is visible in the distance to the west. The expansion of Newhaven harbour during the Victorian period would lead to dramatic changes in the beach shown in the painting as much of the sand was replaced by shingle.

developed into a resort town. Collins established himself as a leading painter of landscapes and genre scenes during the Regency era and continued to be a prominent member of the Royal Academy. The painting was produced near the end of his career. Today the painting is in the possession of the Victoria and Albert Museum in South Kensington, having been donated by the art collector John Sheepshanks in 1857 as part of the Sheepshanks Gift.

== Bibliography ==
- Bury, Stephen (ed.) Benezit Dictionary of British Graphic Artists and Illustrators, Volume 1. OUP, 2012.
- Roe, Sonia. Oil Paintings in Public Ownership in the Victoria and Albert Museum. Public Catalogue Foundation, 2008.
- Wright, Christopher, Gordon, Catherine May & Smith, Mary Peskett. British and Irish Paintings in Public Collections: An Index of British and Irish Oil Paintings by Artists Born Before 1870 in Public and Institutional Collections in the United Kingdom and Ireland. Yale University Press, 2006.
