= Listed buildings in Herstmonceux =

Historic structures in East Sussex, England

Herstmonceux is a village and civil parish in the Wealden District, East Sussex, England. It contains three grade I, five grade II* and 69 grade II listed buildings that are recorded in the National Heritage List for England.

This list is based on the information retrieved online from Historic England.

== Key ==
Grade	Criteria
I	Buildings that are of exceptional interest
II*	Particularly important buildings of more than special interest
II	Buildings that are of special interest

== Listing ==
Name	Grade	Location	Type	Completed (Note: The date given is the date used by Historic England as significant for the initial building or that of an important part in the structure's description.)	Date designated	Grid ref. (Note: The grid reference is based on the British national grid reference system, sometimes known as OSGB36, used by the Ordnance Survey.) Geo-coordinates	Notes	Entry number (Note: The "List Entry Number" is a unique number assigned to each listed building and scheduled monument by Historic England.)	Image	Wikidata
Yew Tree Cottage	II	Butler's Lane			12 August 1981	TQ6323310960; 50°52′30″N 0°19′07″E		1043168	Upload Photo	Q26295116
Rose Cottage	II	Chapel Row			12 August 1981	TQ6383112175; 50°53′09″N 0°19′40″E		1353371	Upload Photo	Q26636305
Lime-end Farmhouse	II	Chapel Row			12 August 1981	TQ6377711977; 50°53′03″N 0°19′37″E		1043170	Upload Photo	Q26295118
East Lodge	II	Chapel Row, Lime Park			12 August 1981	TQ6379612148; 50°53′08″N 0°19′38″E		1180846	Upload Photo	Q26476169
Herstmonceux Congregational Church	II	Chapel Row			30 August 1966	TQ6384012141; 50°53′08″N 0°19′40″E		1043169	Herstmonceux Congregational Church More images	Q5744604
Wisteria Cottage and Primrose Cottage	II	Chapel Row			12 August 1981	TQ6388712245; 50°53′11″N 0°19′43″E		1285261	Wisteria Cottage and Primrose Cottage	Q26573968
Chilsham Green Farmhouse	II	Chilsham Lane			30 August 1966	TQ6354513623; 50°53′56″N 0°19′28″E		1180864	Upload Photo	Q26476189
Church Farmhouse	II	Church Road			30 August 1966	TQ6430210006; 50°51′58″N 0°20′01″E		1285242	Upload Photo	Q26573949
Milland Cottages	II	Church Road			12 August 1981	TQ6408410710; 50°52′21″N 0°19′51″E		1353334	Upload Photo	Q26636269
Milland Farmhouse	II	Church Road			13 October 1952	TQ6413110618; 50°52′18″N 0°19′53″E		1180908	Upload Photo	Q26476239
Cleavers Lyng	II	Church Road			12 August 1981	TQ6421810515; 50°52′15″N 0°19′57″E		1043171	Upload Photo	Q26295119
Herstmonceux Place	I	Church Road			13 October 1952	TQ6393711082; 50°52′34″N 0°19′44″E		1043172	Upload Photo	Q17535388
Barn at Cherry Croft Farm	II	Church Road			25 March 1996	TQ6394210791; 50°52′24″N 0°19′43″E		1119783	Upload Photo	Q26413075
Cherry Croft	II	Church Road			12 August 1981	TQ6396010834; 50°52′26″N 0°19′44″E		1180915	Upload Photo	Q26476247
The Parish Church of All Saints	I	Church Road			30 August 1966	TQ6427110186; 50°52′04″N 0°19′59″E		1353333	The Parish Church of All Saints More images	Q17535685
Carter's Corner Farmhouse	II	Cowbeech			12 August 1981	TQ6148513144; 50°53′43″N 0°17′42″E		1285239	Upload Photo	Q26573947
Chapel Cottage	II	Cowbeech			12 March 2001	TQ6194314599; 50°54′29″N 0°18′07″E		1246865	Chapel Cottage	Q26539230
Blackford Farmhouse	II	Cowbeech			12 August 1981	TQ6099214371; 50°54′23″N 0°17′18″E		1285205	Upload Photo	Q26573917
Cowbeech House	II*	Cowbeech			30 August 1966	TQ6195714518; 50°54′27″N 0°18′08″E		1353335	Upload Photo	Q17556961
Thornden Farm Cottages	II	Cowbeech			12 August 1981	TQ6207514920; 50°54′40″N 0°18′15″E		1353336	Upload Photo	Q26636270
Cowbeech Farmhouse	II	Cowbeech			13 October 1952	TQ6186014184; 50°54′16″N 0°18′02″E		1180962	Upload Photo	Q26476303
Batchelors and the Garden Wall to the East	II	Cowbeech			12 August 1981	TQ6172813526; 50°53′55″N 0°17′55″E		1043174	Upload Photo	Q26295123
Court Horeham	II*	Cowbeech			30 August 1966	TQ6097215166; 50°54′49″N 0°17′19″E		1043176	Upload Photo	Q17556385
Corner Cottage	II	Cowbeech			12 August 1981	TQ6194314558; 50°54′28″N 0°18′07″E		1043173	Corner Cottage More images	Q26295121
Moieties	II	Cowbeech			12 August 1981	TQ6202115534; 50°55′00″N 0°18′13″E		1180976	Upload Photo	Q26476316
The Merry Harriers Inn	II	Cowbeech			12 August 1981	TQ6191114555; 50°54′28″N 0°18′06″E		1180945	Upload Photo	Q26476286
Beadles Cottage	II	Cowbeech			12 August 1981	TQ6206715558; 50°55′00″N 0°18′15″E		1043175	Upload Photo	Q26295125
Courtlands Farmhouse	II	Cowbeech			12 August 1981	TQ6189716205; 50°55′21″N 0°18′07″E		1180980	Upload Photo	Q26476320
Hollies	II	Flowers Green			12 August 1981	TQ6370811564; 50°52′49″N 0°19′33″E		1180998	Upload Photo	Q26476341
Pastures	II	Flowers Green			30 August 1966	TQ6372311240; 50°52′39″N 0°19′33″E		1181006	Upload Photo	Q26476349
Pernes	II	Flowers Green			12 August 1981	TQ6371011435; 50°52′45″N 0°19′33″E		1043177	Upload Photo	Q26295127
Little Butlers	II	Flowers Green			12 August 1981	TQ6370711391; 50°52′44″N 0°19′32″E		1043178	Upload Photo	Q26295128
Flowers Green Cottages	II	1, 2 and 3, Flowers Green			12 August 1981	TQ6377911594; 50°52′50″N 0°19′36″E		1353337	Upload Photo	Q26636271
Bellevue and Perrywinkle Cottage	II	Gardner Street			12 August 1981	TQ6360712552; 50°53′21″N 0°19′29″E		1353338	Upload Photo	Q26636272
Carriers	II	Gardner Street			12 August 1981	TQ6349212595; 50°53′23″N 0°19′23″E		1353360	Upload Photo	Q26636294
Barclays Bank and Bank Flat	II	Gardner Street			12 August 1981	TQ6358912581; 50°53′22″N 0°19′28″E		1285219	Upload Photo	Q26573931
Cotoneaster	II	Gardner Street			12 August 1981	TQ6355412560; 50°53′22″N 0°19′26″E		1043141	Upload Photo	Q26295068
London Cottage	II	Gardner Street			12 August 1981	TQ6354712594; 50°53′23″N 0°19′26″E		1181009	Upload Photo	Q26476352
Arnocks and Arnocks Cottage	II	Gardner Street			12 August 1981	TQ6359412551; 50°53′21″N 0°19′28″E		1043140	Upload Photo	Q26295065
The Sundial Restaurant	II	Gardner Street			12 August 1981	TQ6366512587; 50°53′23″N 0°19′32″E		1043181	Upload Photo	Q26295134
Appleshaw	II	Gardner Street			12 August 1981	TQ6317912771; 50°53′29″N 0°19′08″E		1043147	Upload Photo	Q26295078
The Brewers' Arms Inn	II	Gardner Street			12 August 1981	TQ6356612584; 50°53′23″N 0°19′27″E		1043180	The Brewers' Arms Inn More images	Q26295131
Toad Hall	II	Gardner Street			12 August 1981	TQ6331812717; 50°53′27″N 0°19′15″E		1181180	Upload Photo	Q26476517
Elm Tree House	II	Gardner Street			30 August 1966	TQ6371412607; 50°53′23″N 0°19′35″E		1181022	Upload Photo	Q26476369
Higham House and Higham Cottage	II	Gardner Street			13 October 1952	TQ6377012534; 50°53′21″N 0°19′37″E		1043182	Higham House and Higham Cottage	Q26295135
Chestnut Cottages	II	Gardner Street			12 August 1981	TQ6350712605; 50°53′23″N 0°19′24″E		1043179	Upload Photo	Q26295130
Eversley	II	Gardner Street			12 August 1981	TQ6361612550; 50°53′21″N 0°19′30″E		1043183	Upload Photo	Q26295137
The Keys	II	Gardner Street			13 October 1952	TQ6371812546; 50°53′21″N 0°19′35″E		1181025	Upload Photo	Q26476372
Ray's Cottage	II	Gardner Street			12 August 1981	TQ6336712637; 50°53′24″N 0°19′17″E		1353361	Upload Photo	Q26636295
Meadow Cottage	II	Gardner Street			12 August 1981	TQ6315912774; 50°53′29″N 0°19′07″E		1043148	Upload Photo	Q26295079
1 and 2 the Old Post Office, Gardner Street	II	1 and 2 The Old Post Office, Gardner Street			18 March 1977	TQ6350712560; 50°53′22″N 0°19′24″E		1353356	Upload Photo	Q26636290
Ginger Green Farmhouse	II	Ginger's Green Lane			30 August 1966	TQ6228112578; 50°53′24″N 0°18′21″E		1043142	Upload Photo	Q26295070
The Stables to the West of Buckwell Place House	II	Hailsham Road			12 August 1981	TQ6262412014; 50°53′05″N 0°18′38″E		1353358	Upload Photo	Q26636292
Monk's Rest	II	Hailsham Road			12 August 1981	TQ6238412063; 50°53′07″N 0°18′26″E		1353357	Upload Photo	Q26636291
Buckwell Place	II*	Hailsham Road			12 August 1981	TQ6265912008; 50°53′05″N 0°18′40″E		1043143	Upload Photo	Q17556381
Walled Garden to North of Herstmonceux Castle	II	Herstmonceux Park			26 September 1989	TQ6466210551; 50°52′16″N 0°20′20″E		1243641	Upload Photo	Q26536308
Herstmonceux Castle	I	Herstmonceux Park			24 July 1989	TQ6465510363; 50°52′10″N 0°20′19″E		1272785	Herstmonceux Castle More images	Q2652207
Deudney's Farmhouse	II	Old Road, Magham Down			13 October 1952	TQ6161411970; 50°53′05″N 0°17′46″E		1043144	Upload Photo	Q26295072
Aladdin's Cottage	II	Stunts Green			19 October 2001	TQ6200313295; 50°53′47″N 0°18′08″E		1389577	Upload Photo	Q26669011
Little Manor	II	Stunt's Green			30 August 1966	TQ6253212969; 50°53′36″N 0°18′35″E		1353359	Upload Photo	Q26636293
Broyles Cottage	II	Stunt's Green			12 August 1981	TQ6202813319; 50°53′48″N 0°18′10″E		1285133	Upload Photo	Q26573848
Gainsborough Cottage	II	Stunt's Green			12 August 1981	TQ6245413064; 50°53′39″N 0°18′31″E		1043146	Upload Photo	Q26295075
Stunt's Green Farmhouse	II	Stunt's Green			13 October 1952	TQ6260813060; 50°53′39″N 0°18′39″E		1043145	Upload Photo	Q26295073
Bedlam Green	II	West End			12 August 1981	TQ6328412663; 50°53′25″N 0°19′13″E		1181208	Upload Photo	Q26476542
Miller's House	II	Windmill Hill			12 August 1981	TQ6450612223; 50°53′10″N 0°20′15″E		1353362	Upload Photo	Q26636296
Field House and Field Cottage	II	Windmill Hill			12 August 1981	TQ6483712104; 50°53′06″N 0°20′31″E		1353363	Upload Photo	Q26636297
Allfrey House	II	Windmill Hill			12 August 1981	TQ6441912262; 50°53′11″N 0°20′10″E		1043149	Upload Photo	Q26295082
Mill House	II	Windmill Hill			12 August 1981	TQ6471312132; 50°53′07″N 0°20′25″E		1043150	Upload Photo	Q26295085
Victoria Lodge and Pope's Farmhouse	II	Windmill Hill			12 August 1981	TQ6448312281; 50°53′12″N 0°20′13″E		1181238	Upload Photo	Q26476571
Hormes House	II	Windmill Hill			12 August 1981	TQ6423212306; 50°53′13″N 0°20′01″E		1181219	Upload Photo	Q26476552
Thorpe House	II	Windmill Hill			12 August 1981	TQ6498512046; 50°53′04″N 0°20′39″E		1028520	Upload Photo	Q26279623
Old School House	II	1-5, Windmill Hill			12 August 1981	TQ6486512020; 50°53′03″N 0°20′33″E		1043151	Upload Photo	Q26295087
Elm Cottage	II	3 and 4, Windmill Hill			12 August 1981	TQ6482112109; 50°53′06″N 0°20′30″E		1181264	Upload Photo	Q26476592
3, Herstmonceux	II	3, Windmill Hill, Posey Green			12 August 1981	TQ6491412049; 50°53′04″N 0°20′35″E		1028519	Upload Photo	Q26279622
4 and 5, Herstmonceux	II	4 and 5, Windmill Hill, Posey Green			12 August 1981	TQ6493012043; 50°53′04″N 0°20′36″E		1300184	Upload Photo	Q26587509
The Windmill	II*	Windmill Lane, Windmill Hill			13 October 1952	TQ6470612154; 50°53′07″N 0°20′25″E		1285093	The Windmill More images	Q8024294
Herstmonceux Science Centre	II*				26 March 2003	TQ6516010473; 50°52′13″N 0°20′45″E		1391813	Herstmonceux Science Centre More images	Q17557034

== See also ==
- Grade I listed buildings in East Sussex
- Grade II* listed buildings in East Sussex

== Sources ==
- Antram, Nicholas; Pevsner, Nikolaus (2012) [1965], Sussex: East, The Buildings of England, New Haven and London: Yale University Press, ISBN 978-0-300-18473-0
