= Herstmonceux Park =

Coordinates: 50.873°N 0.344°E

- Site of Special Scientific Interest
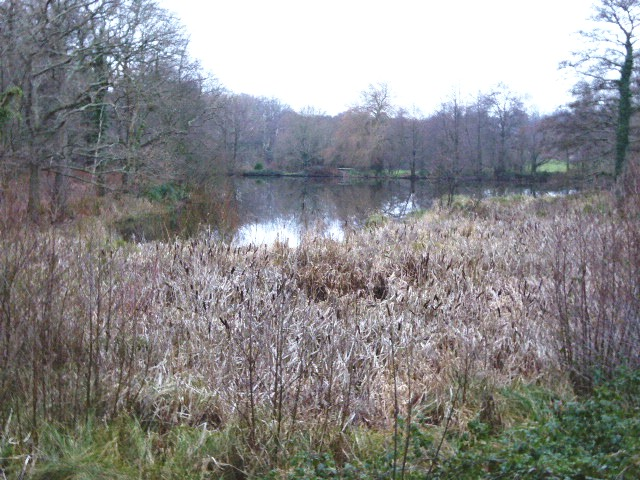
- Location of Herstmonceux Park.
- Area of search: East Sussex
- Grid reference: TQ 650 108
- Interest: Biological
- Area: 4.3 hectares (11 acres)
- Notification date: 1986
- Location map: Magic Map

Herstmonceux Park is a 4.3-hectare (11-acre) biological Site of Special Scientific Interest south of Herstmonceux in East Sussex.

This narrow stream valley has seven examples of wetland habitats on Tunbridge Wells sandstone and it is notable for its fen vegetation. The site is the location of two plants which are rare in south-east England, milk-parsley and Cornish moneywort. There are several artificial ponds which have a variety of aquatic plant species.

A public footpath runs through the site
