= Flag of Sussex =

Flag of English county

Sussex
- Proportion: 3:5
- Adopted: 20 May 2011
- Designed by: Traditional

The Flag of Sussex is the flag of the traditional and historic county of Sussex. The flag was registered by the Flag Institute on Friday 20 May 2011 as a 'traditional' county flag as a result of a campaign started in August 2010, by Sussex resident Brady Ells, with support from his father, David. The Flag was certified by Chief Vexillologist, Graham Bartram. It was first flown officially on Saturday 28 May 2011 at Lewes Castle. and was flown from the Department of Communities and Local Government at Eland House, London on Sussex Day, 16 June 2011.

== Official registered flag ==
The flag of Sussex was registered as a result of a campaign started in August 2010, under the name of Saint Richard's Flag, after the county's patron saint, Saint Richard of Chichester. The flag was slightly altered from the original proposal before its registration by the Flag Institute. The flag represents the whole of Sussex and is based on the traditional emblem of Sussex, six gold martlets on a blue field representing the six rapes of Sussex. The first known recording of this emblem being used to represent the county was in 1611 when cartographer John Speed deployed it to represent the Kingdom of the South Saxons. However, it seems that Speed was repeating an earlier association between the emblem and the county, rather than being the inventor of the association. It is now firmly regarded that the county emblem originated and derived from the coat of arms of the 14th century Knight of the Shire, Sir John de Radynden. Today it is used by many Sussex organisations, such as Sussex County Cricket Club, Sussex County Football Association and also features on the village sign of Ringmer in Sussex. The Flag Institute manages and maintains the national flag registry of the United Kingdom, and therefore this is now the definitive County Flag of Sussex.

=== Colours ===
The colour specifications for the Flag of Sussex are:

Scheme	Blue	Gold
Pantone (Paper)	286 C	109 C
Web colours	#0033A0	#FFD100
RGB	0, 51, 160	255, 209, 0
CMYK	100%, 68%, 0%, 37%	0%, 18%, 100%, 0%

== Alternative designs ==
=== BBC competition ===
The winning entry in a competition held in June 2008 under the auspices of the BBC for a flag to commemorate "Sussex Day" (16 June) which has been described as a celebration of all things uniquely Sussex. The winning entry was designed by Martin Shrimpton from Woodingdean in Brighton. Chairman of the judging panel, Graham Bartram said: "Well it had very clear Sussex symbolism. The colours were bright and I think it's just going to look like a really nice flag."

The BBC competition winner would, according to the Sussex Association, be an inappropriate choice for a county flag of Sussex that is meant to be representative of the traditional county of Sussex, rather than a joint flag for the administrative counties of East Sussex and West Sussex. This flag portrays an amalgamation of County Council arms, which do not represent any county and only represent the councils. The county flag of Sussex does not need to feature the colour red on it to represent the east of the county; red only represents East Sussex County Council. There are many examples where blue is used to represent the county of Sussex, in the east of the county as well as the west.

Many of the proposed designs incorporated the charge of six martlets (a mythical bird found in heraldry, essentially representative of a swift) that have been traditionally associated with Sussex for centuries and that have appeared on the various forms of arms used in the county. However, this flag was never registered by the Flag Institute.

=== Other flags ===
There was also a similar previously proposed Saint Richards Flag with different colours to the registered flag. There was also a flag proposed by the Sussex Party, a minor regionalist group, which proposed a flag consisting of four horizontal bands coloured blue, green, yellow and blue, representing the Sussex landscape, with a yellow disc in the top-left corner representing the sun. An alternative Sussex flag was designed for Sussex Day 2019 with Afro-Caribbean styling to reflect the diversity of Sussex people.

The Sussex Motor Yacht Club, located in Brighton, was founded in 1907 and uses a burgee that employs Sussex-related emblems. The club's burgee is blue, with a white shield which bears the six martlets (heraldic swallows) in red (gules) atop a three-bladed propeller.

=== Banners of arms ===
The flag formerly used by West Sussex County Council

The flag used by East Sussex County Council

East Sussex County Council uses a flag based on the East Sussex County Council coat of arms, which also features the six gold martlets from the heraldic shield of Sussex. West Sussex County Council maintained the basic colours and pattern of the traditional emblem, six gold martlets on blue, but added a gold chief – a bar across the top of the shield. This design is still commercially available as the "Flag of West Sussex", from a number of outlets. The flag actually represents the 1888–1974 county council of West Sussex rather than the county.

West Sussex County Council promoted a different flag to celebrate Sussex Day from 2007. This was also billed as the 'West Sussex Flag' but is no longer on sale from the County Council.

== Gallery ==
BBC competition winner

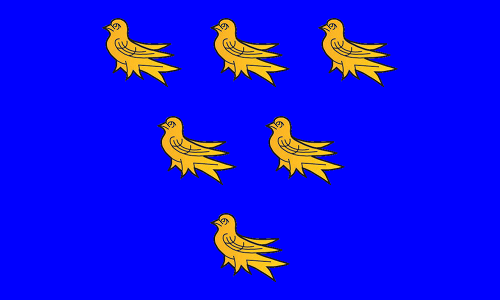
Previously proposed Flag of Sussex - Saint Richard's Flag

Flag proposed for Sussex by the Sussex Party

The Cross of Saint Richard of Chichester, commonly flown on Sussex Day

The flag of East Sussex County Council

The former flag of West Sussex County Council is commercially available as the "Flag of West Sussex".

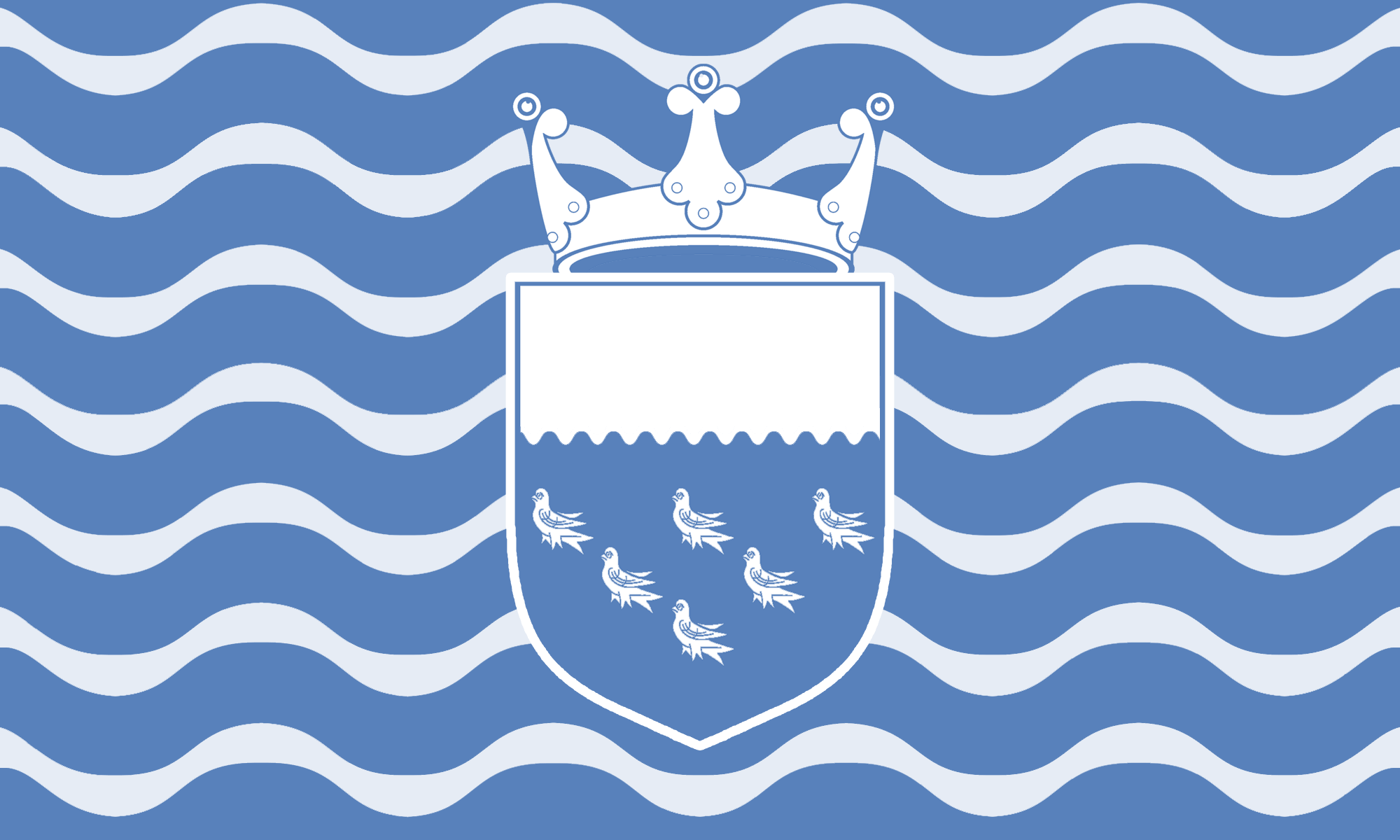
Flag promoted by West Sussex County Council showing the County Council coat of arms

Burgee of the Sussex Motor Yacht Club

== See also ==
- Coat of arms of Sussex
- Sussex

== Bibliography ==
- Sinha, Umi; Grant, Colin; Atta, Dean, eds. (2019). Hidden Sussex. Writing Our Legacy. ISBN 978-1-9161290-0-9.
