= Coat of arms of Sussex =

Heraldic shield of English county

A heraldic shield has been associated with the historic county of Sussex since the seventeenth century. The device, displaying six martlets or heraldic swallows on a shield, later formed the basis of the flag of Sussex and the armorial bearings granted to the county councils of East and West Sussex.

== History ==
The first known recording of this Heraldic shield being used to represent the county was in 1611 when cartographer John Speed deployed it to represent the Kingdom of the South Saxons in his atlas The Theatre of the Empire of Great Britaine. However it seems that Speed was repeating an earlier association between the emblem and the county, rather than being the inventor of the association. It is now firmly regarded that the county Heraldic shield originated and derived from the coat of arms of the 14th century Knight of the Shire, Sir John de Radynden.

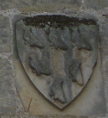
Raynden coat of arms on the gatehouse of 14th century Bodiam Castle.

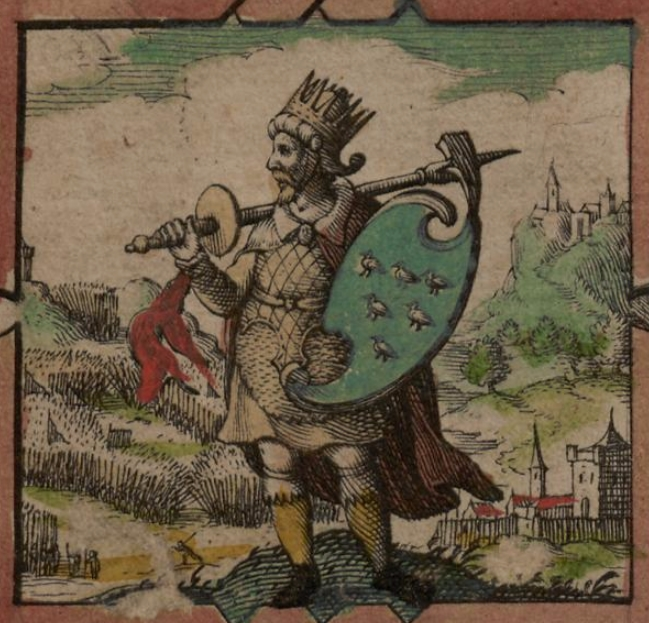
Part of John Speeds 17th century map of the heptarchy. Ælle of Sussex is shown with a shield with silver (or 'argent') martlets on a blue (or 'azure') background.

The modern Arms of Sussex with gold martlets on a blue background

The modern Arms of Sussex are thought to have been derived from that of John de Raynden(1274-1350)

The seal of the clerk of the peace of the county bore the Heraldic shield, as did the badges of the East Sussex Constabulary and the Sussex Yeomanry.

== County councils ==
The Local Government Act 1888 introduced administrative counties each governed by an elected county council. Sussex was divided into two administrative counties: With the exception of the county boroughs of Brighton, Hastings and from 1911, Eastbourne, East Sussex County Council administered the rapes of Lewes, Pevensey and Hastings, while West Sussex County Council administered the rapes of Chichester, Arundel and Bramber. Each county council was required to adopt a common seal.

The Local Government Act 1972 reorganised councils throughout England and Wales from 1974. In Sussex two new non-metropolitan counties of East Sussex and West Sussex were created, but with different boundaries to the administrative counties abolished by the 1972 Act. Accordingly, the two county councils had to apply for new arms. Both county councils were granted arms in 1975, based on those previously used.

=== East Sussex ===
Coat of arms granted to East Sussex County Council in 1937

Coat of arms granted to East Sussex County Council in 1975

East Sussex County Council adopted a seal in 1889. The seal bore a quartered shield. The first quarter represents Sussex, while the second, third and fourth quarters each represent one of the traditional Sussex subdivisions, known as rapes, administered by East Sussex County Council at the time.

- The first quarter bore the traditional six gold martlets on blue of Sussex
- The second quarter consisted of gold and blue checks from the arms of the De Warenne family, Earls of Surrey and lords of the barony of Lewes
- The third quarter was gold with a red displayed eagle, arms of the De Aquila (L'Aigle) family, lords of the rape of Pevensey
- Representing the rape of Hastings, the fourth quarter bore the arms of Hastings

These unofficial arms remained in use until 1937 when a grant of arms from the College of Arms was obtained on 10 September. A red shield was adopted and a gold Saxon crown was added for heraldic difference. The arms were blazoned as: Gules, six martlets three, two and one, and in chief a Saxon crown or

East Sussex County Council was granted a new coat of arms on 29 August 1975. The arms are identical to the 1937 grant with the addition of a silver wavy line, representative of the coastal county boroughs of Brighton, Eastbourne and Hastings added to the county in 1974.

=== West Sussex ===
Coat of arms granted to West Sussex County Council in 1889

West Sussex County Council promptly applied to the College of Arms for a grant of arms, which were granted on 18 May 1889. The cost of the grant was met by the Duke of Norfolk, a member of the council and titular head of the College of Arms. West Sussex was the first county council to become armigerous.

The arms were the same as those associated with the historic county with the addition of a gold "chief" or band at the top of the shield. The blazon or technical description was: Azure, six martlets, three, two and one a chief or.

West Sussex County Council was granted new arms on 14 January 1975. The gold chief of the 1889 shield was modified by being given an "indented" edge. A crest was added, shown atop a helm and decorative mantling. The crest represented the areas transferred from East Sussex and Surrey in 1974: the Saxon crown was taken from the East Sussex arms and the acorns from those of Surrey.

The blazon of the arms is: Azure six martlets three two and one and a chief indented or, and for a crest on a wreath of the colours a sprig of oak proper fructed with two acorns or within a Saxon crown also or.

== Other organisations ==
Arms of Sussex Police Authority

Badge of Sussex Police

- The Sussex Police Authority was granted arms on 30 May 1969: a blue shield bearing a gold tower between five gold martlets.
- The Sussex County Cricket Club uses the traditional county arms as its badge.
- The Sussex Motor Yacht Club, founded in 1907 and headquartered in Brighton, uses the traditional Sussex county arms (i.e., the six martlets) on its club burgee; it depicts the martlets in red, and places them on a white shield, surmounting a three-bladed propeller, which also in red.
- The University of Sussex's coat of arms features the six martlets.

== See also ==
- List of English counties' coats of arms
- Flag of Sussex
- Sussex
