= Bodiam Castle =

14th-century moated castle near Robertsbridge in East Sussex, England

- Bodiam, East Sussex, England
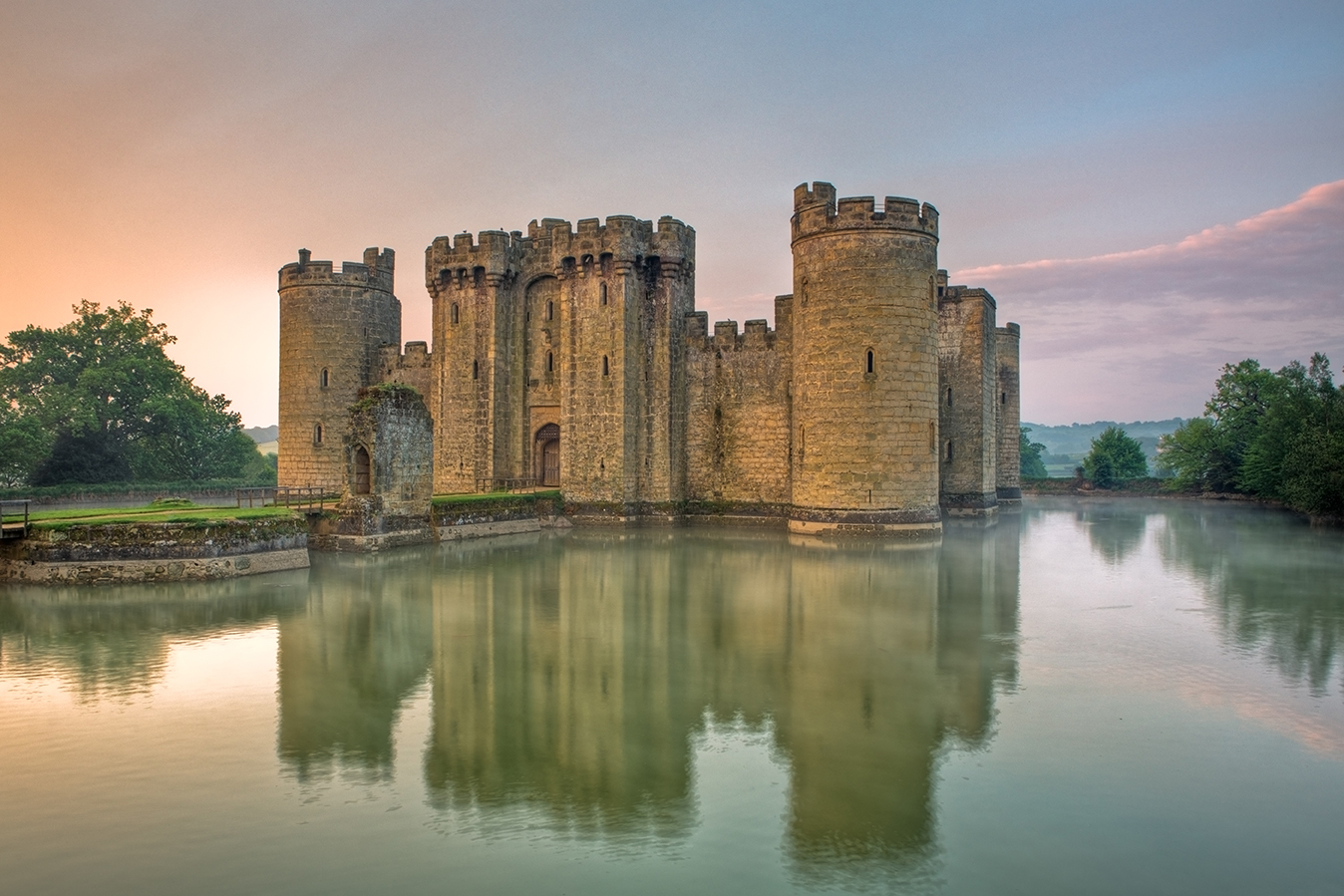

Site information
- Owner: National Trust
- Condition: Ruins

Location
- Location within East Sussex
- Coordinates: 51.0023°N 0.5435°E
- Grid reference: grid reference TQ785256

Site history
- Built: 1385; 641 years ago
- Built by: Sir Edward Dalyngrigge
- Materials: Sandstone
- Demolished: Post English Civil War
- Battles/wars: English Civil War

Listed Building – Grade I
- Official name: Bodiam Castle
- Designated: 3 August 1961
- Reference no.: 1044134

Bodiam Castle (/ˈboʊdiəm/; traditionally /ˈbɒdʒəm/]) is a 14th-century moated castle near Robertsbridge in East Sussex, England. It was built in 1385 by Sir Edward Dalyngrigge with the permission of Richard II, ostensibly to defend the area against French invasion during the Hundred Years' War. Of quadrangular plan, Bodiam Castle has no keep, having its various chambers built around the outer defensive walls and inner courts. Its corners and entrance are marked by towers, and topped by battlements. Its structure, details and situation in an artificial watery landscape indicate that display was an important aspect of the castle's design as well as defence. It was the home of the Dalyngrigge family and the centre of the manor of Bodiam.

Possession of Bodiam Castle passed through several generations of Dalyngrigges, until their line became extinct and the castle passed by marriage to the Lewknor family. During the Wars of the Roses, Sir Thomas Lewknor supported the House of Lancaster, and when Richard III of the House of York became king in 1483, a force was despatched to besiege Bodiam Castle. It is unrecorded whether the siege went ahead, but it is thought that Bodiam surrendered without much resistance. The castle was confiscated, but returned to the Lewknors when Henry VII of the House of Tudor became king in 1485. Descendants of the Lewknors owned the castle until at least the 16th century.

By the start of the English Civil War in 1641, Bodiam Castle was in the possession of John Tufton, 2nd Earl of Thanet. He supported the Royalist cause, and sold the castle to help pay fines levied against him by Parliament. The castle was subsequently dismantled, and was left as a picturesque ruin until its purchase by John Fuller in 1829. Under his auspices, the castle was partially restored before being sold to George Cubitt, 1st Baron Ashcombe, and later to Lord Curzon, both of whom undertook further restoration work. The castle is protected as a Grade I listed building and Scheduled Monument. It has been owned by the National Trust since 1925, donated by Lord Curzon on his death, and is open to the public.

== Background ==
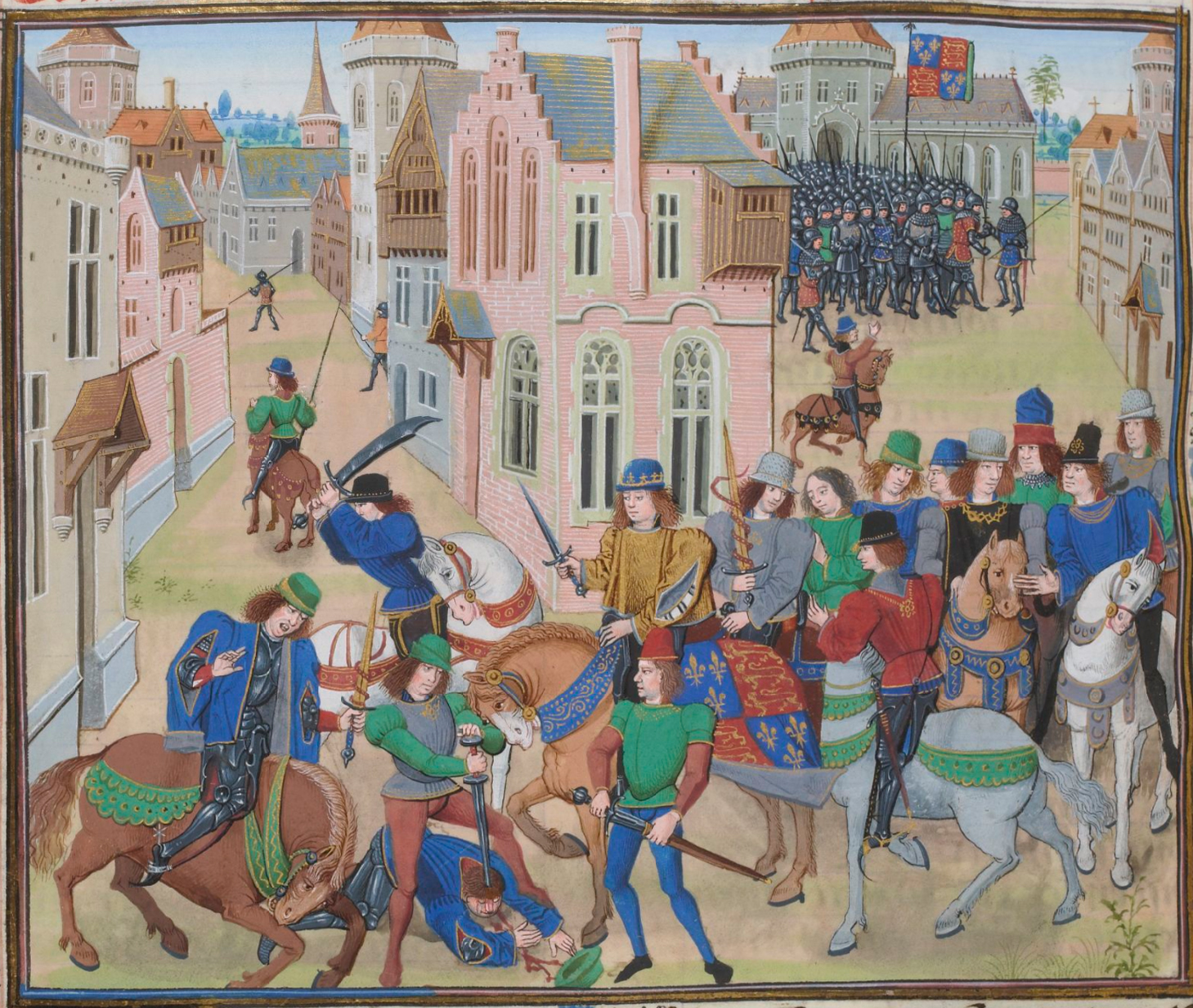
A 15th-century depiction of the killing of Wat Tyler, leader of the Peasants' Revolt in 1381. Edward Dalyngrigge helped Richard II put down the revolt.

Edward Dalyngrigge was a younger son and thus deprived of his father's estates through the practice of primogeniture, hence he had to make his own fortunes. By 1378, he owned the manor of Bodiam by marrying into a land-owning family. From 1379 to 1388, Dalyngrigge was a Knight of the Shire for Sussex and one of the most influential people in the county. By the time he applied to the king for a licence to crenellate (build a castle), the Hundred Years' War had been fought between England and France for nearly 50 years. Edward III of England (reigned 1327–1377) pressed his claim for the French throne and secured the territories of Aquitaine and Calais. Dalyngrigge was one of many Englishmen who travelled to France to seek their fortune as members of Free Companies – groups of mercenaries who fought for the highest bidder. He left for France in 1367 and journeyed with Lionel, Duke of Clarence, son of Edward III. After fighting under Richard Fitzalan, 3rd Earl of Arundel, Dalyngrigge joined the company of Sir Robert Knolles, a notorious commander who was reputed to have made 100,000 gold crowns as a mercenary from pillage and plunder. It was as a member of the Free Companies that Dalyngrigge raised the money to build Bodiam Castle; he returned to England in 1377.

The Treaty of Bruges (1375) ensured peace for two years, but after it expired, fighting resumed between England and France. In 1377 Edward III was succeeded by Richard II. During the war, England and France struggled for control of the English Channel, with raids on both coasts. With the renewed hostilities, Parliament voted that money should be spent on defending and fortifying England's south coast, and defences were erected in Kent in anticipation of a French invasion. There was internal unrest as well as external threats, and Dalyngrigge was involved in suppressing the Peasants' Revolt of 1381. The manor of Bodiam was granted a charter in 1383 permitting a weekly market and an annual fair to be held. In 1385, a fleet of 1,200 ships – variously cogs, barges, and galleys – gathered across the English Channel at Sluys, Flanders; the population of southern England was in a state of panic. Later in the year, Edward Dalyngrigge was granted a licence to fortify his manor house.

== Construction and use ==
Know that of our special grace we have granted and given licence on behalf of ourselves and our heirs, so far as in us lies, to our beloved and faithful Edward Dalyngrigge Knight, that he may strengthen with a wall of stone and lime, and crenellate and may construct and make into a Castle his manor house of Bodiam, near the sea, in the County of Sussex, for the defence of the adjacent country, and the resistance to our enemies ... In witness of which etc. The King at Westminster 20 October.

— Excerpt from the licence to crenellate allowing Edward Dalyngrigge to build a castle from the Patent Rolls of 1385–89

Dalyngrigge's licence from Richard II permitted him to refortify his existing manor house, but instead he chose a fresh site to build a castle on. Construction was completed in one phase, and most of the castle is in the same architectural style. Archaeologist David Thackray has deduced from this that Bodiam Castle was built quickly, probably because of the threat from the French. Stone castles were usually time-consuming and expensive to build, often costing thousands of pounds. Dalyngrigge was Captain of the port of Brest in France from 1386 to 1387, and as a result was probably absent for the first years of the castle's construction. It replaced the old manor house as Dalyngrigge's main residence and the administrative centre of the manor. It is not recorded when Bodiam Castle was completed, but Thackray suggests that it was before 1392; Dalyngrigge did not have long to spend in the completed castle, as he was dead by 1395.

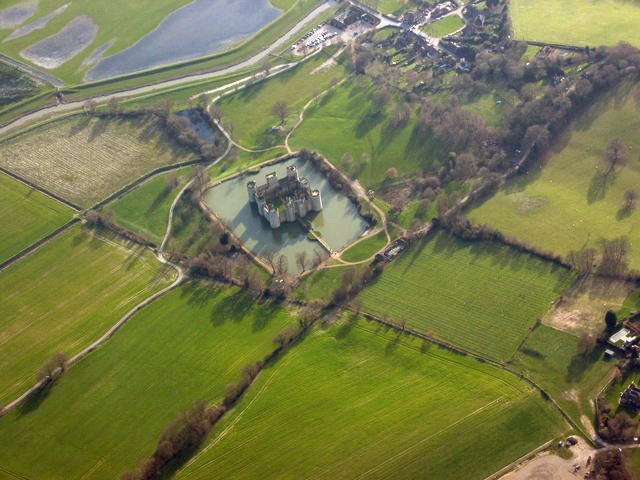
Bodiam Castle was built on a fresh site.

Danlyngrigge's estates, including the castle, were inherited by his son, John Dalyngrigge. Like his father, John enjoyed the favour of the King and was described as the "King's Knight"; in 1400 he was granted an annual allowance of 100 marks by the King. He died on 27 September 1408, leaving a will by which his property passed to his widow Alice during her lifetime. Since they had no children, at Alice's death (which occurred in 1442) it was to pass to John's cousin Richard Dallingrigge, son of Edward's brother Walter. Upon Richard's death without issue in 1470, his brother William having died before him, he left the estates to Sir Roger Lewknor, son of Richard's sister Phillippe Dallingridge. (Phillippe had married Sir Thomas Lewknor of Horsted Keynes before 1417, and died in 1421; Sir Thomas, who made a second marriage, died in 1452.) By this means, Bodiam Castle passed from the Dallingrigge into the Lewknor family.

Sir Thomas Lewknor, son of Sir Roger, was a supporter of the House of Lancaster during the Wars of the Roses, which began in 1455. When Richard of the House of York ascended to the throne as Richard III in 1483, Lewknor was accused of treason and of raising men-at-arms in southeast England. In November 1483, Lewknor's uncle and Thomas Howard, the Earl of Surrey, were given permission to levy men and besiege Bodiam Castle, where Lewknor was based. It is not recorded whether the siege went ahead, and Thackray suggests that Lewknor surrendered without much resistance. His property was confiscated, and Nicholas Rigby was made constable of the castle. On Henry VII's accession to the English throne the attainder was revoked, and Bodiam Castle was returned to Lewknor. However, not all the surrounding land was returned to the family until 1542. Possession of Bodiam Castle passed through several generations of the Lewknor family. Although the inheritance of the castle can be traced through the 16th and 17th centuries, there is little to indicate how it was used in this period, or if the family spent much time in it.

Following the death of Sir Roger Lewknor in 1543, his estates were divided among his descendants, and the castle and manor were split. John Levett of Salehurst purchased the castle in 1588. In 1623, most of the estates of Bodiam were bought by Sir Nicholas Tufton, later Earl of Thanet. His son, John Tufton, 2nd Earl of Thanet, inherited Nicholas's property on his father's death in 1631; it was John Tufton who reunited possession of castle and manor when he bought Bodiam Castle in 1639. John Tufton was a supporter of the Royalist cause during the English Civil War, and led an attack on Lewes, and was involved in a Royalist defeat at Haywards Heath. Parliament confiscated some of his lands in 1643, and more in 1644, as well as fining him £9,000 (£1,800,000 today). To help pay his fine, Tufton sold Bodiam Castle for £6,000 (£1,220,000 today) in March 1644 to Nathaniel Powell, a Parliamentarian.

== Picturesque ruins ==
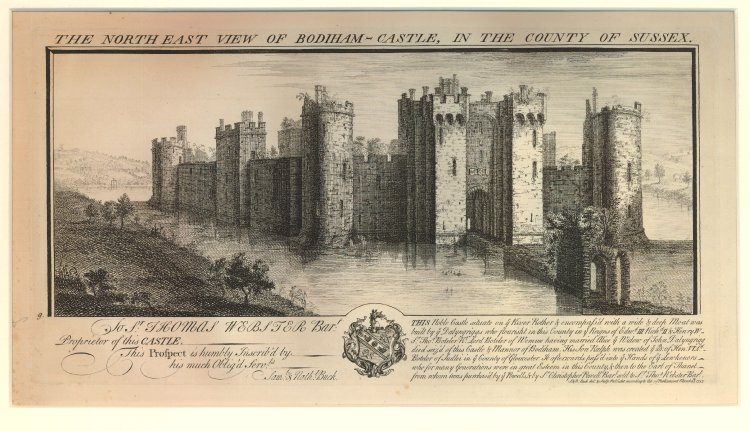
Engraving of 1737 by Samuel and Nathaniel Buck, showing Bodiam Castle from the northeast

After the Civil War, Powell was made a baronet by Charles II. Although it is unrecorded when Bodiam Castle was dismantled (slighted), it was probably after it was bought by Powell. During and after the Civil War, many castles were slighted to prevent them from being reused. Not all were destroyed completely, and in some cases care was taken not to unnecessarily deface the structure. At Bodiam, it was deemed sufficient to dismantle the barbican, the bridges, and the buildings inside the castle. When Nathaniel Powell died in 1674 or 1675, Bodiam Castle was passed on to his son, also called Nathaniel. After the second Nathaniel, the castle came into the possession of Elizabeth Clitherow, his daughter-in-law.

In 1722 Sir Thomas Webster bought the castle. For over a century, Bodiam Castle and its associated manor descended through the Webster family. It was in this period that the site became popular as an early kind of tourist attraction because of its connection with the medieval period. The first drawings of Bodiam Castle date from the mid-18th century, when it was depicted as a ruin overgrown with ivy. Ruins and medieval buildings such as Bodiam Castle served as an inspiration for the revival in Gothic architecture and the renovation of old structures.

Sir Godfrey Webster, 5th Baronet began looking for buyers for the castle in 1815, and in 1829 he finally managed to sell it and 24 acres (10 ha) of the surrounding land to John 'Mad Jack' Fuller for £3,000 (£280,000 today). Fuller repaired one of the towers, added new gates to the site, and removed a cottage which had been built within the castle in the 18th century; he is thought to have bought the castle to prevent the Webster family from dismantling it and reusing its materials. George Cubitt, later Baron Ashcombe, purchased the castle and its 24 acres (9.7 ha) from Fuller's heir in 1849, for over £5,000 (£550,000 today). Cubitt continued the renovations that Fuller started. He commissioned the first detailed survey of Bodiam Castle in 1864, and undertook repairs to the tower at the southwest corner of the site, which had almost entirely collapsed. Because there was then a fashion for ruins covered in ivy, the vegetation was not removed despite its detrimental effect on the masonry, and the trees which had taken root in the courtyard were left.

Lord Curzon decided that "so rare a treasure [as Bodiam Castle] should neither be lost to our country nor desecrated by irreverent hands". Curzon made enquiries about buying the castle, but Cubitt did not wish to sell. However, after Cubitt's death, Curzon was able to make a deal with Cubitt's son, and he bought Bodiam Castle and its lands in 1916. Curzon began a programme of investigation at Bodiam in 1919, and with architect William Weir restored parts of the castle. The moat, on average about 5 ft (1.5 m) deep but 7 ft (2.1 m) deep in the southeast corner, was drained and 3 ft (0.9 m) of mud and silt removed; during excavations the original footings of the bridges to the castle were discovered. Nearby hedges and fences were removed to provide an unobscured view of the castle. There were excavations in the interior, and a well was discovered in the basement of the southwest tower. Vegetation was cleared, stonework repaired, and the original floor level re-established throughout the castle. A cottage was built to provide a museum to display the finds from the excavations and a home for a caretaker. Bodiam Castle was given to the National Trust in 1925.

The National Trust continued the restoration work, and added new roofs to the towers and gatehouse. Excavations resumed in 1970, and the moat was once again drained. Bodiam Castle was used in Monty Python and the Holy Grail (1975) in an establishing shot identifying it as "Swamp Castle" in the "Tale of Sir Lancelot" sequence. It had previously been used for the filming of Camelot, an episode of The Goodies broadcast in 1973. It was later the filming location for the Doctor Who serial The King's Demons, broadcast in 1983, and was used again in the revived series for the 2014 episode Robot of Sherwood.

The Royal Commission on the Historical Monuments of England carried out a survey of the earthworks surrounding Bodiam Castle in 1990. In the 1990s, Bodiam Castle was at the centre of a debate in castle studies over the balance between militaristic and social interpretations of such sites. The arguments focused on elements such as the apparent strength of the defences – such as the imposing moat – and elements of display. It has been suggested that the moat could have been drained in a day because the embankment surrounding it was not substantial, and that as such it did not pose a serious obstacle to an attacker. Also, the large windows in the castle's exterior were defensive weak points. The castle is a Scheduled Monument, which means it is a "nationally important" historic building and archaeological site which has been given protection against unauthorised change. It is also a Grade I listed building, and recognised as an internationally important structure. Today the castle is open to the public, and according to figures released by the Association of Leading Visitor Attractions, nearly 175,598 people visited in 2017. In the opinion of historian Charles Coulson, Bodiam "represents the popular ideal of a medieval castle".

== Architecture ==
=== Location and landscape ===
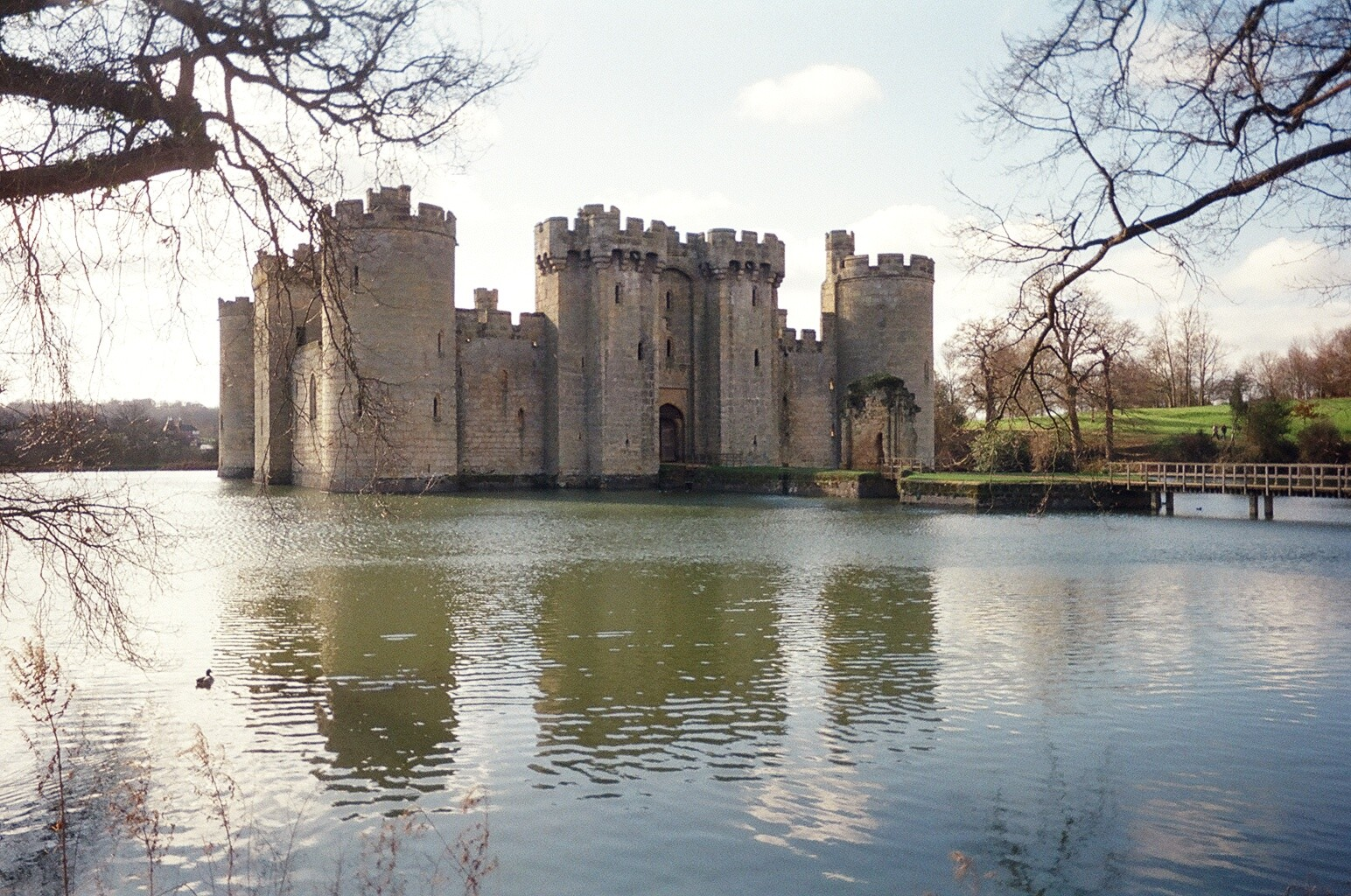
Bodiam Castle was described as "an old soldier's dream house" in the 1960s, although its defences are now considered more ornamental than practical.

The castle's location was ostensibly chosen to protect England's south coast from raids by the French. A landscape survey by the Royal Commission for Historic Monuments concluded that if this were the case, then Bodiam Castle was unusually sited, as it is far from the medieval coastline.

The area surrounding Bodiam Castle was landscaped when the castle was built, to increase its aesthetic appeal. Archaeologists Oliver Creighton and Robert Higham have described Bodiam as one of the best examples of landscaping to emphasise a castle. The water features were originally extensive, but only the moat survives, along with the earthworks left over from its construction. The moat is roughly rectangular and supplied by several springs, some of them within it, which made it difficult to drain during the excavations of the 1930s. A moat can prevent attackers from gaining access to the base of a castle's walls, but in the case of Bodiam it also had the effect of making the castle appear larger and more impressive by isolating it in its landscape. The moat is now regarded more as an ornamental feature than a defence. The approach to the castle through the moat and satellite ponds was indirect, giving visitors time to view the castle in its intended splendour. Military historian Cathcart King describes the approach as formidable, and considers it the equal of the 13th-century castles of Edward I in Wales, such as Caerphilly Castle.

The castle sits roughly in the middle of the moat. The postern gate at the rear would have been connected to the moat's south bank by a drawbridge and a long timber bridge. The main entrance on the north side of the castle is today connected to the north bank by a wooden bridge, but the original route would have included two bridges: one from the main entrance to an island in the moat, and another connecting the island to the west bank. For the most part the bridge was static, apart from the section closest to the west bank, which would have been a drawbridge. The island in the moat is called the Octagon, and excavations on it have uncovered a garderobe (toilet), suggesting that there may have been a guard on the island, although it is unclear to what extent it was fortified. The Octagon was connected to a barbican by a bridge, probably a drawbridge. The castle's 28 toilets drained directly into the moat, which in the words of archaeologist Matthew Johnson would have been effectively an "open sewer".

=== Exterior and entrance ===
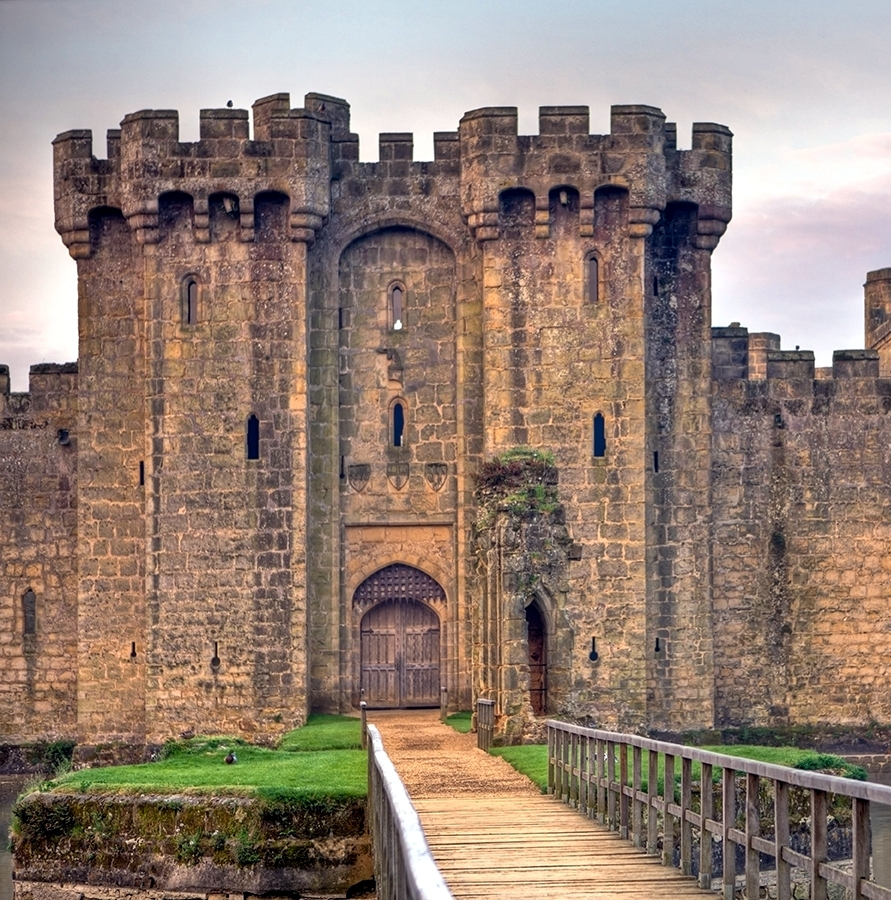
The main gatehouse of Bodiam Castle with the barbican in front and the Octagon in front of that

A quadrangular castle, Bodiam is roughly square-shaped. This type of castle, with a central courtyard and buildings against the curtain wall, was characteristic of castle architecture in the 14th century. Bodiam Castle has been described by military historian Cathcart King as the most complete surviving example of a quadrangular castle. There are circular towers at each of the four corners, with square central towers in the south, east, and west walls. The main entrance is a twin-towered gatehouse in the north face of the castle. There is a second entrance from the south; the postern gate is through a square tower in the middle of the south wall. The towers are three storeys high, taller than the curtain walls and the buildings in the castle which are two storeys high.

Between the Octagon and the main gatehouse in the north wall was a barbican, of which little survives – just a piece of the west wall – although the structure was originally two storeys high. The surviving fabric includes a slot for a portcullis for the barbican's north gate, although there are no hinges for gates. The base of a garderobe demonstrates that the second storey would have provided space for habitation, probably a guard room. Drawings from the late 18th century show the ground floor of the barbican still standing and includes detail such as vaulting inside the passageway.

The gatehouse in the castle's north wall is three storeys high; now reached by a static bridge, it was originally connected to the barbican by a drawbridge. The top of the gatehouse is machicolated, and the approach is overlooked by gun-loops in the gatehouse towers. The gatehouse is the only part of the castle which has gun-loops, and the curtain wall and towers are studded with windows for domestic use rather than military. There are guardrooms on the ground floor and a basement beneath them. The passage would originally have had three wooden portcullises. Above the entrance passage is an arch in the gateway, although it leads nowhere. The ceiling of the passage through the gatehouse into the castle is vaulted and pierced with murder holes. Murder holes were most likely used to drop objects on attackers, similar to machicolations, or to pour water to extinguish fires.

Just above the gate, there are three coats of arms carved in relief into the arch; from left to right they are the arms of the Wardeux, Dalyngrigge, and Radynden families. The Wardeux shield was for his wife Elizabeth, and the Radynden shield was for his mother Alice (one of the three daughters of John de Radynden). Above the arms is a helm bearing a unicorn head crest. Three coats of arms also decorate the postern gate; the central arms is that of Sir Robert Knolles, who Edward Dalyngrigge had fought for in the Hundred Years' War, but those flanking it are blank.

=== Interior ===
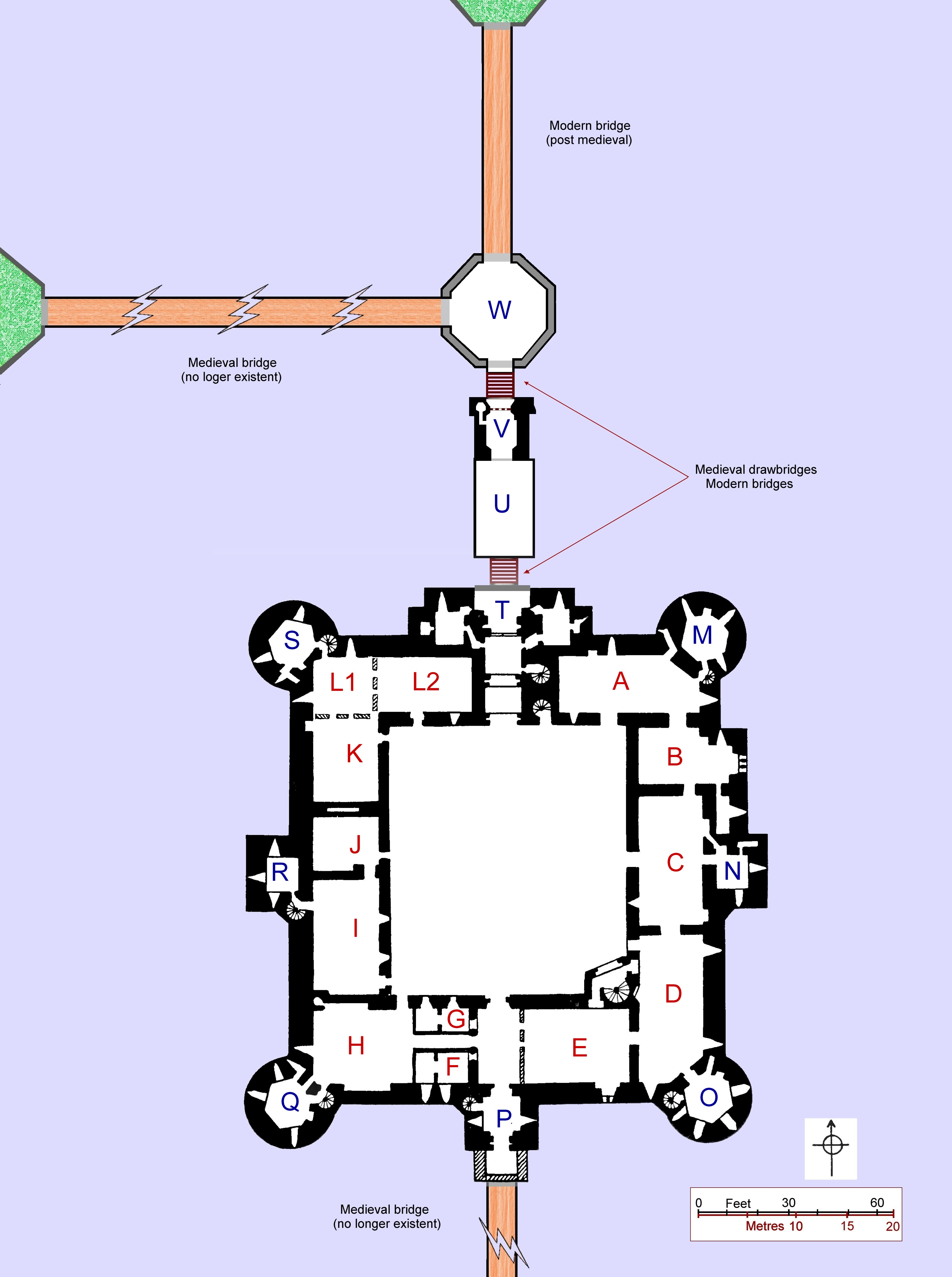
Plan of Bodiam Castle. Sections of wall that no longer stand are included: A: Household apartments; B: Chapel; C: Chamber; D: Great chamber; E: Lord's hall; F: Buttery; G: Pantry; H: Kitchen; I: Retainer's hall; J: Retainer's kitchen; K: Possible anteroom (on some plans K, L1 and L2 are shown as one room, on some two and others three); L1: Possible service rooms; L2: Possible stables; M: North-east tower; N: East tower; O: South-east tower; P: Postern tower; Q: South-west tower; R: West tower; S: North-west tower (and prison); T: Gatehouse (with guard rooms to left and right); U: Inner causeway; V: Outer barbican; W: Outer causeway

Although the exterior of Bodiam Castle has largely survived, the interior is ruinous. The domestic buildings within the castle lined the curtain walls. However, remains are substantial enough to recreate a plan of the castle. The structure was divided into separate living areas for the lord and his family, high-status guests, the garrisons, and servants. The south range of the castle consisted of the great hall, the kitchens, and associated rooms. The great hall, to the east of the centrally located postern gate, was 24 by 40 feet (7.3 by 12.2 m) and would have been as tall as the curtain wall. To the west of the great hall was the pantry and buttery, linked to the great hall by a screens passage. The three standing arches gave access to different rooms, the pantry, buttery and the kitchen which was at the far west of the south range. This layout was typical of large medieval houses. The great hall was the social centre of the castle, and where the lord would have entertained guests. The buttery and pantry occupied the bottom floor, and above was a room of unknown purpose. The buttery had a cellar and was used to store ale and wine, while the pantry held the supplies for the kitchen. To prevent heat from the cooking fires becoming unbearable, the kitchen was as tall as the curtain walls to provide a large space to absorb the heat. In the southwest tower was a well, from which water would have been drawn for the household.

Along the east wall is a chapel, a hall, and an antechamber. To accommodate the chapel, the curtain wall near the northeast corner projects 9 feet (2.7 m) further into the moat than the rest of the wall along the east side. Immediately south of the chapel was the main accommodation for the lord and his family. The buildings were two storeys high and incorporated a basement. The exact layout of the rooms is unclear.

Arranged along the west curtain wall was an extra hall and a kitchen; it is not certain what these were used for, although it is probable that these were intended to provide for the household's retainers. The "retainers' hall" had no windows on its west side and would have been relatively dark compared to the great hall. Also, whereas the great hall had a large fireplace, the "retainers' hall" had none. The hall was adjacent to the kitchen, to which it was directly connected, with no screens passage in between. Above the "retainers' hall", which was confined to the ground floor, was a room with no fireplace and of unclear purpose.

East of the main gatehouse was a two-storey building with a basement. The basement was likely used for storage while the above two floors provided accommodation. The purpose of the buildings along the west end of the north range is uncertain. The sparse arrangement, with little provision for lighting, has led to suggestions that it was used as stables, however there are no drains which are usually associated with stables. The tower in the northwest corner of the castle had a garderobe and fireplace on each of the three above-ground floors, and there was a basement underneath.

== See also ==
- Bodiam, Eastern Cape, a South African town named after the Castle
- Castles in Great Britain and Ireland
- Kenilworth Castle – an elaborate castle noteworthy for its extensive water defences
- List of castles in England
