= First International Forestry Exhibition =

The First International Forestry Exhibition was a world's fair held in 1884 was the first international gathering focusing on forestry. It was opened by the Marquess of Lothian and held in the grounds of Donaldson's College, Edinburgh, Scotland.

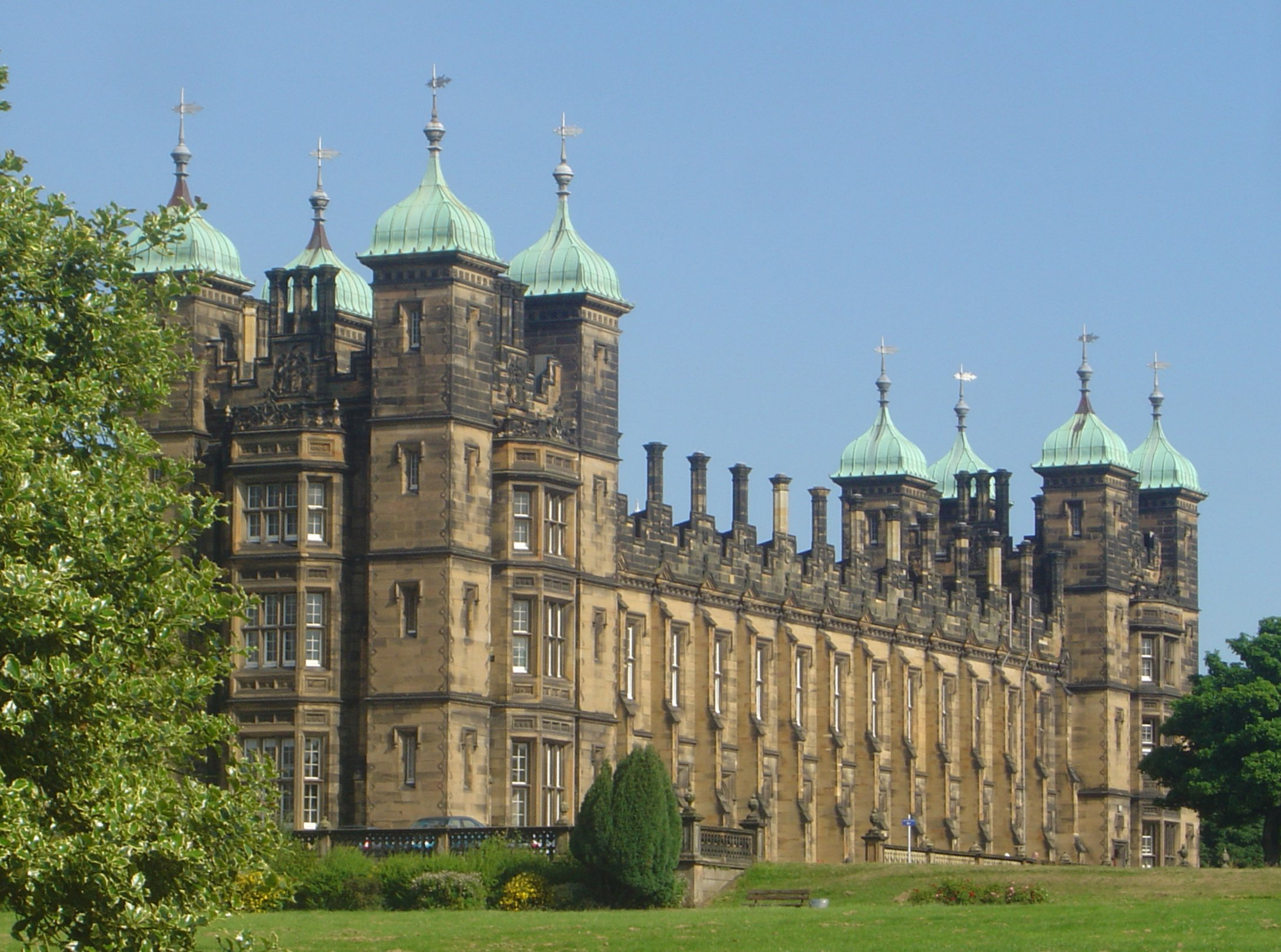
Donaldson's College

== Background ==
In the mid 19th century Britain faced reduced timber supplies from the Indian sub-continent (then British India) and had turned, under guidance from Cleghorn towards increased professionalism in forestry at home, and in India. In the late 19th century with Scotland, now established as the British centre for forestry and successful forestry education in established in Dehradun this fair was held. Countries and colonies were being invited to produce papers and exhibit products for judgment by British and Indian officials.

Participants (in addition to the India and hosts United Kingdom) included Cape Colony, India and Poland. Chile was invited but did not attend due to "an unforeseen accident".

== Exhibits ==
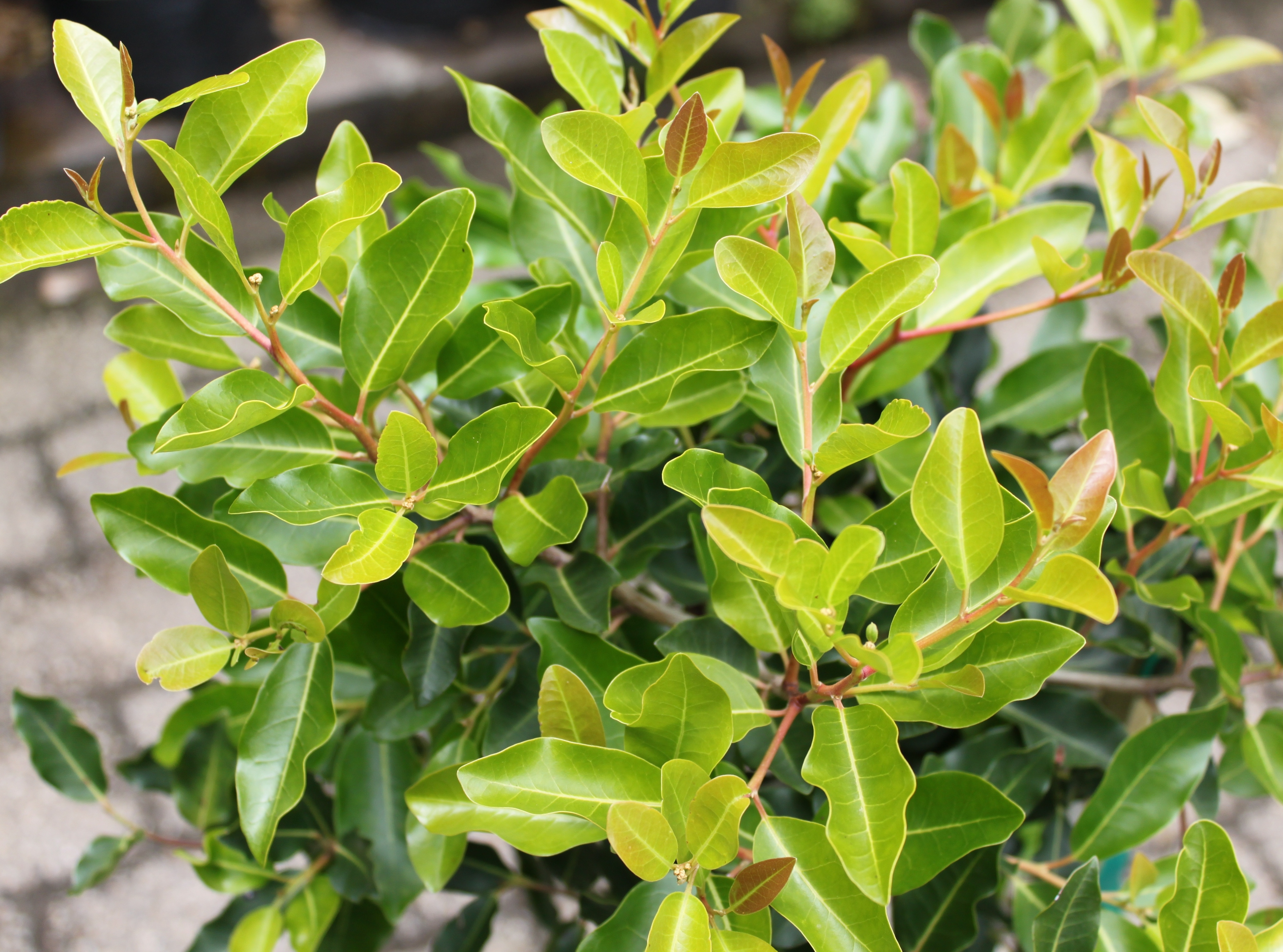
Apodytes dimidiata

Exhibits included trugs, maps and publications from participating countries, a fallen fir with heath growing on it and a fountain.

Plants exhibited included boxwood and variants, and the southern African white pear, Apodytes dimidiata (which was mislabelled as Pterocelastrus rostratus)

== Visitors ==
The, then, Prince and Princess of Wales visited on 22 or 2 August where they inspected exhibits from colonies and dependencies noting fine wood from Andaman and Nicobar.

R.A.Cross, Secretary of State for India presented wood from Malabar to the exhibition.

== Legacy ==
The wood presented by R.A.Cross (above) passed to the Department of Forestry and Natural Resources, University of Edinburgh, and then to the university's general council who used it to make their ceremonial mace's shaft.

== See also ==
- Forestry in India#History, pre-1947
- Forestry in Scotland
- International Union of Forest Research Organizations
- History of Edinburgh
