= Edward Dalyngrigge =

Member of the Parliament of England

Arms of Dalyngrygge: Argent, a cross engrailed gules

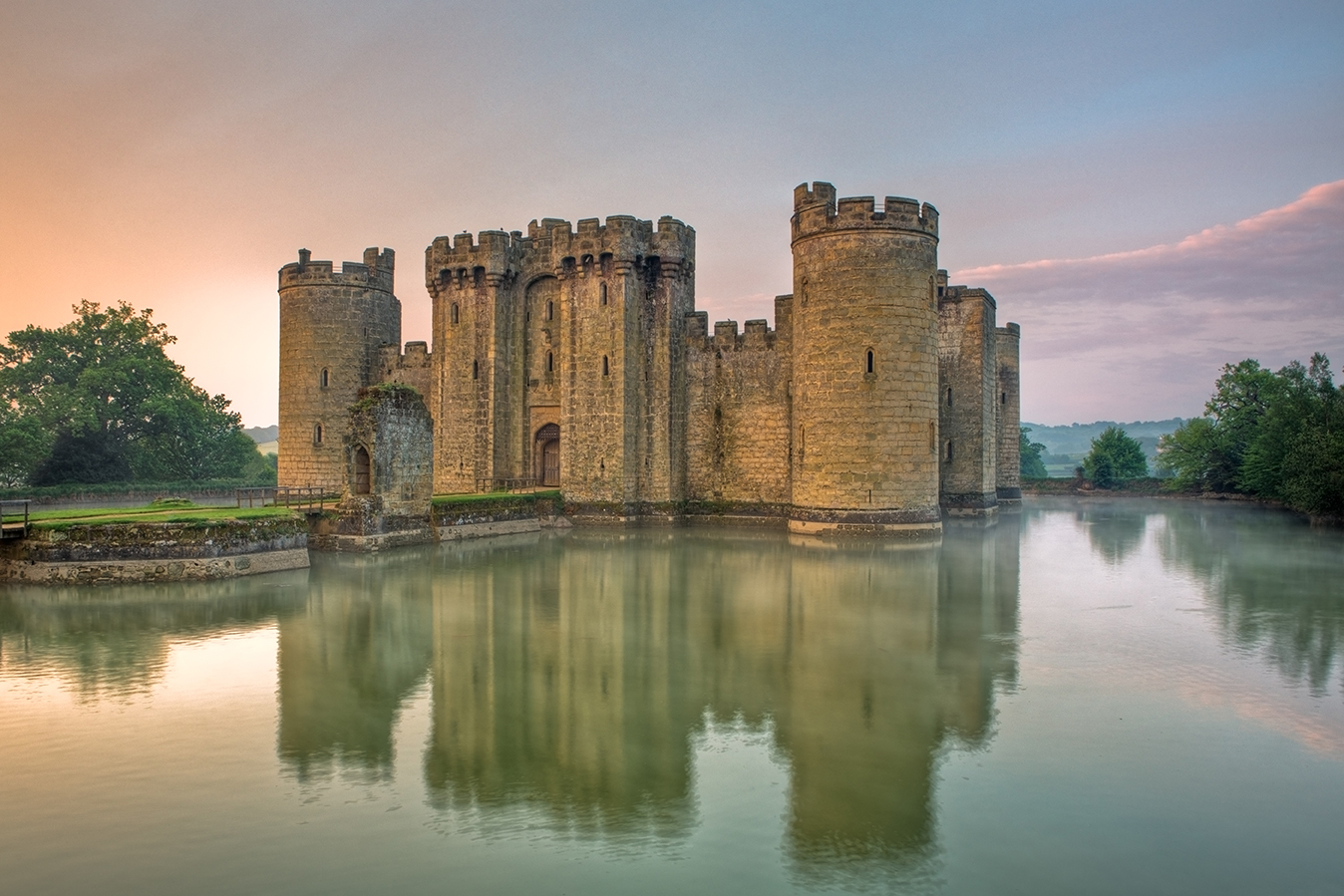
Dalyngrigge was responsible for the construction of Bodiam Castle in the late 14th century

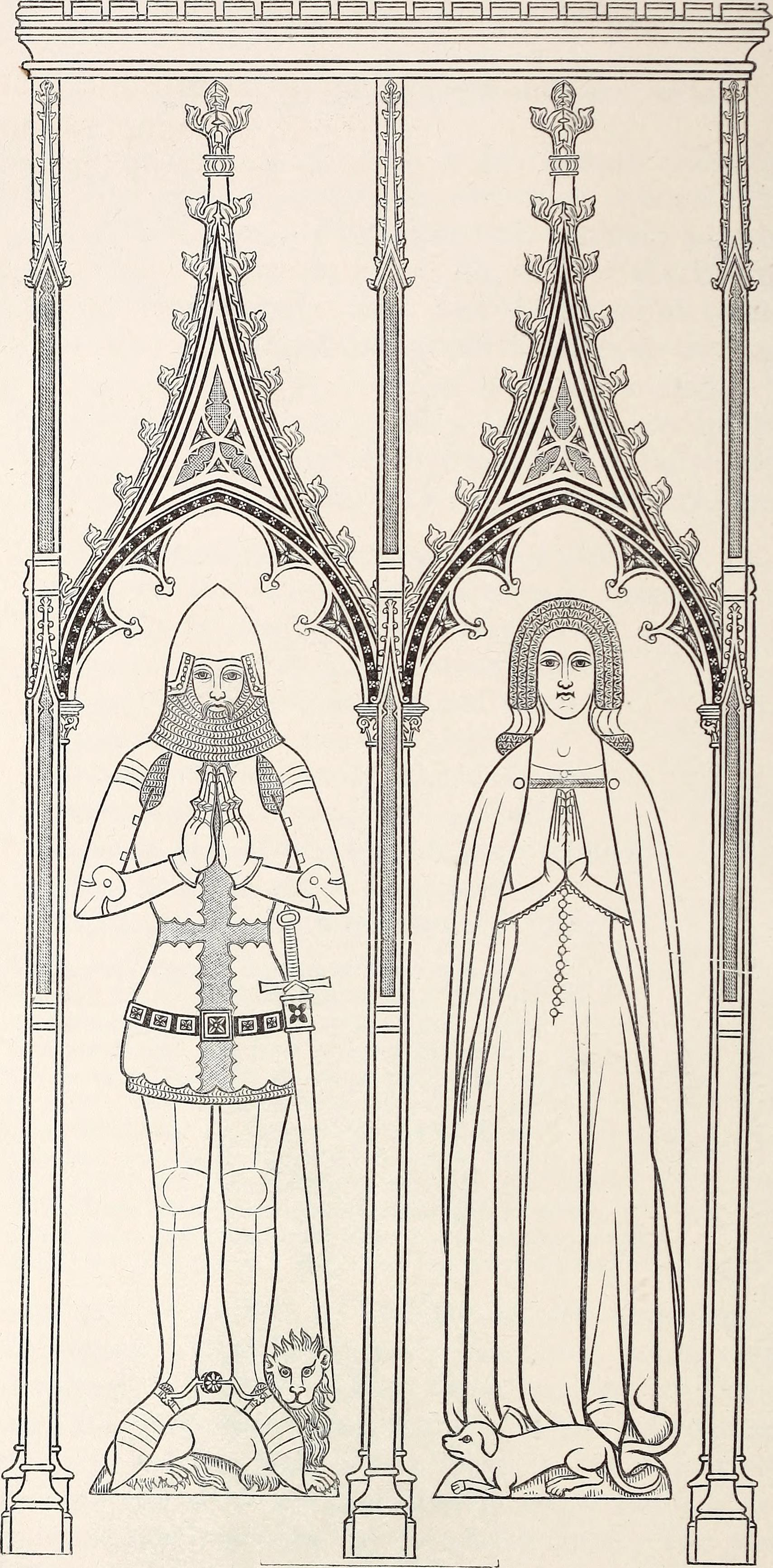
Monumental brass c.1380s, Fletching Church, Sussex, of Sir Walter Dalyngrygge, brother of Sir Edward Dalyngrigge. Arms of Dalyngrygge depicted on his tabard: Argent, a cross engrailed gules

Sir Edward Dalyngrigge, also Dallingridge or Dalyngridge (c. 1346 – 1393/94), was an English knight and politician who was a Member of Parliament and built Bodiam Castle in Sussex, England. By 1367, he had been knighted.

== Early life ==
Dalyngrigge was born c. 1346, the son of Roger Dalyngrigge and Alice Radingden, his wife. The family first gained land in Sussex, the manor of Bolebrook, through the marriage of Roger's father, John Dalyngrigge, to Joan, daughter of Walter de la Lynde, of Lincolnshire, and extended their holdings through subsequent generations. The family originated from the area of Dalling Ridge near East Grinstead.

== Career ==
Dalyngrigge travelled to France in 1367 and joined the free company of Sir Robert Knolles, fighting as a mercenary. Dalyngrigge returned to England in 1377 having accumulated much wealth and power.

Upon his return to Sussex, he married Elizabeth, the heiress of the Wardedieu or Wardeux family, who had held the manor of Bodiam since before 1330. Through his new wife, he acquired a moated manor house, which lay just to the north of Bodiam church. It is also possible that Dalyngrigge and his new wife resided in the manor house until his new castle was completed although he also held another house at his estate at Bolebrook, near Hartfield, Sussex.

== Knighthood ==
Between 1379 and 1388, Dalyngrigge was Knight of the Shire of Sussex in ten parliaments and subsequently one of the most influential gentry of the county at that time. In 1380, he was made a member of the Commission considering the state of the realm and the possessions, expenses and revenues of the royal household. Also in that year, he was appointed to survey Winchelsea and to consider how the town should be fortified against attacks from the French. His concern over the defence of the coast was evident in 1384-85, when he was called to be a member of a Commission to fortify the cinque port, Rye, East Sussex.

In 1384, the King's uncle, John of Gaunt, Duke of Lancaster, took out a lawsuit against Dalyngrigge to try to restrain him from interference with the Duke's recently acquired Sussex estates. Resentment of the powerful Duke of Lancaster and his estates was felt by many of the Sussex gentry, and Dalyngrigge was essentially representing their grievances.

Dalyngrigge's behaviour in court, where he appeared in his own defence, was violent and unruly and gives a good indication of his personality; twice during the proceedings, he threw down the gauntlet in court. His action seems to imply that he saw the case more as a matter of honour than of legality. His concern was fundamentally that his local standing was threatened by John of Gaunt's acquisition and authority over neighbouring estates. John of Gaunt won his lawsuit and Dalyngrigge suffered an almost £1000 fine for contempt and was ordered to be kept in 'safe and secure custody' of the sheriff until paid.

Sir Edward's patron, the 11th Earl of Arundel, was able to intercede for him with the King after the Duke had departed England on 9 July 1386 when he sailed his army to Brest and on to Corunna and so Dalyngrigge was returned to the Parliament soon after without ever paying the fine.

England had been at war with France on-and-off since the 1330s when King Edward III laid claim to the French throne. Due to a number of attacks by the French on towns on the southern English coast, there was a good reason for building a well-defended castle close to the south coast. At the time, the River Rother was still navigable as far as Bodiam and the French could easily have sailed an invading or raiding force there. Consequently, King Richard II issued a royal licence to Dalyngrigge in October 1385 to crenellate his manor house at Bodiam. The licence, in Latin, stated:

...that he may strengthen with a wall of stone and lime, and crenellate and may construct and make into a Castle his manor house of Bodyham, near the sea, in the county of Sussex, for the defence of the adjacent country, and the resistance of our enemies.

In addition to the licence to crenellate, Sir Edward was granted a royal licence to divert a stream from "Dalyngreggesbay", upstream in Salehurst, to Bodiam to power a watermill. The mill was situated to the south of the site for Sir Edward's new castle between the castle and the River Rother, fed by a large mill-pond.

In 1386-87, Sir Edward was appointed Captain of Brest, and due to his having to spend his time in France is unlikely to have been present to oversee the first stages of his new castle.

By 1390, the threat of war with France had receded. Sir Edward was appointed to several commissions, such as to conclude a truce with France, to make conditions with the Count of Flanders and with the people of Ghent, Bruges and Ypres, and to survey the castles and fortresses of Calais and Picardy.

In 1390, he was one of the nine knights who attached their seal to a letter sent to the Pope deploring the excesses of the Church. Sir Edward's status in the country was further reflected in 1392 when he was appointed as Warden of London by King Richard II when civic liberties were suspended from May to September of that year.

By the time his castle at Bodiam was completed in about 1390, Dalyngrigge did not have long to enjoy it, as he died some time between July 1393 and August 1394.

He was succeeded by his son, Sir John Dalyngrigge, who was married to Alice, daughter and heir of Sir John Beauchamp of Powick, and relict of Sir Thomas Butler of Sudeley, Gloucestershire.

== In fiction ==
A fictionalized version of Edward Dalyngrigg is the main character in The Scourge trilogy, by Roberto Calas.

== Sources ==
- Thackray, David (2004) [1991], Bodiam Castle, The National Trust, ISBN 978-1-84359-090-3
