= Sussex trug =

Wooden basket

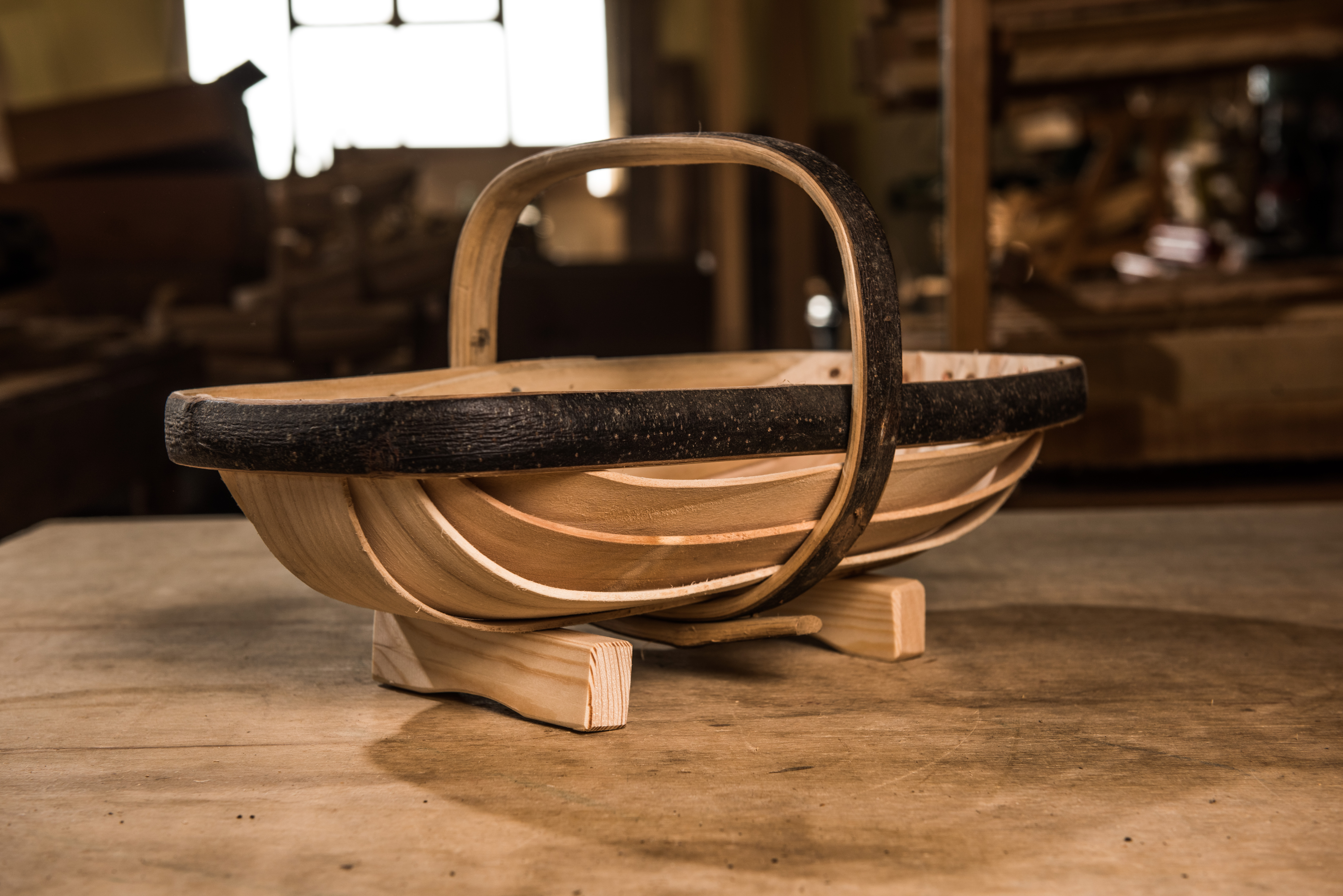
A Sussex trug

A Sussex trug is a wooden basket. It is made from a handle and rim of coppiced sweet chestnut wood which is hand-cleft then shaved using a drawknife. The body of the trug is made of five or seven thin boards of white willow, also hand-shaved with a drawknife. They may have originated in Sussex because of the abundance of chestnut coppice and willows found on the marshes. Nails or pins used are usually copper, to avoid rust.

Shapes and sizes became standardised, the most well-known shape being the "common or garden" trug ranging in volume from one pint to a bushel. However, there is a diverse range of traditional trugs from garden and oval trugs to the more specialised "large log" and "walking stick" trugs.

== History ==
Seaford, Sussex by William Collins, 1844, with a Sussex trug visible on the left.

The trug industry is believed to date from the 1500s with active trade in Horsham, although Richard Acres of Rotherfield in Sussex is recorded as a trug maker in a 1485 document.

Thomas Smith of Herstmonceux, displaying his trugs at the Great Exhibition of 1851, giving the basket wider renown: he was rewarded when Queen Victoria purchased several for members of the royal family. Further appearances at international exhibitions followed at the 1855 Universal exhibition in Paris; the First International Forestry Exhibition in Edinburgh 1884; and the International Inventions Exhibition in London.

By the 1970s, Herstmonceux remained as a significant centre of trug production, with four firms operating in or near that village: Greens of Hailsham, R. Reed, R.W. Rich and Sons, and Thomas Smith and Sons.
