= Herstmonceux =

Village and parish in East Sussex, England

Coordinates: 50.89°N 0.32°E

- Village
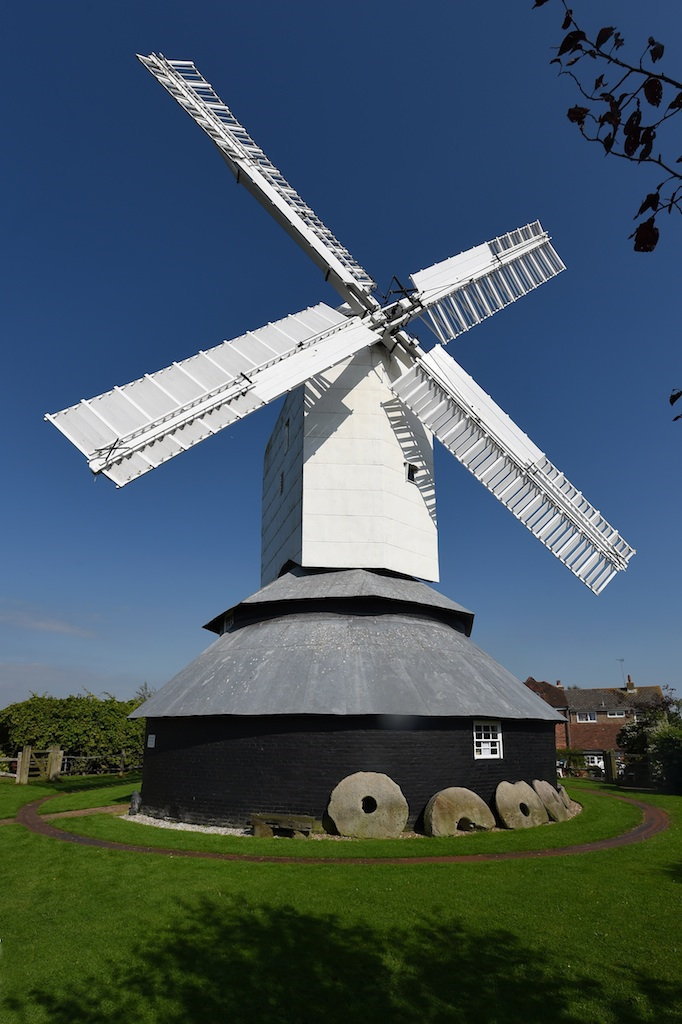
- Windmill Hill Mill, Herstmonceux

- Location within East Sussex
- Area: 24.7 km^{2} (9.5 sq mi)
- Population: 2,613 (2011)
  - Density: 273/sq mi (105/km^{2})
- OS grid reference: TQ635125
  - London: 45 miles (72 km) N
- Civil parish: Herstmonceux
- District: Wealden
- Shire county: East Sussex
- Region: South East
- Country: England
- Sovereign state: United Kingdom
- Post town: HAILSHAM
- Postcode district: BN27
- Dialling code: 01323
- Police: Sussex
- Fire: East Sussex
- Ambulance: South East Coast
- UK Parliament: Bexhill and Battle
- Website: Herstmonceux Parish

Herstmonceux (/ˌhɜːrsmənˈzuː/ HURSS-mən-ZOO, /-ˈsuː/ -SOO, or /hɔːrsˈmaʊnsiːz/ horss-MOWN-seez) is a village and civil parish in the Wealden district of East Sussex, England, which includes Herstmonceux Castle. In 2011 the parish had a population of 2613.

The Herstmonceux Medieval Festival is held annually in August.

== History ==
The name comes from Anglo-Saxon hyrst, "wooded hill", plus the name of the Monceux family who were lords of the manor in the 12th century. In 1086, the manor, simply called Herste, was in the ancient hundred of Foxearle.

In 1677, Thomas Lennard, 1st Earl of Sussex, was paid £3 when he went to a cricket match played at "ye Dicker", a common near Herstmonceux, one of the earliest references to the sport.

The Herstmonceux area is known for the making of trugs, baskets made from split willow boards set in an ash or chestnut frame. A number of local people continue this tradition.

== Governance ==
The parish council consists of eleven elected members. An electoral ward of the same name exists. This ward had a population at the 2011 census of 2,852.

Education is provided at Herstmonceux Church of England Primary School.

== Geography ==
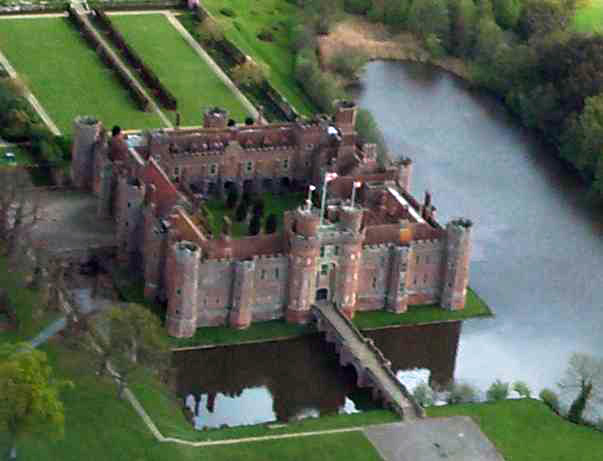
Herstmonceux Castle from the air

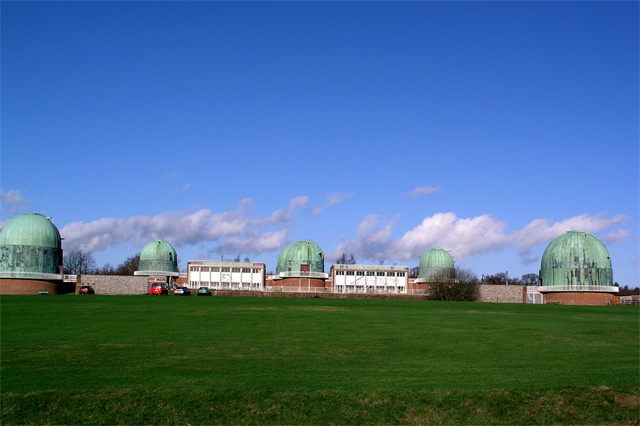
The former buildings and telescopes of the Royal Greenwich Observatory at Herstmonceux

The village (previously called Gardner Street) is part of the larger Herstmonceux civil parish, which includes Cowbeech and the hamlets of Foul Mile, Trolliloes, Cowbeech Hill, Stunts Green, Ginger's Green, Flowers Green and part of Windmill Hill where the Windmill Hill Windmill is situated. Cowbeech village is north-west of the parish. Eastbourne is 7 miles (11 km) south-west of the village, and Brighton and Hove 21 miles (34 km) south-west.

Herstmonceux Castle, two miles (3.2 km) south-east of the village, is a former site of the Royal Observatory, Greenwich. It is now home to the Bader International Study Centre of Queen's University, Kingston, Canada, and the area therefore enjoys an influx of Canadian and other international students each school year. The castle grounds are also home to the Observatory Science Centre and the Herstmonceux Mediaeval Festival. Buckwell Place was the seat of the Hare family.

There are two Sites of Special Scientific Interest within the parish. Herstmonceux Park is of importance because of its wetland habitat and fen vegetation. It is the only known location of Milk Parsley (Peucedanum palustre) in the south-east. The second site, Pevensey Levels, lies partially in the parish. The site is of biological interest consisting of low-lying grazing meadows, hosting a wide variety of wetland flora and fauna.

=== Climate ===
Climate data for Herstmonceux, West End (1991–2020 normals)
Month	Jan	Feb	Mar	Apr	May	Jun	Jul	Aug	Sep	Oct	Nov	Dec	Year
Record high °C (°F)	15.5 (59.9)	18.3 (64.9)	20.8 (69.4)	26.5 (79.7)	31.5 (88.7)	35.0 (95.0)	38.1 (100.6)	34.5 (94.1)	31.2 (88.2)	26.5 (79.7)	18.1 (64.6)	14.9 (58.8)	38.1 (100.6)
Mean daily maximum °C (°F)	7.9 (46.2)	8.3 (46.9)	10.8 (51.4)	13.9 (57.0)	16.9 (62.4)	19.5 (67.1)	21.6 (70.9)	21.7 (71.1)	19.1 (66.4)	15.3 (59.5)	11.4 (52.5)	8.6 (47.5)	14.6 (58.3)
Daily mean °C (°F)	5.2 (41.4)	5.2 (41.4)	7.3 (45.1)	9.6 (49.3)	12.6 (54.7)	15.2 (59.4)	17.3 (63.1)	17.4 (63.3)	15.0 (59.0)	11.8 (53.2)	8.3 (46.9)	5.7 (42.3)	10.9 (51.6)
Mean daily minimum °C (°F)	2.4 (36.3)	2.2 (36.0)	3.7 (38.7)	5.4 (41.7)	8.3 (46.9)	10.9 (51.6)	13.0 (55.4)	13.0 (55.4)	10.9 (51.6)	8.3 (46.9)	5.2 (41.4)	2.9 (37.2)	7.2 (45.0)
Record low °C (°F)	−8.9 (16.0)	−1.6 (29.1)	−5.4 (22.3)	−3.5 (25.7)	−0.4 (31.3)	3.8 (38.8)	4.9 (40.8)	5.9 (42.6)	2.5 (36.5)	−2.3 (27.9)	−4.5 (23.9)	−9.8 (14.4)	−9.8 (14.4)
Average precipitation mm (inches)	90.9 (3.58)	63.8 (2.51)	51.6 (2.03)	50.1 (1.97)	50.1 (1.97)	55.2 (2.17)	59.0 (2.32)	69.4 (2.73)	64.1 (2.52)	100.1 (3.94)	106.4 (4.19)	103.1 (4.06)	863.7 (34.00)
Average precipitation days (≥ 1.0 mm)	13.4	10.8	9.5	8.7	8.5	7.8	8.1	9.2	9.3	12.5	13.6	13.7	125.0
Mean monthly sunshine hours	60.1	80.0	131.8	188.8	223.0	227.6	233.5	210.0	159.7	114.6	66.3	52.7	1,748
Source 1: Met Office
Source 2: Starlings Roost Weather

== Religion ==
All Saints' (Church of England) parish church, with its 12th-century west tower and 13th/14th century nave, overlooks the Castle. Herstmonceux Congregational Church, just outside the village on the way to the castle, was erected in 1811 and is now a listed building.

== Twinning ==
The village is twinned with Varengeville-sur-Mer, in Normandy, France.

== See also ==
Listed buildings in Herstmonceux
