= English folk music =

Folk music originating in England

Howie Mitchell performing Matty Groves

The folk music of England is a tradition-based music which has existed since the later medieval period. It is often contrasted with courtly, classical and later commercial music. Folk music traditionally was preserved and passed on orally within communities, but print and subsequently audio recordings have since become the primary means of transmission. The term is used to refer both to English traditional music and music composed or delivered in a traditional style.

There are distinct regional and local variations in content and style, particularly in areas more removed from the most prominent English cities, as in Northumbria, or the West Country. Cultural interchange and processes of migration mean that English folk music, although in many ways distinctive, has significant crossovers with the music of Scotland. When English communities migrated to the United States, Canada and Australia, they brought their folk traditions with them, and many of the songs were preserved by immigrant communities.

English folk music has produced or contributed to several cultural phenomena, including sea shanties, jigs, hornpipes and the music for Morris dancing. It has also interacted with other musical traditions, particularly classical and rock music, influencing musical styles and producing musical fusions, such as British folk rock, folk punk and folk metal. There remains a flourishing sub-culture of English folk music, which continues to influence other genres and occasionally gains mainstream attention.

== History ==
=== Origins ===
In the strictest sense, English folk music has existed since the arrival of the Anglo-Saxon people in Britain after 400 AD. The Venerable Bede's story of the cattleman and later ecclesiastical musician Cædmon indicates that in the early medieval period it was normal at feasts to pass around the harp and sing 'vain and idle songs'. Since this type of music was rarely notated, we have little knowledge of its form or content. Some later tunes, like those used for Morris dance, may have their origins in this period, but it is impossible to be certain of these relationships. We know from a reference in William Langland's Piers Plowman, that ballads about Robin Hood were being sung from at least the late 14th century and the oldest detailed material we have is Wynkyn de Worde's collection of Robin Hood ballads printed about 1495.

=== 16th century to the 18th century ===
While there was distinct court music, members of the social elite into the 16th century also seem to have enjoyed, and even to have contributed to the music of the people, as Henry VIII perhaps did with the tavern song "Pastime with Good Company". Peter Burke argued that late medieval social elites had their own culture, but were culturally 'amphibious', able to participate in and affect popular traditions.

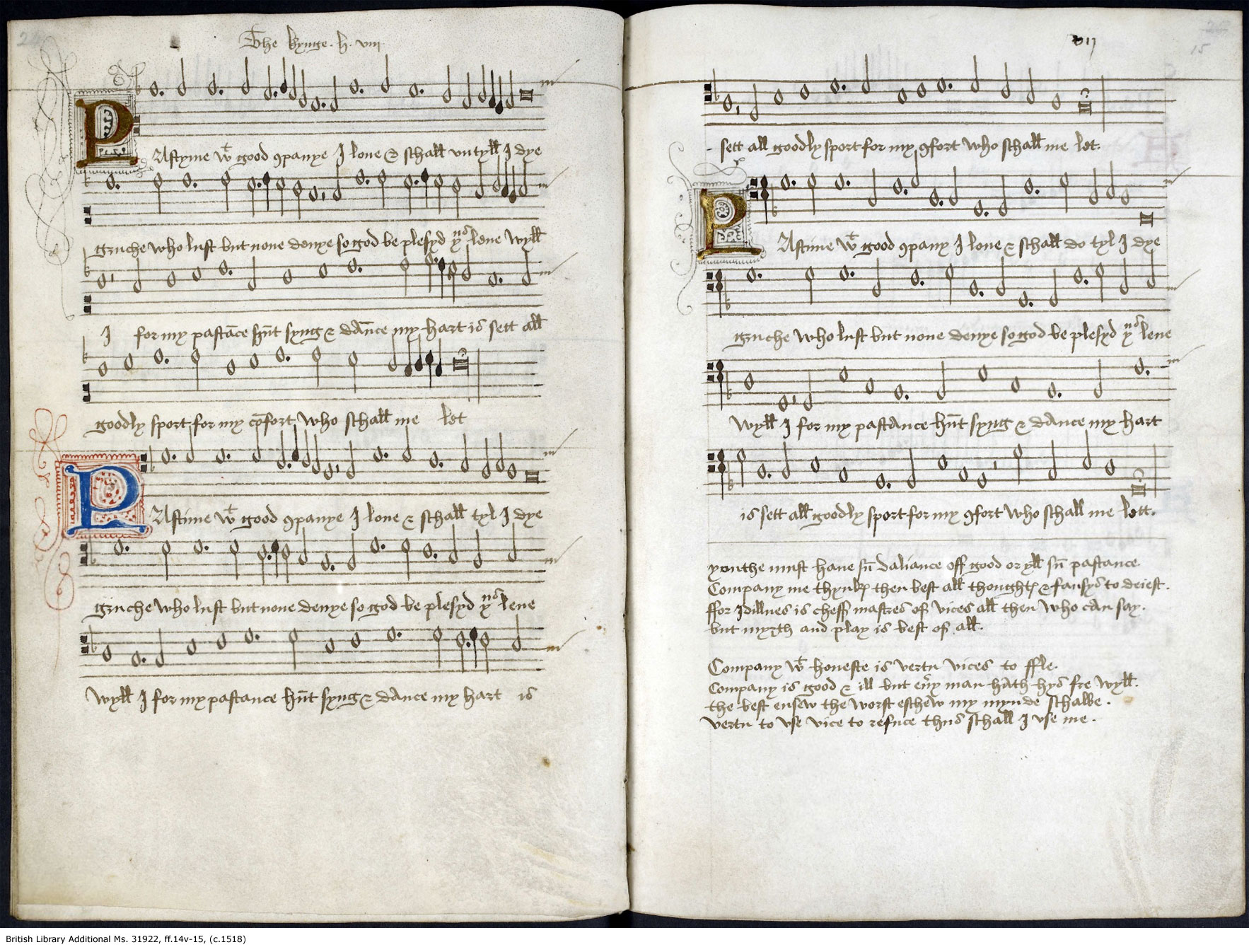
Original score of Pastime with Good Company (c. 1513), held in the British Library, London.

In the 16th century the changes in the wealth and culture of the upper social orders caused tastes in music to diverge. There was an internationalisation of courtly music in terms of both instruments, such as the lute, dulcimer and early forms of the harpsichord, and in form with the development of madrigals, pavanes and galliards. For other social orders, instruments like the pipe, tabor, bagpipe, shawm, hurdy-gurdy, and crumhorn accompanied traditional music and community dance. The fiddle, well established in England by the 1660s, was unusual in being a key element in both the art music that developed in the baroque, and in popular song and dance.

Vihuela sample
A vihuela playing 'Jamaica' from Playford's 4th edition of The English Dancing Master

By the mid-17th century, the music of the lower social orders was sufficiently alien to the aristocracy and "middling sort" for a process of rediscovery to be needed in order to understand it, along with other aspects of popular culture such as festivals, folklore and dance. This led to a number of early collections of printed material, including those published by John Playford as The English Dancing Master (1651), and the private collections of Samuel Pepys (1633–1703) and the Roxburghe Ballads collected by Robert Harley, 1st Earl of Oxford and Mortimer (1661–1724). Pepys notably mentioned in his famous diary singing the ballad Barbara Allen on New Year's Eve, 1665, a ballad that survived in the oral tradition well into the twentieth century. In the 18th century there were increasing numbers of collections of what was now beginning to be defined as "folk" music, strongly influenced by the Romantic movement, including Thomas D'Urfey's Wit and Mirth: or, Pills to Purge Melancholy (1719–20) and Bishop Thomas Percy's Reliques of Ancient English Poetry (1765). The last of these also contained some oral material and by the end of the 18th century this was becoming increasingly common, with collections including Joseph Ritson's, The Bishopric Garland (1784), which paralleled the work of figures like Robert Burns and Walter Scott in Scotland.

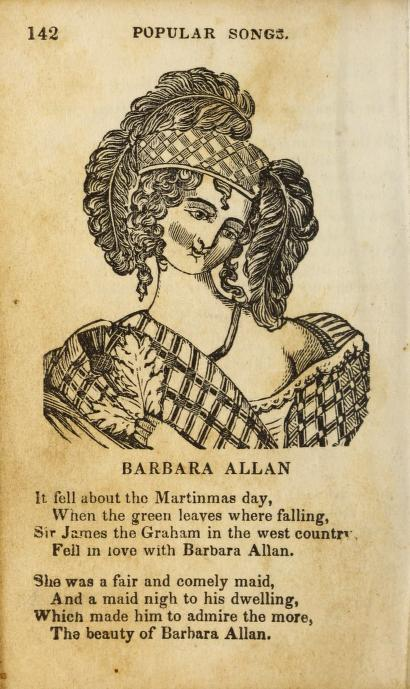
The first page of an 1840 printed version of "Barbara Allen" one of the most widely collected English language folk ballads.

It was in this period, too, that English folk music traveled across the Atlantic Ocean and became one of the foundations of American traditional music. In the colonies, it mixed with styles of music brought by other immigrant groups to create a host of new genres. For instance, English ballads, along with Irish, Scottish, and German musical traditions when combined with the African banjo, Afro-American rhythmic traditions and the Afro-American jazz and blues aesthetic led in part to the development of bluegrass and country music.

=== Early 19th century ===
With the Industrial Revolution the themes of the music of the labouring classes began to change from rural and agrarian life to include industrial work songs. Awareness that older kinds of song were being abandoned prompted renewed interest in collecting folk songs during the 1830s and 1840s, including the work of William Sandys' Christmas Carols Ancient and Modern (1833), William Chappell, A Collection of National English Airs (1838) and Robert Bell's Ancient Poems, Ballads and Songs of the Peasantry of England (1846).

Technological change made new instruments available and led to the development of silver and brass bands, particularly in industrial centres in the north. The shift to urban centres also began to create new types of music, including from the 1850s the Music hall, which developed from performances in ale houses into theatres and became the dominant locus of English popular music for over a century. This combined with increased literacy and print to allow the creation of new songs that initially built on, but began to differ from traditional music as composers like Lionel Monckton and Sidney Jones created music that reflected new social circumstances.

=== Folk revivals 1890–1969 ===
From the late 19th century there were a series of movements that attempted to collect, record, preserve and later to perform, English folk music and dance. These are usually separated into two folk revivals.

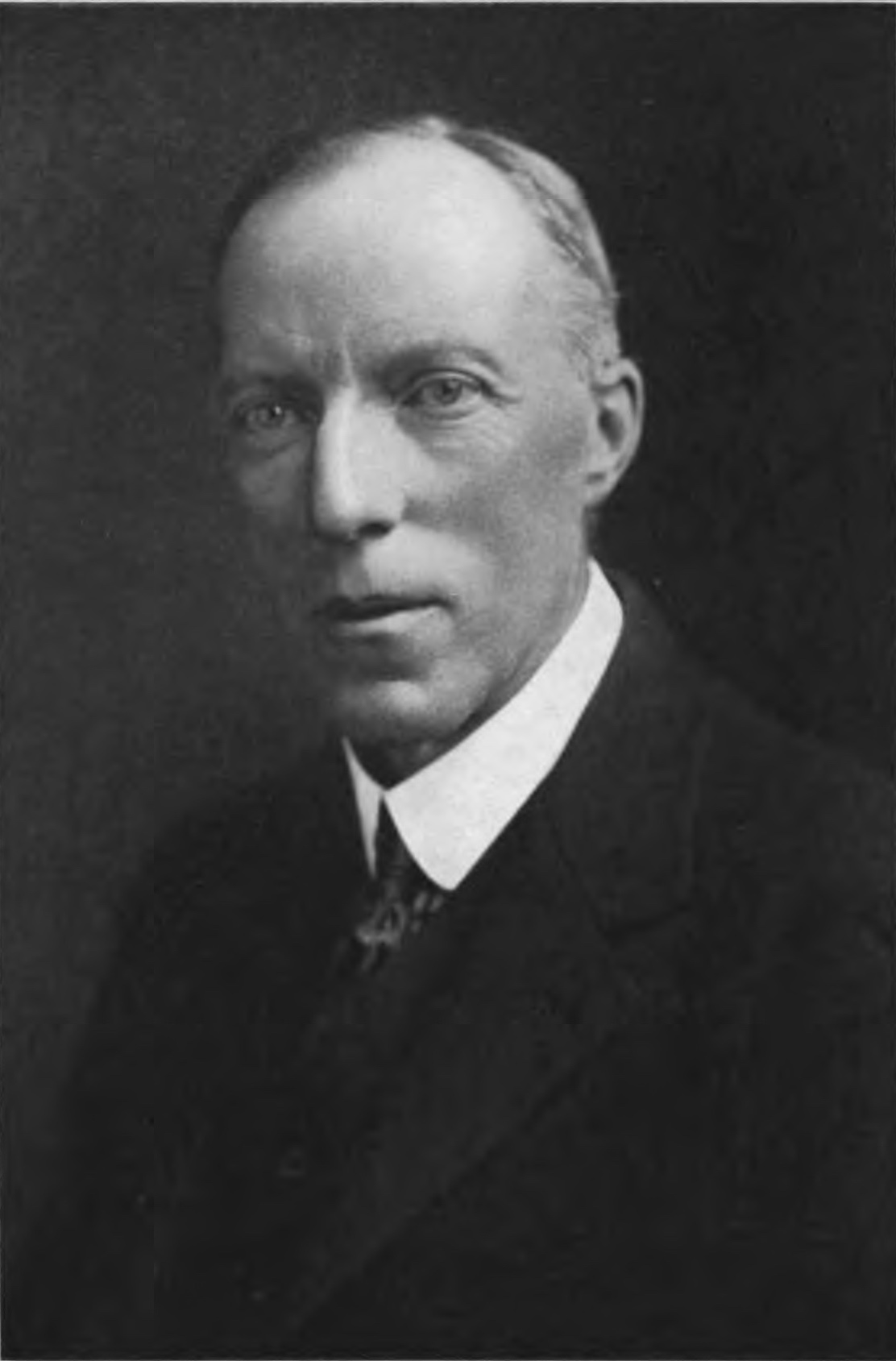
Cecil Sharp

The first, in the later 19th and early 20th centuries, involved figures including collectors Sabine Baring-Gould (1834–1924), Frank Kidson (1855–1926), Lucy Broadwood (1858–1939), and Anne Gilchrist (1863–1954), centred around the Folk Song Society, founded in 1911. Francis James Child's (1825–96) eight-volume collection The English and Scottish Popular Ballads (1882–92) became the most influential in defining the repertoire of subsequent performers, and Cecil Sharp (1859–1924), founder of the English Folk Dance Society, was probably the most important figure in understanding of the nature of folk song. The revival was part of a wider national movement in the period around the First World War, and contributed to the creation of the English Pastoral School of classical music which incorporated traditional songs or motifs, as can be seen in the compositions of Percy Grainger (1882–1961), Ralph Vaughan Williams (1872–1951), George Butterworth (1885–1916), Gustav Holst (1874–1934) and Frederick Delius (1862–1934). In 1932 the Folk-Song Society and the English Folk Dance Society merged to become the English Folk Dance and Song Society (EFDSS). Some of these revivalists recorded folk songs on wax cylinders, and many of the recordings, including Percy Grainger's collection, are available online courtesy of the Vaughan Williams Memorial Library and the British Library Sound Archive. The second revival gained momentum after the Second World War, following on from the American folk music revival as new forms of media and American commercial music appeared to pose another threat to traditional music. The key figures were Ewan MacColl and A. L. Lloyd. The second revival was generally left wing in politics and emphasised the work music of the 19th century and previously neglected forms like erotic folk songs. Topic Records, founded in 1939, provided a major source of folk recordings. The revival resulted in the foundation of a network of folk clubs in major towns, from the 1950s. Major traditional performers included The Watersons, the Ian Campbell Folk Group, and Shirley Collins. The fusing of various styles of American music with English folk also helped to create a distinctive form of guitar fingerstyle known as 'folk baroque', which was pioneered by Davy Graham, Martin Carthy, John Renbourn and Bert Jansch. Several individuals emerged who had learnt the old songs in the oral tradition from their communities and therefore preserved the authentic versions. These people, including Sam Larner, Harry Cox, Fred Jordan, Walter Pardon, Frank Hinchliffe and the Copper Family, released albums of their own and were revered by folk revivalists. Popular folk revival musicians based their works on songs sung by these traditional singers and those collected during the first folk revival.

There are various databases and collections of English folk songs collected during the first and second folk revivals, such as the Roud Folk Song Index, which contains references to 25,000 English language folk songs, and the Vaughan Williams Memorial Library, a multimedia archive of folk-related resources. The British Library Sound Archive contains thousands of recordings of traditional English folk music, including 340 wax cylinder recordings made by Percy Grainger in the early 1900s.

=== Progressive folk ===
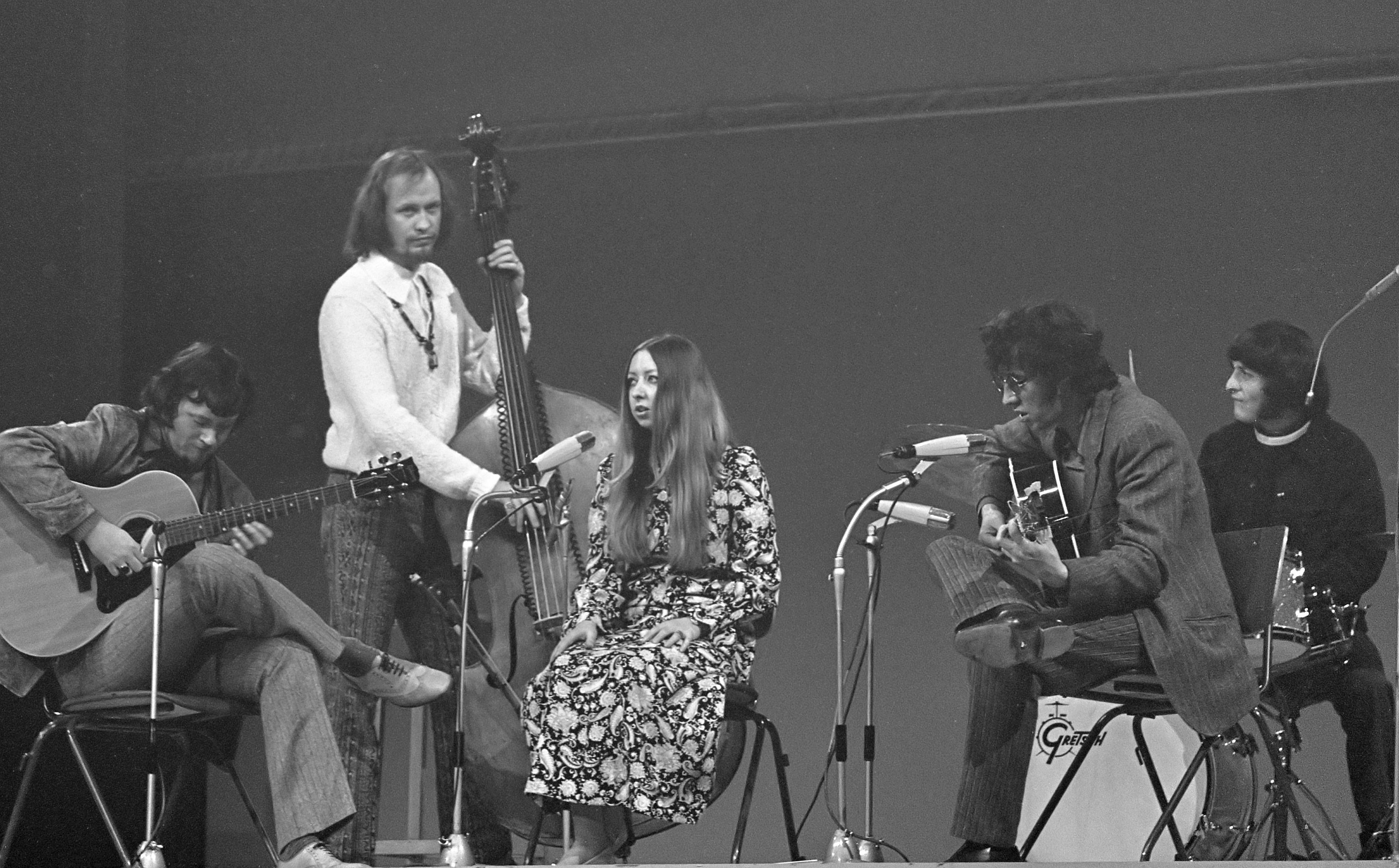
Pentangle performing in 1969

The process of fusion between American musical styles and English folk can also be seen as the origin of British progressive folk music, which attempted to elevate folk music through greater musicianship, or compositional and arrangement skills. Many progressive folk performers continued to retain a traditional element in their music, including Jansch and Renbourn, who with Jacqui McShee, Danny Thompson, and Terry Cox, formed Pentangle in 1967. Others totally abandoned the traditional element and in this area particularly influential were the Scottish artists Donovan, who was most influenced by emerging progressive folk musicians in America like Bob Dylan, and the Incredible String Band, who from 1967 incorporated a range of influences including medieval and eastern music into their compositions. Some of this, particularly the Incredible String Band, has been seen as developing into the further subgenre of psych or psychedelic folk and had a considerable impact on progressive and psychedelic rock.

There was a brief flowering of English progressive folk in the late 1960s and early 1970s, with groups like the Third Ear Band and Quintessence following the eastern Indian musical and more abstract work by group such as Comus, Dando Shaft, The Trees, Spirogyra, Forest, and Jan Dukes De Grey, but commercial success was elusive for these bands and most had broken up or moved in very different directions by about 1973. Perhaps the finest individual work in the genre was from artists early 1970s artists like Nick Drake and John Martyn, but these can also be considered the first among the English 'folk troubadours' or 'singer-songwriters', individual performers who remained largely acoustic but who relied mostly on their own individual compositions. The most successful of these was Ralph McTell, whose 'Streets of London' reached number 2 in the UK Single Charts in 1974, and whose music is clearly folk, but without much reliance on tradition, virtuosity, or much evidence of attempts at fusion with other genres.

=== British folk rock ===
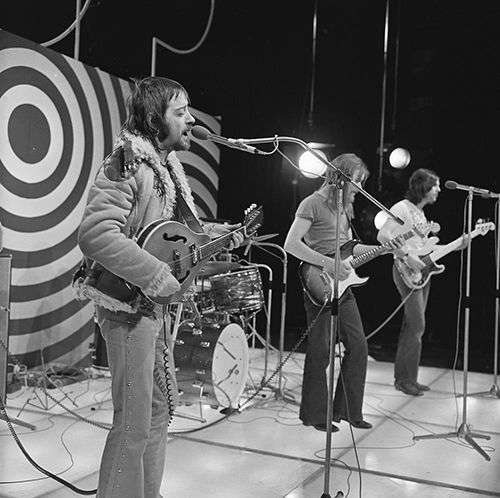
Fairport Convention in a Dutch television show in 1972

British folk rock developed in Britain during the mid to late 1960s by the bands Fairport Convention, and Pentangle which built on elements of American folk rock, and on the second British folk revival. It uses traditional music, and compositions in a traditional style, played on a combination of rock and traditional instruments. It was most significant in the 1970s, when it was taken up by groups such as Pentangle, Steeleye Span and the Albion Band. It was rapidly adopted and developed in the surrounding Celtic cultures of Brittany, where it was pioneered by Alan Stivell and bands like Malicorne; in Ireland by groups such as Horslips; in Canada by groups such as Barde; and also in Scotland, Wales and the Isle of Man and Cornwall, to produce Celtic rock and its derivatives. It has been influential in those parts of the world with close cultural connections to Britain, such as the US and Canada and gave rise to the subgenre of Medieval folk rock and the fusion genres of folk punk and folk metal. By the 1980s the genre was in steep decline in popularity, but has survived and revived in significance as part of a more general folk resurgence since the 1990s.

=== Folk punk ===
In the mid-1980s a new rebirth of English folk began, this time fusing folk with energy and political aggression derived from punk rock. Leaders included The Pogues, The Men They Couldn't Hang, Oyster Band and Billy Bragg. Folk dance music also became popular in the 80s, with acts like the English Country Blues Band and Tiger Moth. The decade later saw the use of reggae with English folk music by the band Edward II & the Red Hot Polkas, especially on their seminal Let's Polkasteady from 1987.

=== Folk metal ===
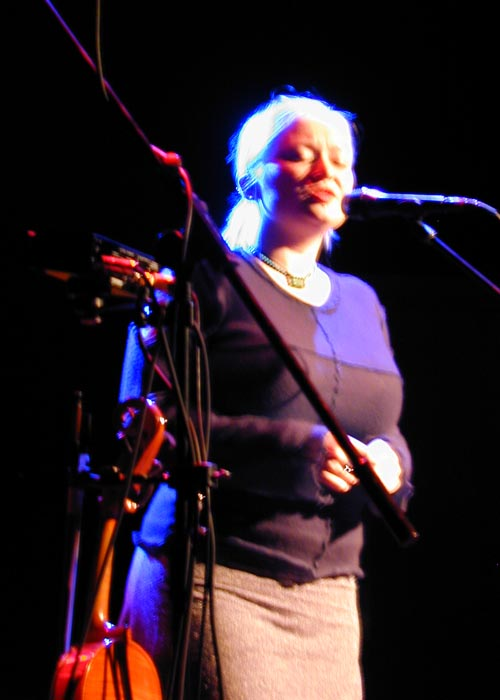
Eliza Carthy

In a process strikingly similar to the origins of British folk rock in the 1960s, the English thrash metal band Skyclad added violins from a session musician on several tracks for their 1990 debut album The Wayward Sons of Mother Earth. When this was well received they adopted a full-time fiddle player and moved towards a signature folk and jig style leading them to be credited as the pioneers of folk metal, which has spread to Ireland, the Baltic and Germany.

=== Traditional folk resurgence 1990–present ===
The peak of traditional English folk, like progressive and electric folk, was the mid- to late-1970s, when, for a time it threatened to break through into the mainstream. By the end of the decade, however, it was in decline. The attendance at, and numbers of folk clubs began to decrease, probably as new musical and social trends, including punk rock, new wave and electronic music began to dominate. Although many acts like Martin Carthy and the Watersons continued to perform successfully, there were very few significant new acts pursuing traditional forms in the 1980s. This began to change with a new generation in the 1990s. The arrival and sometimes mainstream success of acts like Kate Rusby, Bellowhead, Nancy Kerr, Kathryn Tickell, Jim Moray, Spiers and Boden, Seth Lakeman, Frank Turner, Laura Marling and Eliza Carthy, all largely concerned with acoustic performance of traditional material, marked a radical turn around in the fortunes of the tradition. This was reflected in the adoption creation of the BBC Radio 2 Folk Awards in 2000, which gave the music a much needed status and focus and the profile of folk music is as high in England today as it has been for over thirty years.

== Folk clubs ==
Although there were a handful of clubs that allowed space for the performance of traditional folk music by the early 1950s, its major boost came from the short-lived British skiffle craze, from about 1956–8. New clubs included the 'Ballad and Blues' club in a pub in Soho, co-founded by Ewan MacColl. As the craze subsided from the mid-1950s many of these clubs began to shift towards the performance of English traditional folk material. Many became strict 'policy clubs', that pursued a pure and traditional form of music. By the mid-1960s there were probably over 300 in Britain. Most clubs were simply a regular gathering, usually in the back or upstairs room of a public house on a weekly basis. They were largely a phenomenon of the urbanised middle classes and known for the amateur nature of many performances. There were also 'residents', who performed regular short sets of songs. Many of these later emerged as major performers in their own right, including A. L. Lloyd, Martin Carthy, and Shirley Collins. A later generation of performers used the folk club circuit for highly successful mainstream careers, including Billy Connolly, Jasper Carrott, Ian Dury and Barbara Dickson. The number of clubs began to decline in the 1980s, in the face of changing musical and social trends. But the decline began to stabilize in the mid-1990s with the resurgence of interest in folk music and there are now over 160 folk clubs in the United Kingdom, including many that can trace their origins back to the 1950s.

== Folk music and the radio ==
The difficulty of gaining regular appearances on television in England has long meant that radio has remained the major popular medium for increasing awareness of the genre. The EFDSS sponsored the BBC Home Service radio program, As I Roved Out, based on field recordings made by Peter Kennedy and Séamus Ennis from 1952 to 1958, which probably did more than any other single factor to introduce the general population to British folk music in the period. Also important were occasional radio shows, such as Lomax's Ballads and Blues (1951), MacColl's Radio-ballads (1958–64) and The Song Carriers (1968). John Peel frequently included folk music of his Top Gear show on Radio One from 1968, but dropped it when punk arrived in the 1970s.

The most consistent source of folk music on radio has been BBC Radio 2. In 1967 "My Kind of folk" was broadcast on Wednesdays. In 1970 "Folk on Friday" began, presented by Jim Lloyd. In 1972 it became "Folk on Sunday". "Folkweave" was presented by Tony Capstick 1975–8. "Folk on Two" (Wednesdays) began in 1980. In 1998 Jim Lloyd retired from the programme and was replaced by Mike Harding. In 2007 it was renamed "The Mike Harding Folk Show". In October 2012 it was announced that Mike Harding would be leaving the programme to be replaced by Mark Radcliffe.

Ian A. Anderson, editor of "fRoots", also presented the occasional series for Radio Two. He hosted a World music programme on "Jazz FM" and then spent 10 years broadcasting on the BBC World Service. He currently hosts "fRoots Radio" on the web.

For over twenty years, until 2006, Charlie Gillett presented World music on BBC London.

== Folk festivals ==
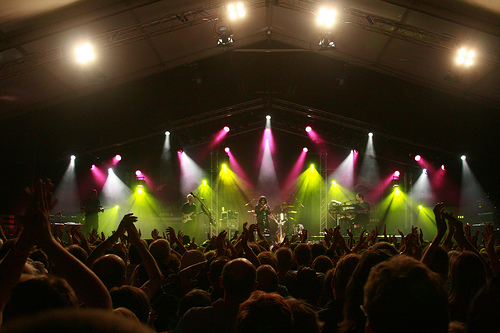
The Cambridge Folk Festival 2008

Folk festivals began to be organised by the EFDSS from about 1950, usually as local or regional event with an emphasis on dance, like the Sidmouth Festival (from 1955) and the Keele Festival (1965), which was abandoned in 1981 but reinstituted three years later as the National Folk Festival. The EFDSS gave up its organizing role in these festivals in the 1980s and most are locally run and financed. One of the largest and most prestigious English folk festivals at Cambridge was founded in 1965 and attracts about 10,000 people. Probably the largest is Fairport's Cropredy Convention, which since 1979 has provided a venue for folk, British folk rock, and rock artists; it now attracts up to 20,000 people a year as well as performances for Fairport Convention and their friends. Like rock festivals, folk festivals have begun to multiply since the 1990s and there are over a hundred folk festivals or varying sizes held in England every year.

== Forms of folk music ==
=== Ballads ===
A ballad is a form of verse, often a narrative story and set to music. Many ballads were written and sold as single sheet broadsides. They are usually narrative in structure and make considerable use of repetition. The traditional ballad has been seen as originating with the wandering minstrels of late medieval Europe. There have been many different and contradictory attempts to classify traditional ballads by theme, but commonly identified types are religious, supernatural, tragic, love, historic, legends and humour. Many ballads were brought by English settlers to the New World, thus contributing in part to the bedrock of American folk music that had been established via the Afro-American rhythmic traditions, the blues aesthetic, and the cross-pollination of the American immigrant cultures at the time.

=== Carols ===
A carol is a festive song. In modern times, carols are associated primarily with Christmas, but in reality there are carols celebrating all festivals and seasons of the year, and not necessarily Christian festivals. They were derived from a form of circle dance accompanied by singers, which was popular from the mid-12th century. From the 14th century they were used as processional songs, particularly at Advent, Easter and Christmas, and to accompany religious mystery plays. They declined after the Protestant Reformation which banned many religious festivals, but some famous carols were written in this period, including 'The Holly and the Ivy' and they were more strongly revived from the 19th century and began to be written and adapted by eminent composers.

=== Children's songs ===
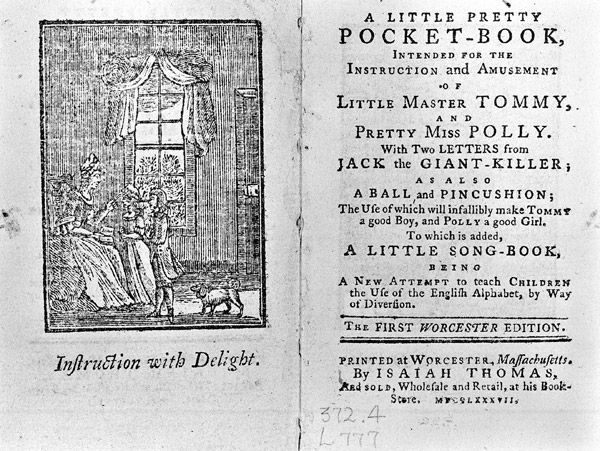
John Newbery's A Little Pretty Pocket Book

The earliest vernacular children's songs in Europe are lullabies from the later medieval period. From soon after we have records of short children's rhyming songs, but most nursery rhymes were not written down until the 18th century. The first English collections were Tommy Thumb's Song Book and a sequel, Tommy Thumb's Pretty Song Book, are both thought to have been published before 1744, and John Newbery's, Mother Goose's Melody, or, Sonnets for the Cradle (c.1785), is the first record we have of many classic rhymes. These rhymes seem to have come from a variety of sources, including traditional riddles, proverbs, ballads, lines of Mummers' plays, drinking songs, historical events, and, it has been suggested, ancient pagan rituals. Roughly half of the current body recognised 'traditional' English rhymes were known by the mid-18th century. From this period we sometimes know the origins and authors of rhymes, like 'Twinkle Twinkle Little Star', which combined an 18th-century French tune with a poem by English writer Jane Taylor and 'Mary Had a Little Lamb', written by Sarah Josepha Hale of Boston in 1830. The first, and possibly the most important collection to focus in this area was, James Orchard Halliwell's, The Nursery Rhymes of England (1842) and Popular Rhymes and Tales in 1849. At the height of the revival Sabine Baring-Gould produced A Book of Nursery Songs (1895), and Andrew Lang produced The Nursery Rhyme Book in 1897. Children's songs, unlike folk songs, have remained part of a living and continuous tradition, for although added to from other sources and affected by written versions, most adults pass on songs they learned from oral sources as children.

=== Erotic folk songs ===
It has been noted by most recent commentators on English folk song that love, the erotic and the pornographic were major traditional themes and, if more than ballads are considered, this may have been the largest groups of printed songs. Many collectors in the first revival either ignored such songs, or bowdlerised them for publication, as Francis Child and Cecil Sharp did in their collections. In the second revival, erotic folk song was more accepted as part of the canon of traditional song, helped by the publication of books such as Gershon Legman's, The Horn Book: Studies in Erotic Folklore (1964) and Ed Cray's, The Erotic Muse: American Bawdy Songs, which printed many previously unpublished songs (1968). In England A. L. Lloyd was the key figure in introducing erotic songs to the canon, lecturing and publishing on the subject. He recorded The Foggy Dew and Other Traditional English Love Songs in 1959, and then The Bird in the Bush, Traditional Erotic Songs in 1966 with Frankie Armstrong, and Anne Briggs. He drew a distinction between erotic songs, i.e. those that dealt with love and suggested sexuality through innuendo (like 'The Bonny Black Hare' and 'The Bird in the Bush'), and pornographic songs that were explicit and therefore unworthy of attention. Some authors, however, find these distinctions more difficult to maintain. Although erotic songs became part of the standard fare in folk clubs and among folk rock musicians, relatively few of the more explicit songs have been placed on record.

=== Hornpipes ===
The hornpipe is a style of dance music thought to have taken its name from an English reed instrument by at least the 17th century. In the mid-18th century it changed from 3/2 time to 2/2, assuming its modern character, and probably reaching the height of its popularity as it became a staple of theatrical performances. It is most often associated with the Sailor's Hornpipe, but has formed the basis of many individual and group country dances into the modern period. Like many dances it was taken up in Scotland and Ireland and given a distinctive national character and moved to America with emigration.

=== Jigs ===
Jigs are a style of dance music developed in England to accompany a lively dance with steps, turns and leaps. The term jig was derived from the French 'giguer', meaning 'to jump'. It was known as a dance in the 16th century, often in 2/4 time and the term was used for a dancing entertainment in 16th century plays. The dance began to be associated with music particularly in 6/8 time, and with slip jigs 9/8 time. In the 17th century the dance was adopted in Ireland and Scotland, where they were widely adapted, and with which countries they are now most often associated. In some, usually more northern, parts of England, these dances would be referred to as a "Gallop" – such as the Winster Gallop from Derbyshire (though this owes its origins to the Winster Morris).

=== Morris dance ===
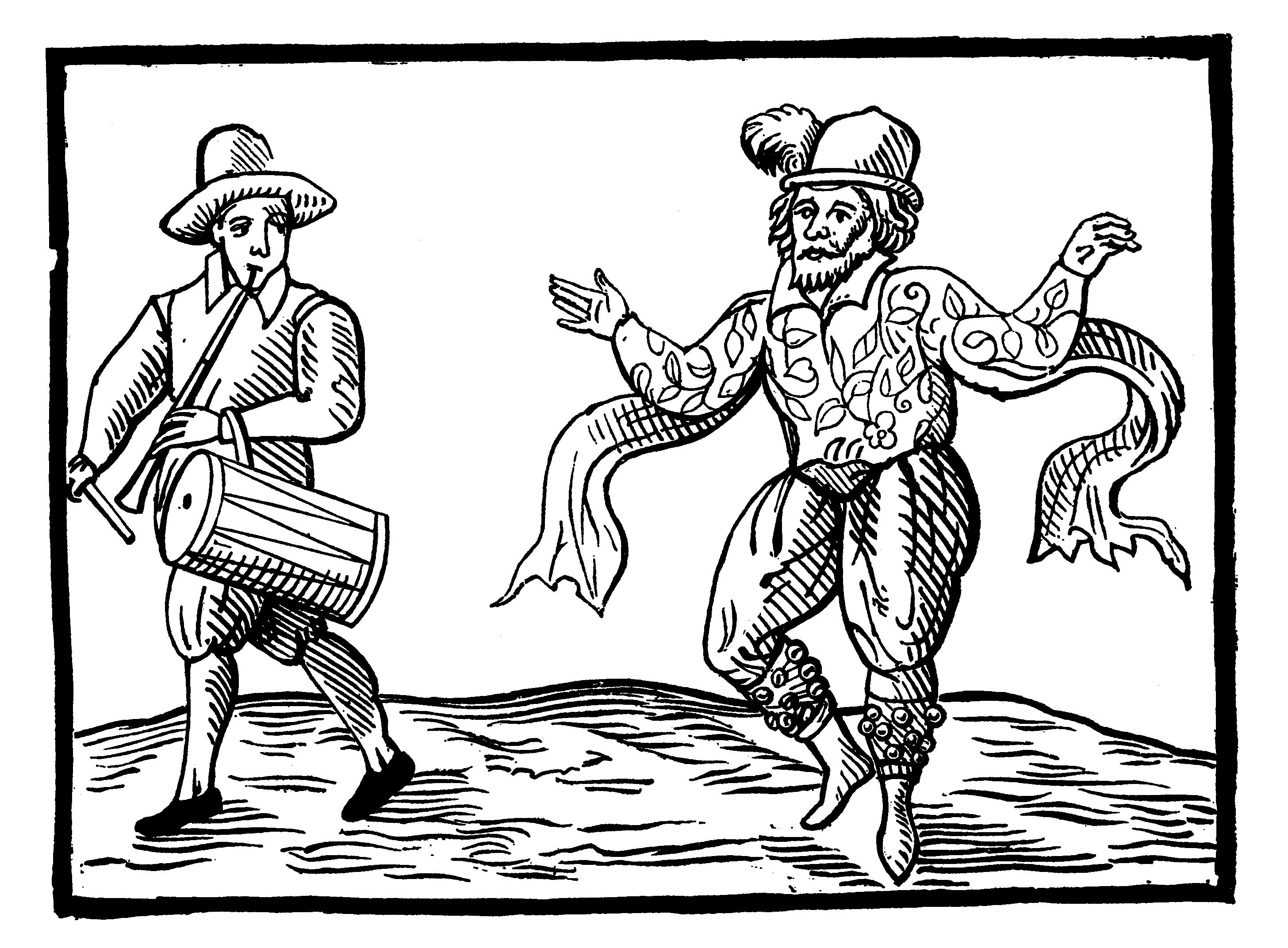
English Elizabethan clown Will Kempe dancing a jig from Norwich to London in 1600

A morris dance is a type of English folk dance, usually accompanied by music, and based on rhythmic stepping and the execution of choreographed figures by a group of dancers, often using implements such as sticks, swords, and handkerchiefs. The name is thought to derive from the term 'moorish dance', for Spanish (Muslim) styles of dance and may derive from English court dances of the period. References have been found that suggest that morris dance dates back to the mid-15th century, but claims of pre-Christian origins are now largely dismissed. Morris dance appears to have been widespread in England by the early 17th century, particularly in pastoral areas, but was suppressed, along with associated festivals during and after the English Civil War. It recovered after the Restoration in 1660 but was in steep decline after agricultural and industrial revolutions by the 19th century, when collectors like Cecil Sharp recorded the practice, particularly from versions of dance he found in the Cotswolds. This led to a revival of the tradition, although it may also have affected form and practice. Morris dance took something of a back seat to unaccompanied singing in the second revival, but received a further boost when it attracted the attention of British folk rock musicians like Ashley Hutchings, who produced several albums of dance music, including the influential Morris On series from 1972. Traditionally Morris dance was accompanied by either a pipe and tabor or a fiddle, but from the mid-19th century most common instruments were the melodeon, accordion, concertina and drums. Particularly in Cotswold and Border morris, many tunes are linked to particular dances. Morris dance survives in the distinct local traditions of Cotswold morris, north-west morris, Border Morris, rapper dance and Long Sword dance.

=== Protest songs ===
Perhaps the oldest clear example of an English protest song is the rhyme 'When Adam delved and Eve span, who was then the gentleman?', used in the Peasants Revolt of 1381. Songs that celebrated social bandits like Robin Hood, from the 14th century onwards can be seen as a more subtle form of protest. With the Levellers and Diggers in the mid-17th century, more overt criticism surfaced, as in the ballad "The Diggers' Song". From roughly the same period, songs of protest at war, pointing out the costs to human lives, also begin to appear, like "The Maunding Souldier or The Fruits of Warre is Beggery", framed as a begging appeal from a crippled soldier of the Thirty Years War. With industrialisation from the 18th century. A surprising English folk hero immortalised in song is Napoleon Bonaparte, in songs such as the "Bonny Bunch of Roses" and "Napoleon's Dream". As labour became more organised songs were used as anthems and propaganda, for miners with songs like "The Black Leg Miner", and for factory workers with songs like "The Factory Bell". These industrial protest songs were largely ignored during the first English folk revival of the later 19th and early 20th century, but were recorded by figures like A. L. Lloyd on albums such as The Iron Muse (1963). In the 1980s the anarchist rock band Chumbawamba recorded several versions of traditional English protest as English Rebel Songs 1381–1914. Ewan MacColl became the leading writer of English protest songs in the 1950s, with pro-communist songs such as "The Ballad of Ho Chi Minh" and "The Ballad of Stalin", as well as volatile protest and topical songs concerning the nuclear threat to peace, most notably "Against the Atom Bomb". The leading voice of protest in Thatcherite Britain in the 1980s was Billy Bragg, whose style of protest song and grass-roots political activism was mostly reminiscent of those of Woody Guthrie.

=== Sea shanties ===
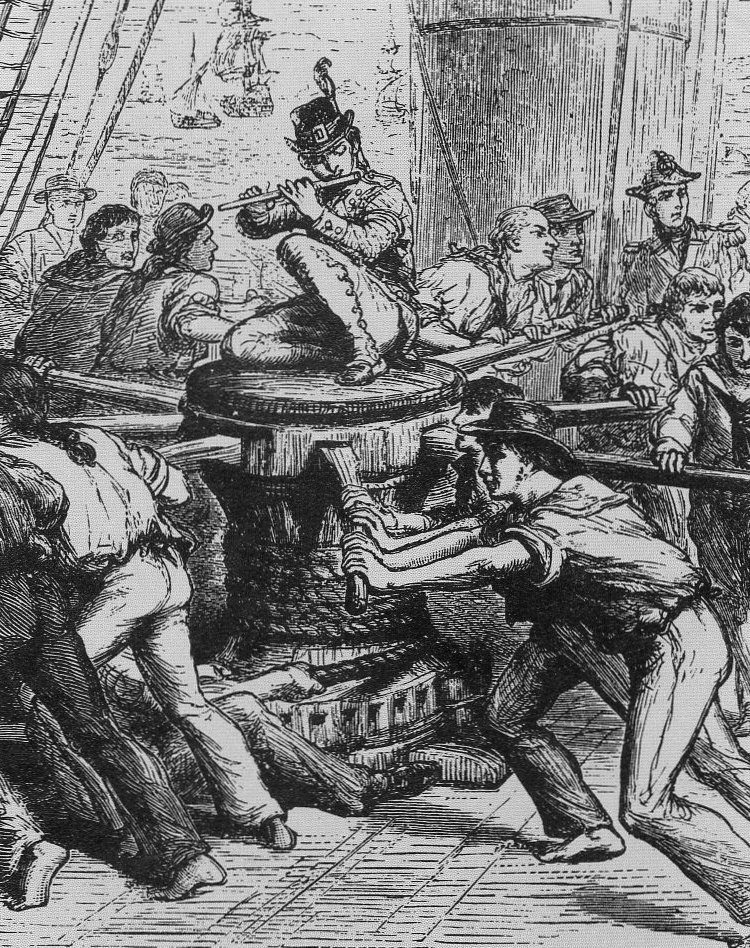
Sailors working at a capstan with musical accompaniment

Sea shanties are a type of work song traditionally sung by sailors. Derived from the French word 'chanter', meaning 'to sing', they may date from as early as the 15th century, but most recorded examples derive from the 19th century. Shanties were usually slow rhythmic songs designed to help with collective tasks on labour-intensive sailing and later steam ships. Many were call and response songs, with one voice (the shantyman) singing a lead line and the rest of the sailors giving a response together. They were derived from varied sources, including dances, folk songs, polkas, waltzes and even West African work-songs. Since different songs were useful for different tasks they are traditionally divided into three main categories, short haul shanties, for tasks requiring quick pulls over a relatively short time; halyard shanties, for heavier work requiring more set-up time between pulls; and Capstan shanties, for long, repetitive tasks requiring a sustained rhythm, but not involving working the lines. Famous shanties include, the 'Blow the Man Down and 'Bound for South Australia', some of which have remained in the public consciousness or been revived by popular recordings. There was some interest in sea shanties in the first revival from figures like Percy Grainger, who recorded several traditional versions on phonographs. In the second revival A. L. Lloyd attempted to popularise them, recording several albums of sea songs from 1965.

=== War songs ===
In England songs about military and naval subjects were a major part of the output of ballad writers from the 16th century onwards, including one of the earliest British ballads 'The Ballad of Chevy Chase', which deals with the events of the Scottish victory of the Battle of Otterburn in 1388 and may date to the early 15th century. The conflicts between England and Spain in the later 16th and early 17th centuries produced a number of ballads describing events, particularly naval conflicts like those of the Spanish Armada. The English Civil War (1642–1653) produced a subgenre of "Cavalier ballads", including "When the King Home in Peace Again". Many of these were adapted and reused by Jacobites after the 'Glorious Revolution' of 1688. The Anglo-French Wars of the 17th and 18th centuries saw more descriptive works, usually couched in patriotic terms, but some, like 'Captain Death' (1757) dealt with loss and defeat. As regimental identities emerged songs were adopted for marching, like 'The British Grenadiers', based on a 17th-century dance tune. Output became a flood during the French Revolutionary and Napoleonic Wars (1797–1815), seeing numerous patriotic war songs, like 'Heart of Oak' and the emergence of a stereotype of the English seaman as 'Jolly Jack Tar', who appeared in many ballads and on stage. As the musical hall began to take over the lead in popular music and folk song declined, folk song ceased to deal with contemporary wars in the later 19th century.

=== Work songs ===
Work songs include music sung while conducting a task (often to coordinate timing) or a song linked to a task or trade which might be a connected narrative, description, or protest song. The two main types of work song in England are agricultural work songs, usually are rhythmic a cappella songs sung by people working on a physical and often repetitive task, like the 'Harvest song' common in south-west England. The songs were probably intended to increase productivity while reducing feelings of boredom. Rhythms of work songs can serve to synchronize physical movement in a group or gang. Industrial folk song emerged in Britain in the 18th century, as workers took the music with which they were familiar, including ballads and agricultural work songs, and adapted them to their new experiences and circumstances. Unlike agricultural work songs, it was often unnecessary to use music to synchronise actions between workers, as the pace would be increasingly determined by water, steam, chemical and eventually electric power, and frequently impossible because of the noise of early industry. As a result, industrial folk songs tended to be descriptive of work, circumstances, or political in nature, making them amongst the earliest protest songs and were sung between work shifts or in leisure hours, rather than during work. This pattern can be seen in textile production, mining and eventually steel, shipbuilding, rail working and other industries.

== Regional traditions ==
=== East Anglia ===
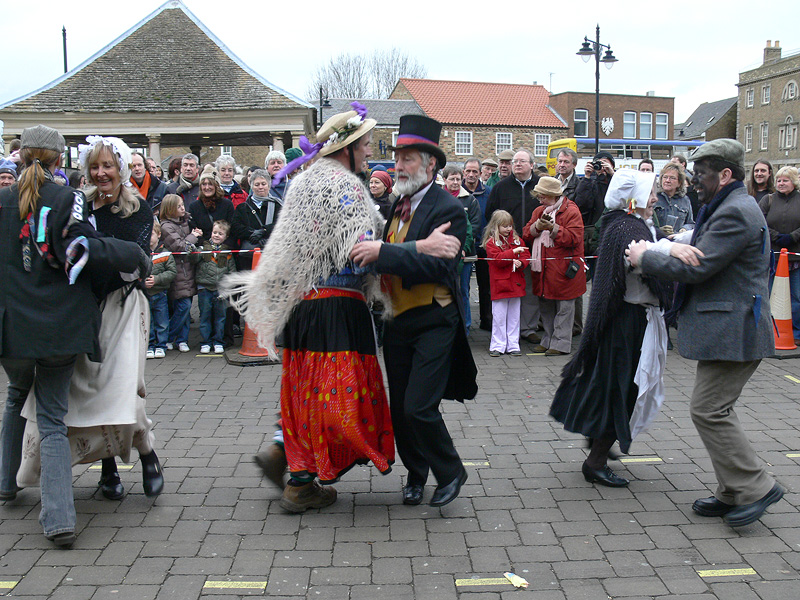
Molly dancers at Whittlesea Straw Bear Festival

Like many regions of England there are few distinctive local instruments and many songs were shared with the rest of Britain and with Ireland, although the distinct dialects of the regions sometimes lent them a particular stamp and, with one of the longest coastlines of any English region, songs about the sea were also particularly important. Along with the West Country, this was one of the regions that most firmly adopted reed instruments, producing many eminent practitioners of the melodeon from the mid-19th century. Also like the West Country it is one of the few regions where there is still an active tradition of step dancing and like the Midlands the tradition of Molly dance died out in the 1930s. The region was relatively neglected by folk song collectors of the first revival. Lucy Broadwood and Cecil Sharp collected in Cambridgeshire, as did and Vaughan Williams as well as in Norfolk and Essex from 1905, but most important regional figure was composer Ernest John Moeran, who collected over 150 songs in Norfolk and Suffolk in the 1920s. The second folk revival led to the discovery of many East Anglian folk musicians, including Suffolk melodeon player Oscar Woods, Norfolk singers Sam Larner (1878–1965), Harry Cox (1885–1971) and Walter Pardon (1914–96); Suffolk fiddler Harkie Nesling (1890–1978); Suffolk singer and bargeman Bob Roberts (1907–82), many of whom recorded for Topic Records. Perhaps the most influential folk dance musical album was English Country Dance Music (1965), put together by Reg Hall and Bob Davenport with largely Norfolk musicians, it was the first instrumental recording of folk instruments. Also from Norfolk was Peter Bellamy, who in solo projects, with the Young Tradition and in theatrical productions was probably one of the most influential musicians of the post revival period. The Norfolk melodeon player and singer Tony Hall has given the tradition a unique style. East Anglia made a contribution to the British folk rock scene of the 1970s, producing the short-lived, but more recently reformed, bands Midwinter and Stone Angel, based in Great Yarmouth and the more successful Spriguns of Tolgus from Cambridge, who produced four albums. The most successful folk artists from the region in recent years are probably the Essex born Billy Bragg and the Norfolk born Beth Orton. The region is home to numerous folk clubs and hosts many folk festivals, including Steeleye Span's Spanfest at Kentwell Hall, Suffolk and the Cambridge Folk Festival, generally seen as the most prestigious in the calendar. Since 2000 the East Anglian Traditional Music Trust has been promoting folk music in the region, organising a 'Traditional Music Day' every year in August.

=== The Midlands ===
Due to its lack of clear boundaries and a perceived lack of identity in its folk music, the English Midlands attracted relatively little interest in the early revivals. However, in more recent years a distinct cultural heritage has been recognised including unique folk traditions and songs, many associated with the regions industrial connections. It has also produced a number of important performers and some particular local instruments, such as the Lincolnshire bagpipes, however the last player, John Hunsley, died in the 19th century and no actual examples of the pipes have survived. From the 19th century the instruments used appear to have been much like those in other regions, with fiddles, accordions and eventually silver and brass. Although, some traditions, like Molly dance died out in the 1930s, the Midlands retained strong traditions of both ceremonial and social dance, particularly in the south Midlands and Cotswolds and in the distinctive Border Morris from Herefordshire, Worcestershire and Shropshire. The region also furnished some important material for folk songs, including a claim by Nottinghamshire for one of the most popular series of ballads, that of Robin Hood, while local places appear in songs such as 'The Leicester Chambermaid' and 'Oxford' or 'Worcester City'. Folk song collecting in the first revival was much less comprehensive than for many other regions. In the 1860s Llewellynn Jewitt, collected songs from Derbyshire, and some songs were printed by Georgina F. Jackson in her study of Shropshire folk lore. Cecil Sharp's interest in the region was largely confined to the south, particularly the Cotswold morris villages of Oxfordshire and Warwickshire, which provided him with an archetype of English ceremonial dance. From 1905, Percy Grainger was actively collecting in Lincolnshire, acquiring recordings of songs that would provide the basis for his Lincolnshire Posy (1937). It was not until the early 1970s that the broader heritage of the region, including the many industrial and work songs associated with mining or The Potteries, began to gain serious attention. Despite this neglect there was an active folk scene in the region, which produced several key artists of the second revival from the 1960s, including Anne Briggs from Nottinghamshire, The Settlers from the West Midlands and from Birmingham one of the most influential groups of the period, the Ian Campbell Folk Group, which numbered among its members later British folk rock musicians Dave Swarbrick and Dave Pegg. Slightly later a number of folk groups came out of Derbyshire, including The Druids, Ram's Bottom Band and Muckram Wakes, which included one of the most highly regarded modern performers John Tams. Lincolnshire has produced Martin Simpson, perhaps the most highly regarded folk guitarist of his generation. Birmingham's position as a centre for folk music has been emphasised by its place as the home of the Birmingham Conservatoire Folk Ensemble, led by former Albion Band fiddler Joe Broughton, which provides something of a clearing house of promising young folk musicians. The regions has numerous folk clubs and host many major folk festivals, including those of Gainsborough, Lincolnshire; Loughborough, Leicestershire; Shrewsbury, Shropshire; Warwick, Warwickshire; and Moseley, West Midlands.

=== The North West ===
Although relatively neglected in the first folk revival North West England had a rich tradition of balladry stretching back at least to the 17th century and sharing in the tradition of Border ballads, including perhaps the finest 'The Ballad of Chevy Chase', thought to have been composed by the Lancashire-born sixteenth century minstrel Richard Sheale. Lancashire in particular was a common location for folk songs, including 'The Lancashire Miller', 'Warrington Ale' and 'The soldier's farewell to Manchester', beside several local Wassailing songs. With a variety of dialects and acting as something of a crossroads for the cultures and immigrants of England, Scotland and Ireland, there is a distinctive local character to folk music, which expressed itself in local enthusiasm that emerged as a major factor within the wider folk movement in the second revival. The key event in the history of folk music in the counties of the north west of England was the Industrial Revolution, which divided the region economically and culturally into a northern, often highland and pastoral region, in Westmorland and Cumberland and a more urbanised and industrialised southern zone with large and growing conurbations like Manchester and Liverpool, where changing social and economic patterns emerged in new traditions and styles of folk song, often linked to migration and patterns of work, these included processional dances, often associated with rushbearing and the Wakes Week festivities and types of step dance, most famously clog dancing. These were very different from the styles of dance that collectors like Cecil Sharp had encountered in the Cotswolds and were largely dismissed by him as contaminated by urbanisation, yet they were, and remain, a thriving tradition of music and dance. A local pioneer of folk song collection in the first half of the 19th century in Lancashire was Shakespearian scholar James Orchard Halliwell, and he was followed a little later by John Harland, William E. Axon, Thomas T. Wilkinson and Sidney Gilpin, who performed a similar service for Cumberland. Most of these works, although important in unearthing, and in some cases preserving, locally relevant ballads, largely depended on manuscript sources, rather than oral collection and often did not give tunes, but only lyrics. It was not until the second folk revival that the full range of song from the region began to gain attention. The region not only produced one of the major figures of the revival in Ewan MacColl but also a local champion in Harry Boardman, who from 1965 onwards probably did more than anyone to popularise and record the industrial folk song of the region, in several albums and books. The region produced no significant bands in the folk rock movement of the 1970s but can claim one of the most significant figures, as Maddy Prior was brought up in Blackpool. However, perhaps the most influential folk artists to emerge from the region in this period were folk troubadour Roy Harper and comedian and broadcaster Mike Harding. More recently it has produced some significant performers including guitarist Ken Nicol and mother and daughter singer songwriters Chris and Kellie While. The region is home to numerous folk clubs, many of them catering to Irish and Scots folk. Folk festivals include the Fylde Folk Festival at Fleetwood in Lancashire.

=== Northumbria ===
Billy Purvis (1784–1853) one of the last travelling minstrel pipers of the south of Scotland and the north east of England.

Northumbria possesses a distinctive style of folk music with a flourishing and continuing tradition. The region is particularly noted for the unique Northumbrian smallpipes and strong fiddle tradition that was already well-established in the 1690s. Northumbrian music is characterised by considerable influence from other regions, particularly southern Scotland, other parts of the north of England and Ireland. Local tunes were collected from the mid-18th century by figures including Henry Atkinson and William Vickers and in the first revival by John Bell, Bruce. J. Collingwood and John Stokoe. The short-lived Northumbrian Small Pipes Society was founded in Newcastle in 1893 and the Northumbrian Pipers' Society in 1928, and they are generally credited with keeping the distinctive tradition alive. Border ballads were a major part of those collected by Francis James Child and make up most of the sixth volume of his ten volume collection of The English and Scottish Popular Ballads (1882–98). The second folk revival saw a number of acts drawing on this work, and enjoying some success. Probably the most influential piper at that time was Billy Pigg. Performers such Louis Killen, The High Level Ranters and Bob Davenport brought Northumbrian folk to national and international audiences. The 1970s saw folk rock bands like Lindisfarne, and the more traditionally focused Jack the Lad and Hedgehog Pie. More recently, Northumbrian folk music, and particularly the use of the Northumbrian pipes, has become one of the liveliest and most widely known subgenres of folk music in Britain, with artists like fiddler Nancy Kerr, piper Kathryn Tickell and Rachel Unthank and the Winterset gaining international reputations. Currently the region has over thirty active folk clubs and hosts several major folk festivals, including the Traditional Music Festival at Rothbury.

=== The South East ===
Even excluding Sussex and London, South-east England has been one of the key areas of English folk music and collection. It had retained a strong tradition of wassailing, and seafaring songs were important in the coastal counties of Kent and Hampshire. Arguably the published collection of oral material was made in this area by John Broadwood, as Old English Songs, As Now Sung by the Peasantry of the Weald of Surrey and Sussex (1843). When the first revival was at its height in the first decade of the 20th century, George Gardiner and Alice Gillington both collected songs in Hampshire, Lucy Broadwood in Surrey, Hampshire and Oxfordshire, Alfred Williams in Oxfordshire and Berkshire and Cecil Sharp in Berkshire, Buckinghamshire, and Kent. In the second folk revival the region contributed several figures, with probably the most important being Martin Carthy from Hertfordshire. The most significant British folk rock group from the region were the Oyster Band, formed in Canterbury, while guitarist John Martyn came from Surrey and fiddle player Chris Leslie from Banbury in Oxfordshire. From the current crop of young folk musicians probably the most prominent are Spiers and Boden from Oxfordshire and Chris Wood, born in Kent. The region is host to numerous folk clubs, and festivals, including the Oxford festival and Fairport's Cropredy Convention in Oxfordshire and St Albans in Hertfordshire.

==== London ====
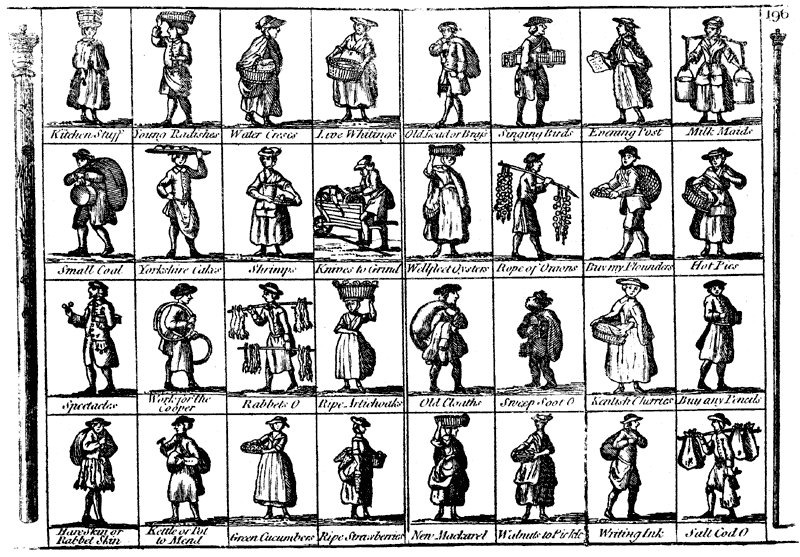
Street vendors in a 16th-century print

Despite being the centre of both folk revivals and the British folk rock movement, the songs of London were largely neglected in favour of regional and rural music until relatively recently. London, unsurprisingly, was the most common location mentioned in English folk songs, including 'London is a Fine Town', and the 'London Prentice' and it was the centre of the broadside publishing industry. From the 17th century to the 19th, street singers were characteristic of London life, often selling printed versions of the songs they sang. The capital is home to the Folk-Song Society and the English Folk Dance Society since the late 19th century (now known as the English Folk Dance and Song Society), but the most distinctive genre of London music, its many street cries, were not considered folk music by mainstream collectors and were recorded and published by figures such as Andrew White in Old London Street Cries; and, The Cries of To-day (1885). Both Ewan MacColl and A. L. Lloyd gravitated to London in the 1950s, it was the base of Topic Records and it was there that the first folk clubs were formed before they spread out across the country. It was also the home of folk musicians like Ashley Hutchings, Richard Thompson and Simon Nicol who formed Fairport Convention, and many artists, like Bert Jansch and Davy Graham, moved there in order to be able to pursue their careers or for the greater networks and opportunities the capital allowed. More recent performers of folk music include Noah and the Whale, Emma Lee Moss, Mumford and Sons, The Border Surrender and Anna Tam.

==== Sussex ====
Sussex has disproportionately affected the history of English folk music. This was due to a flourishing tradition of folk dance, mummers plays and folk song, but also in part because of the rural nature of the county in the late 19th and early 20th centuries and yet its relatively close proximity to London. It was thus a rich and convenient place for the collectors of the first folk song revival, including Kate Lee, Lucy Broadwood and W. P. Merrick. Sussex material was used by the composers of the English pastoral school, for example in Percy Grainger's arrangement of 'The Sussex Mummers' Christmas Carol', Ralph Vaughan Williams' use of the tune 'Monk's Gate' as a setting for John Bunyan's 'To be a Pilgrim' and George Butterworth's arrangement of 'Folk Songs from Sussex'. Most important of the collector's sources were the Copper Family of Rottingdean, who emerged as authorities on folk song and eventually as major recording artists. Sussex folk song also had a formative effect on one of the major figures of the second revival, as it was as a child of five in Sussex that A. L. Lloyd first heard folk music. Other performers include Scan Tester, Henry Burstow and the sisters Dolly and Shirley Collins. Sussex songs were also the foundation of the repertoire of the influential Young Tradition. The county has over twenty folk clubs and other venues hosting folk music by organisations such as Acoustic Sussex. There are also annual folk music festivals at Eastbourne, Crawley and Lewes.

=== The West Country ===
==== Cornwall ====
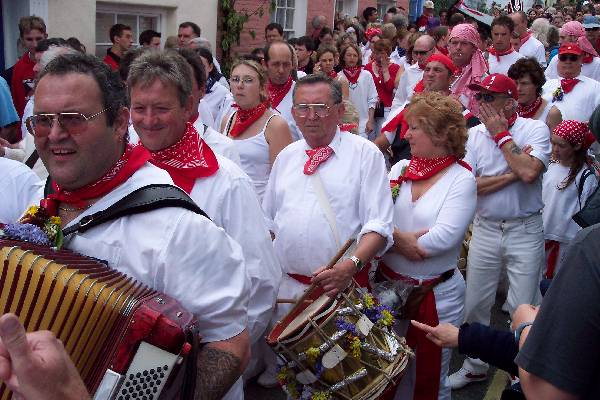
The red party attending the red 'obby 'oss in the Padstow mayday festival

The music of Cornwall is often noted for its similarity to that of Brittany and, as a result of the close physical and cultural ties between the two peninsulas, some older songs and carols share the same root as Breton tunes. From the late Middle Ages the fiddle (crowd in Cornish), bombarde (horn-pipe), bagpipes and harp all seem to have been used in music. The Cornish bagpipes died out, as elsewhere in southern England, in the 16th century, but have recently been re-created. From the mid-19th century accordions became progressively more popular as a folk instrument in the county, as in the rest of the West Country. There is long and varied history of Cornish dance from the medieval period, with records of strong traditions of morris dancing, mumming, guise dancing, and social dance. These seem to have been interrupted by the Reformation and Civil War and Commonwealth in the 16th and 17th centuries. However, there was revival from the late 18th century and seasonal and community festivals, mumming and guising all flourished. In the 19th century a strong tradition of nonconformity and temperance may also have affected dancing and music adversely and encouraged choral and brass band movements, while traditional tunes were used for carols. Some community events survived, such as the 'Obby 'Oss festival in Padstow and the Furry Dance in Helston. Folk songs include 'Sweet Nightingale', 'Little Eyes', and 'Lamorna'. 'Trelawny' is often sung at sporting events and is seen by many as an unofficial anthem. Few traditional Cornish lyrics survived the decline of the language, but in some cases lyrics of common English songs became attached to older Cornish tunes. Some folk tunes have Cornish lyrics written since the language revival of the 1920s. Modern Cornish musicians include the former Cornish folk singer Brenda Wootton and the Cornish-Breton family band Anao Atao. Recently bands like Sacred Turf, Skwardya and Krena, have begun performing British folk rock in the Cornish language. The Cornwall Folk Festival has been held annually for more than three decades.

==== The rest of the West Country ====
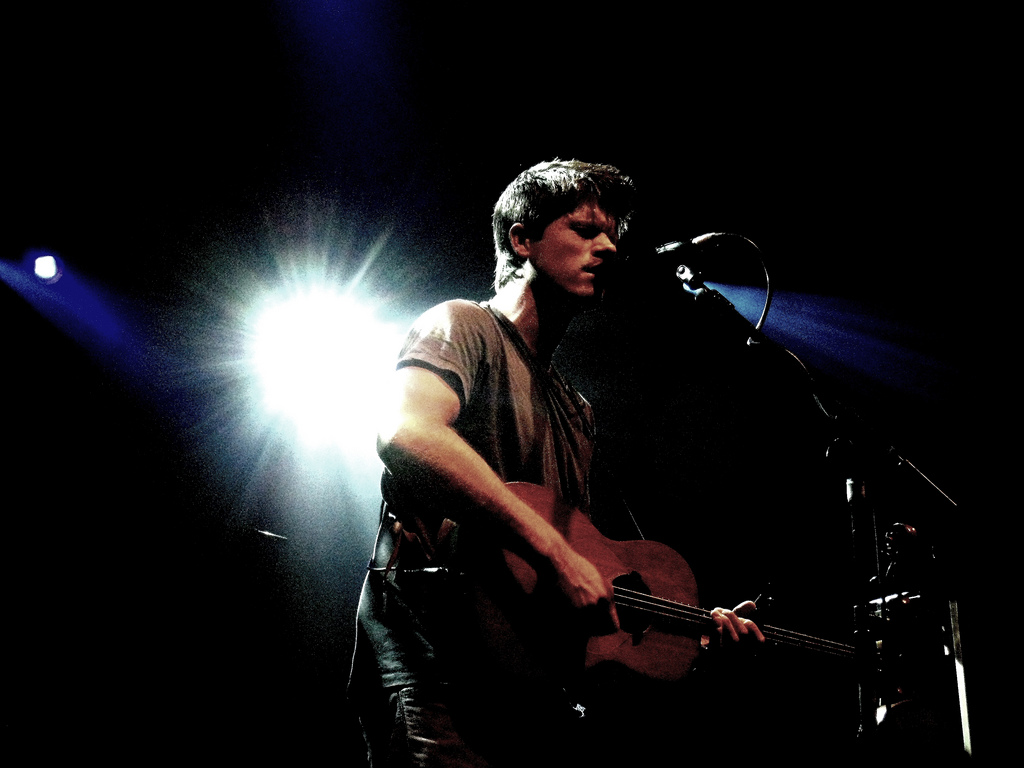
Seth Lakeman on stage in 2008

Outside Devon and Cornwall Celtic influence on music in the West Country is much less obvious, but folk music still retains many distinctive local characteristics. As in Cornwall there are very strong traditions of folk dance and mumming, the best known being the Hobby horse celebrations at Minehead in Somerset. The maritime heritage of Devon made sea shanties, hornpipes and naval or sea ballads important parts of regional folk music. From the 19th century accordions have been a popular and accepted part of the local folk sound. Folk songs from the West Country include 'Widdecombe Fair', 'Spanish Ladies' and 'The Seeds of Love.' The region was important in the first folk revival, as the Devon-born antiquarian Sabine Baring-Gould invested effort in collecting regional music, published as Songs and Ballads of the West (1889–91), the first collection published for the mass market. He later collaborated with Cecil Sharp who, with Charles Marson, produced a three volume Folk-Songs from Somerset (1904–09). Other collectors included Henry and Robert Hammond in Dorset, the Reverend Geoffrey Hill in Wiltshire, Percy Grainger in Gloucestershire and, perhaps the most famous, Ralph Vaughan Williams' 'Folk Songs from Somerset', which provided themes for his English Folk Song Suite. In the second folk revival the most famous West country musicians were melodeon-player Bob Cann and writer, performer and broadcaster Cyril Tawney, 'The Father of the West Country Folk Revival'. In the 1970s there were figures such as Tony Rose. The same period saw one of the most surprising hybrids in music history Scrumpy and Western with bands like the Wurzels and The Yetties, who took most of the elements of West Country folk music for comical folk-style songs with affectionate parodies of more mainstream musical genres, delivered in local West Country dialects. More seriously, the West Country and particularly Devon, have produced some of the most successful folk artists of recent years, including Show of Hands, Mark Bazeley and Jason Rice, Paul Downes, Jim Causley, Seth Lakeman and his brothers. The region has numerous folk clubs and annual festivals, including those at Portsmouth and the first modern English folk festival to be established at Sidmouth in Devon along with its associated 'Late Night Extra' venue at Bulverton .

=== Yorkshire ===
Yorkshire has a rich heritage of folk music and folk dance including the Long Sword dance. Folk songs were collected there from the 19th century but, though it probably had more attention than other Northern counties, its rich heritage of industrial folk song was relatively neglected. It was not until the second revival in the 1950s that Nigel and Mary Hudleston began to attempt to redress the balance, collecting Yorkshire songs between 1958 and 1978. Yorkshire folk song is often described as lacking the highly distinctive instrumental traditions found in areas such as Northumbria, although bagpipes such as pastoral pipes were recorded in the region, these appear to have died out during the 19th century. Alongside this, the Yorkshire fiddle playing has been described as occupying an intermediate position between the Northumbrian tradition and more Southern English/Midlands styles.

The tradition has chiefly associated with the use of dialect, particularly in the West Riding, as exemplified by the song On Ilkla Moor Baht 'at, probably written in the later 19th century and using a Kent folk tune (almost certainly borrowed via a Methodist hymnal), but widely regarded as an unofficial Yorkshire anthem. Many Yorkshire folk songs were not entirely unique in origin, reflecting a broader pattern of melodic adaptation common across British and European folk traditions, as with probably the most commercially successful Yorkshire song, Scarborough Fair recorded by Simon & Garfunkel, which was a version of the Scottish ballad 'The Elfin Knight'. The most famous folk performers from the county are the Watersons from Hull, who began recording Yorkshire versions of folk songs from 1965. Other Yorkshire folk musicians include Heather Wood (born 1945) of the Young Tradition, the short-lived folk rock group Mr Fox (1970–2), The Deighton Family, Julie Matthews, Kathryn Roberts, Barnsley comedy folk band The Bar-Steward Sons of Val Doonican and the Mercury Prize nominated Kate Rusby. Even considering its position as the largest county in England, Yorkshire has a flourishing folk music culture, with over forty folk clubs and thirty annual folk music festivals. In 2007, the Yorkshire Garland Group was formed to make Yorkshire folk songs accessible online and in schools.

== See also ==
- English country music – term used in 1960s to 1970s to describe a genre of instrumental traditional music
- List of selected, noteworthy folk musicians and bands (with an emphasis on artists from Britain and the U.S.A.) as contained in the Guinness Who's Who of Folk Music (pub. 1993)
