= Swan for the Money =

Studio album by Old Swan Band
- Released: 2011
- Genre: English folk

Old Swan Band chronology
Swan-Upmanship (2004)	Swan for the Money (2011)

Swan For The Money is an album by the Old Swan Band.

== Track listing ==
1. "The Green-Clad Hills/ Jimmy Garson's March" (Trad/ Trad)
  A tune collected in Orkney by Peter Kennedy, and one from England
2. "Mrs O'Dwyer's / Packie Russell's" (Trad. arr. OSB / Trad. arr. OSB)
3. "The Queen's Jig / The Basque" (Trad. arr. OSB / Trad. arr. OSB)
4. "Walter Bulwer's No. 2 & 1" (Trad. arr. OSB / Trad. arr. OSB)
5. "Staffordshire Hornpipe / Mad Moll of the Cheshire Hunts" (Trad. arr. OSB / Trad. arr. OSB)
6. "Dashing White Sergeant / Brighton Camp" (Bishop arr. OSB / Trad. arr. OSB)
7. "The Woodcutters Jig/ The Swedish Dance" (Headford / Trad. arr. OSB)
8. "Gloucester Hornpipe / Polly Put The Kettle On" (Trad. arr. OSB / Trad. arr. OSB)
9. "The Sloe / The Sweet Briar / Double Figure 8" (all Trad. arr. OSB)
10. "The Vine Tree / the Gentiane Mazurka" (Burgess / Trad. arr. OSB)
11. "Earl of Mansfield / Bobby Shaftoe" (McEwan arr. OSB / Trad. arr. OSB)
12. "In & Out the Windows / Down the Road" (Trad. arr. OSB / Trad. arr. OSB)
13. "Les Jigs - The Matelot / Michael Turner's Jig / Captain Lanoe's Quick March" (All Trad. arr. OSB)
14. "The Rose / J B Milne" (Trad. arr. OSB / Fitchet)
15. "Grand Chain / Grommet" (Trad. arr. OSB / Freya)

== Personnel ==
- John Adams (trombone, fiddle)
- Martin Brinsford (percussion, mouth organ)
- Paul Burgess (fiddle)
- Fi Fraser (fiddle)
- Jo Freya (tenor saxophone, whistle)
- Neil Gledhill (bass saxophone)
- Flos Headford (fiddle)
- Heather Horsley (keyboard)
