= Swan-Upmanship =

Studio album by Old Swan Band
- Released: 2004
- Genre: English folk

Old Swan Band chronology
| Still Swanning... After All These Years (1995) | Swan-Upmanship (2004) | Swan For The Money (2011) |

Swan-Upmanship is an album by the Old Swan Band.

Although these (mostly) obscure tunes come from England, Ireland, Scotland, France and Sweden, the band puts a distinctively English stamp on all of them. Firstly, they are taken at a steady, unhurried pace. This is a dance, not a race. Secondly, the style of the decoration is unfussy. Celtic bands often insert a "triplet" when there is a slight gap in the melody, creating a kind of "fill". English traditional country dance bands tend to leave the gap there. This gives the tunes an "open" confident feel to them. Instead, the most frequent decoration these tunes are given is something that only fiddles can do - they do a "swoop" into the opening note of the melody. Finally there is the percussion. Celtic bands tend to have a bodhran, a snare drum (particularly Scottish bands) or else there is no percussion. Here Martin Brinsford uses a huge variety of blocks, tambourines and shakers to give a certain swing to the quartet of fiddles. Sometimes there is a cheeky little syncopation. Irish music also uses syncopation, but only in short doses.

Track Details:

•Running Time: 59 minutes 56 seconds.

•Release Year: 2004.

== Track listing ==
1. "The Green-Clad Hills/ Jimmy Garson's March" (Trad/ Trad)
  A tune collected in Orkney by Peter Kennedy, and one from England
2. "Jack Robinson/ William Irwin's No 3/ The Tipputs" (Trad/ Trad/ Paul and Jane Burgess)
  The second tune is from the 1840s or 50s
3. "Steamboat Hornpipe/ Gloucester Hornpipe" (Trad/ Trad)
  The "Gloucester Hornpipe" is a different tune from the one the band recorded in 1981
4. (General Ward - false start)
5. "General Ward/ The Day Room" (Paul Burgess/ Paul Burgess)
  Written by Paul as he lay on a hospital bed
6. "Winster Gallop/ Four-Hand Reel/ Dark Girl Dressed in Blue" (Trad/ Trad/ Trad)
  The first is a morris dance tune, the second has 5 beats within a four-bar phrase,
  and the third was recorded by Stanley Holloway in 1959
7. "Church Street/ Redwing/ St Mary's" (Trad/ Kerry Mills/ Trad)
  "Redwing" is frequently credited as "Trad" but was written in 1907.
8. "Flowers of Edinburgh/ Soldier's Joy/ Morpeth Rant" (Trad/ Trad/ Trad)
  Three widely popular tunes. Two of them from the 18th century.
9. "Wenlock Edge/ Summer's Waltz" (Trad/ Ale Möller)
10. "Flowers of Edinburgh" (Longborough Morris Dancers version) (Trad)
11. "Schottis Fran Havero/ Another Fine Mess" (Trad (Swedish)/ Trad)
12. "George Green's College Hornpipe" (Trad)
  A different tune from the standard "College Hornpipe"
13. "Basquet of Oysters/ Sally Sloane's" (Trad/ Trad)
  The first title is based on a Basque tune, the second is from about 1840
14. "Freedom of Ireland/ Kitchen Girl" (Trad/ Trad)
  The first tune comes from Leo Rowsome
15. "Beatrice Hill's Three-Hand Reel" (Trad)
  From Gloucestershire
16. "Ger The Rigger/ Mickey Chewing Bubble Gum" (Trad/ Terry 'Cuz' Teahan)

== Personnel ==
- John Adams (trombone, fiddle)
- Martin Brinsford (percussion, mouth organ)
- Paul Burgess (fiddle)
- Fi Fraser (fiddle)
- Jo Freya (tenor saxophone, whistle)
- Neil Gledhill (bass saxophone)
- Flos Headford (fiddle)
- Heather Horsley (keyboard)
