= English country music =

English country music is a term that gained currency in the 1960s and early 70s to specifically describe a genre of instrumental music then receiving attention from the folk revival.

This was a deliberate attempt to avoid the term "folk", at the time being used widely to include much acoustically performed music with or without genuine folk origins or "traditional" which would strictly preclude the more recent material country musicians performed. Those like Keith Summers who sought traditional musicians in rural areas often found that both songs and tunes from published sources, music hall, radio, 78 recordings or later coexisted in a performer's repertoire, sometimes, but not always, alongside music which could be strictly defined as "folk" or "traditional". The focus for revival performers of English country music became the style of their informants as much as their repertoire. Rather than a folk club a venue might be a remote country pub where revival and traditional musicians or singers would make music together in the bar. These were sometimes organised by revivalists like Ken Stubbs and Taffy Thomas who had developed real empathy with the older musicians. The polka dominated instrumental repertoire differed from the music that had been associated with English country dance up to this point. The term seems to have fallen out of regular use in favour of a more relaxed definition of "traditional" perhaps due to confusion with the better known but altogether different American country music.

The band Oak's LP Welcome to Our Fair with its subtitle English Country Music and Song was a milestone in establishing the genre in the revival and this was followed by the even more influential re-issue by Topic Records of Reg Hall's earlier limited edition recording English Country Music. Reg's association with Sussex concertina player Scan Tester is well documented in his "I never played to many posh dances".

Original Oak members Rod and Danny Stradling moved to Cheltenham forming the Old Swan Band and initiating the English Country Music Weekends which started at Cricklade and featured traditional rather than revival musicians while Peta Webb and Tony Engle remained in London where Tony became the driving force behind Topic Records. Topic's catalogue became the mainstay of recorded source material for those aspiring to play English country music. English country music can still be heard at The East Anglian Music Trust's annual Traditional Music Day at Stowmarket's Museum of East Anglian Life every August, at other trust events and at pub sessions and barn dances or ceilidhs across the country.
