= New Victory Band =

The New Victory Band's 1978 album, One More Dance & Then, rereleased with six extra tracks in 2000

The New Victory Band was an English country dance band during the late 1970s/early 1980s.

The original line-up consisted of the members of Muckram Wakes (Roger Watson, Helen Watson, John Adams and Suzie Adams), Pete and Chris Coe, and Ian and Linda Wordsworth.

There were several bands during the '70s looking for a different approach to playing country dance tunes and dancing than was current in the English Folk Dance and Song Society dances. Going back to listen to traditional musicians like Bob Cann and Scan Tester was a good start. Remembering that these were social dances, not a precious art form, gave licence to all sorts of creative cavorting. Of these new bands, Old Swan Band, Flowers and Frolics, Umps and Dumps, Pump and Pluck seemed to concentrate more on Southern English styles and repertoire. The New Victory Band developed a more Northerly aspect, listening to recordings of George Tremain, Ned Pearson, Adam Gray, Willie Taylor & Will Atkinson.

The New Victory Band recorded just one album, One More Dance & Then, for Topic Records in 1978. It was re-released on CD by Backshift Records in 2000 and included six extra tracks recorded live on a continental tour towards the end of the band's existence.

During the life of the band, drummer Ian Wordsworth was replaced by Pierce Butler and additional members included Mel Dean on concertina and Peadar Long on sax.

The original instrumental line up was:

- Pete Coe - Melodeon
- Chris Coe - Hammered Dulcimer
- John Adams - Trombone, fiddle, melodeon, harmonium, banjo
- Suzie Adams - banjo
- Roger Watson - tuba, banjo, mouth organ
- Helen Watson - harmonium, piano, whistle
- Ian Wordsworth - drums
- Linda Wordsworth - tap dancing

The original Victory Band was actually several bands who recorded 7-inch 78s for Woolworths between 1928 and 1931. They sold for sixpence and the recording quality was dire, even though the musicians were distinguished (one band included Mantovani).
