= Oak (band) =

- Origin: Kingston upon Thames, England
- Genres: Folk
- Years active: 1970–1972
- Labels: Topic
- Past members: Tony Engle; Danny Stradling; Rod Stradling; Peta Webb

Oak was an English folk band formed in the early 1970s.

== History ==
The members of Oak, Tony Engle, Danny Stradling, Rod Stradling, and Peta Webb met in the 1960s in Kingston upon Thames, where Rod Stradling ran a folk club. The Stradlings moved to Camden Town in 1968 and became involved in running another folk club in Islington. In 1970, Rod Stradling formered a duo with Tony Engle.

They were asked by Bill Leader to make an LP for his Trailer label, but because Engle worked for Topic Records, he felt obliged to offer to record for them first. Welcome to Our Fair was recorded on May Day, 1971. The record created interest and the band played 163 gigs between the record's release and their final performance on 19 December 1972.

=== Later work ===
Rod and Danny Stradling went on to form The Cotswold Liberation Front, which later became the Old Swan Band. After a few years, they left the Old Swan Band, and Stradling recorded with the English Country Blues Band, the English Country Dance Band, Tiger Moth, and Edward II and the Red Hot Polkas. He is currently the editor of Musical Traditions.

Peta Webb, whose individual vocal style was influenced by Irish traditional singers (especially Margaret Barry, Sarah Makem, and Sarah and Rita Keane), released a solo album, I have wandered in Exile, in 1973. She recorded with Scottish singer Alison McMorland in 1980. In the early 1980s, she and Tony Engle were members of Alan Ward's Tex-Mex band The Armadillos. Webb recorded with the Watersons, was part of Sisters Unlimited in the 1980s and 90s, and formed her own band, Webb's Wonders.

Tony Engle produced classic folk recordings for Topic Records and played on several of them as a session musician. As of 2011 he was managing director of Topic Records.

== Personnel ==
- Tony Engle (voice, Anglo concertina, fiddle, bones)
- Danny Stradling (voice, tambourine)
- Rod Stradling (voice, melodeons)
- Peta Webb (voice, fiddle)

== Discography ==
- Welcome to Our Fair, Topic Records, 12TS212 (1971)
- Country Songs and Music, Musical Traditions, MTCD327-8 (2003) (includes tracks from Welcome to Our Fair and other archive recordings)
