= Mummers =

Medieval European performers

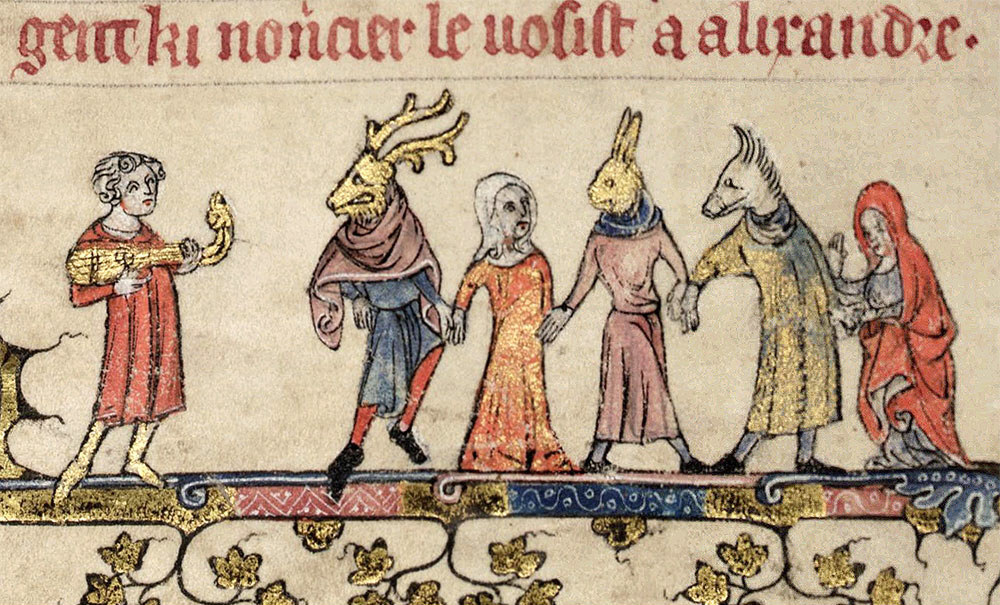
14th century, England. Performers dressed as a stag, rabbit and boar dance to the music of a gittern. The image is not labeled and these have been interpreted as "mummers" and "minstrels."

Mummers were bands of men and women from the medieval to early modern era who (during public festivities) dressed in fantastic clothes and costumes and serenaded people outside their houses, or joined the party inside. Costumes were varied and might include bears, unicorns, deer (with deer hides and antlers) or rams (with rams' horns). The practice was widespread in Europe, present in England, Ireland and Scotland, with words for it in German and French. The practice dates back to the Romans and has survived in some areas (such as Scotland) and is used in the holiday tradition of Mummers' plays. It has also been revived in the modern Mummers' Parade. The practice may also be related to miming.

== History ==
Mummering was preceded by the Roman holiday Saturnalia, in which partiers masqueraded. Feasts of Pallas Athena included "visars and painted visages." The holiday was a time of "frequent and luxurious feastings amongst friends, presents were mutually sent, and changes of dress made."

Mummers and "guisers" (performers in disguise) can be traced back at least to 1296, when the festivities for the marriage of Edward I's daughter at Christmas included "mummers of the court" along with "fiddlers and minstrels". These "revels" and "guisings" may have been an early form of masque and the early use of the term "mumming" appears to refer specifically to a performance of dicing with the host for costly jewels, after which the mummers would join the guests for dancing, an event recorded in 1377 when 130 men on horseback went "mumming" to the Prince of Wales, later Richard II.

Some of these habits carried over to Christmas, including exchanging clothes and visiting neighbors "in the manner which Germans call mummery," wassailing, and Saint Stephen's Day celebrations. In 1377, citizens of London dressed in mummery to amuse the son of Edward the Black Prince. In England, the tradition became associated with obnoxious behavior and led King Henry VIII to declare the wearing of masks to be a misdemeanor. In Scotland, mummers are called guisards and traditionally put on a "rude drama" called Galatian.

Mumming was labeled part of "the progeny of Father Christmas" by Ben Jonson in his 1616 play Chrismas Masque. In the 18th into the 19th century, mummers were mimes, actors, largely specializing in Christmas. The idea of mumming in the 19th century was that it looked back to "simpler times" and mumming antics became part of a "controlled expression of seasonal 'misrule'".

According to German and Austrian sources dating from the 16th century, during carnival persons wearing masks used to make house-to-house visits offering a mum(en)schanz, a game of dice. This custom was practised by commoners as well as nobility. On Shrove Tuesday of 1557 Albert V, Duke of Bavaria went to visit the archbishop of Salzburg and played a game of dice with him. A similar incident, involving an Englishman, is attested for the French court by the German count and chronicler Froben Christoph von Zimmern: during carnival 1540, while the French king Francis I was residing at Angers, an Englishman (ain Engellender) wearing a mask and accompanied by other masked persons paid a visit to the king and offered him a momschanz (a game of dice).

While mum(en)schanz was played not only by masked persons, and not only during carnival, the German word mummenschanz nevertheless took on the meaning "costume, masquerade" and, by the 18th century, had lost its association with gambling and dice. Other than this association there is no clear evidence linking these late medieval and early modern customs with English mumming.

== Etymology ==
The word mummers appears in late Middle English. It derived from the Old French word momeur, itself from momer ("to act in a mime").

Mummery ties to the similar Old French word mommerie.

The word is related to mum (silence, mum's the word), mum (to act in a dumb show), mumble (to speak indistinctly, silent utterance) and murmer.

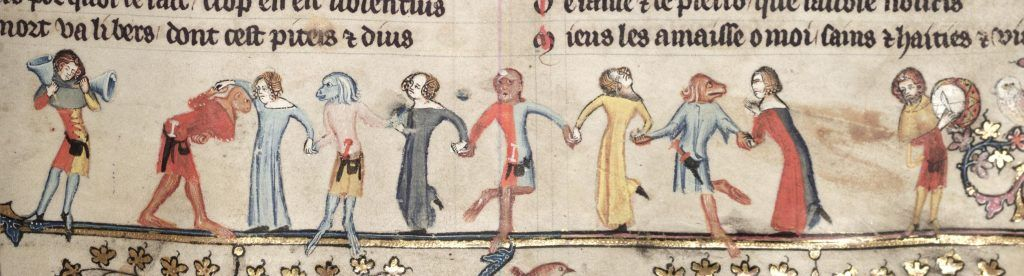
Not limited to Christmas in this image, partiers dressed as dogs and monkeys dance with ladies.

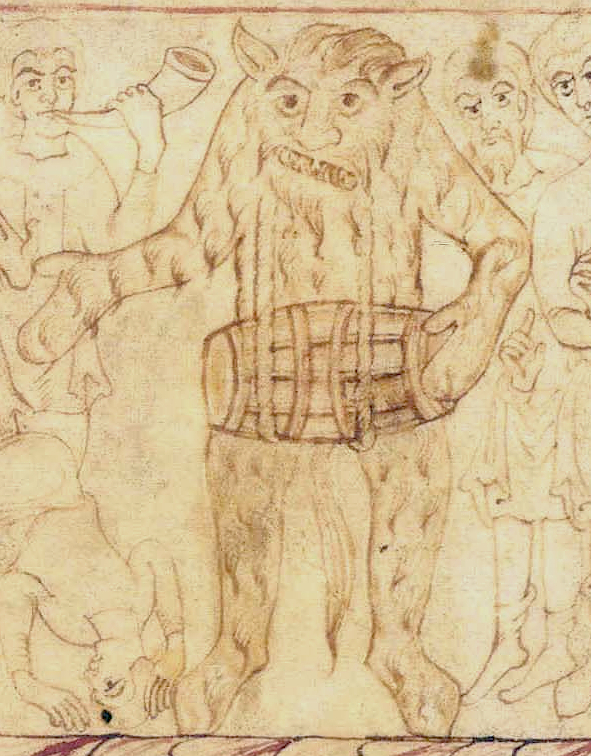
Early 12th century A.D., England. Image of demon or bear playing drum, possible mummer.

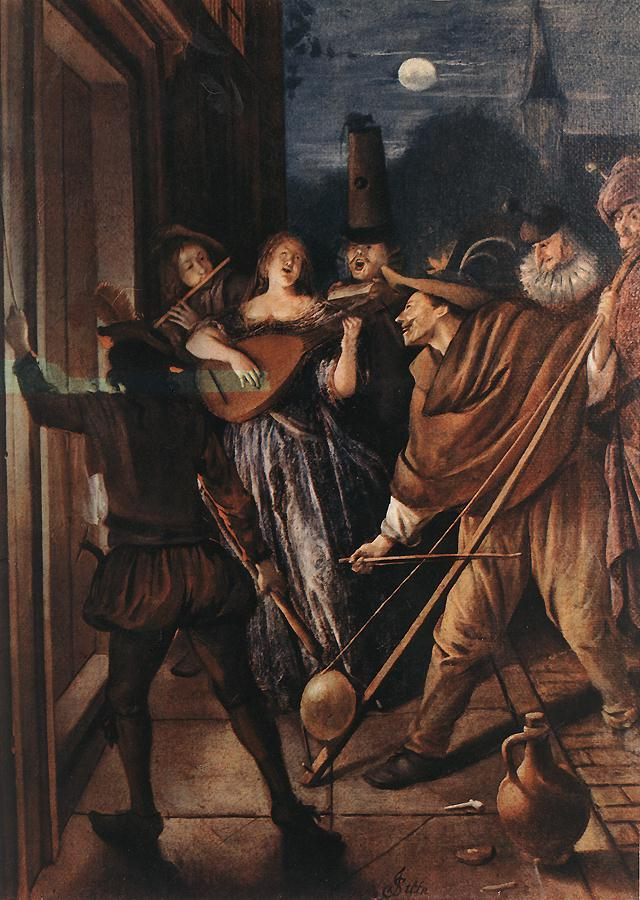
Revelers, some in mummers' garb, serenading in the Netherlands, playing a bumbass.

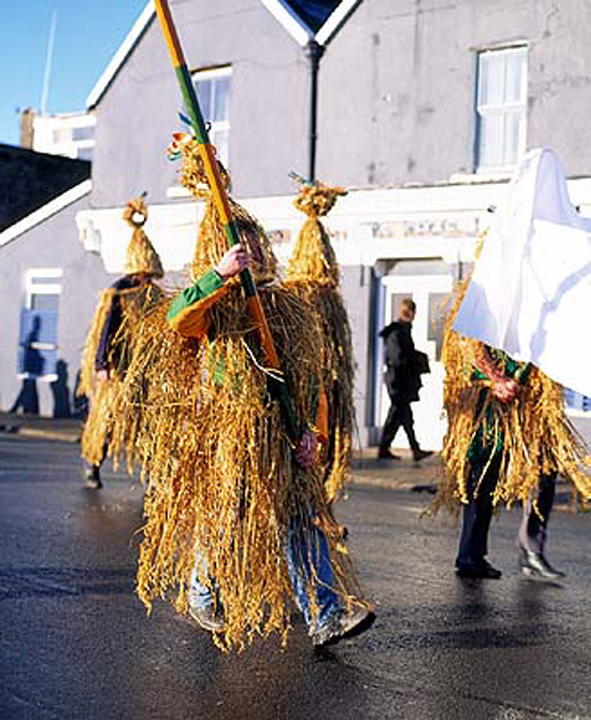
1990s, Ireland. "Wren boys" parading on Saint Stephen's Day.

Mummers performing in Exeter, Devon in 1994

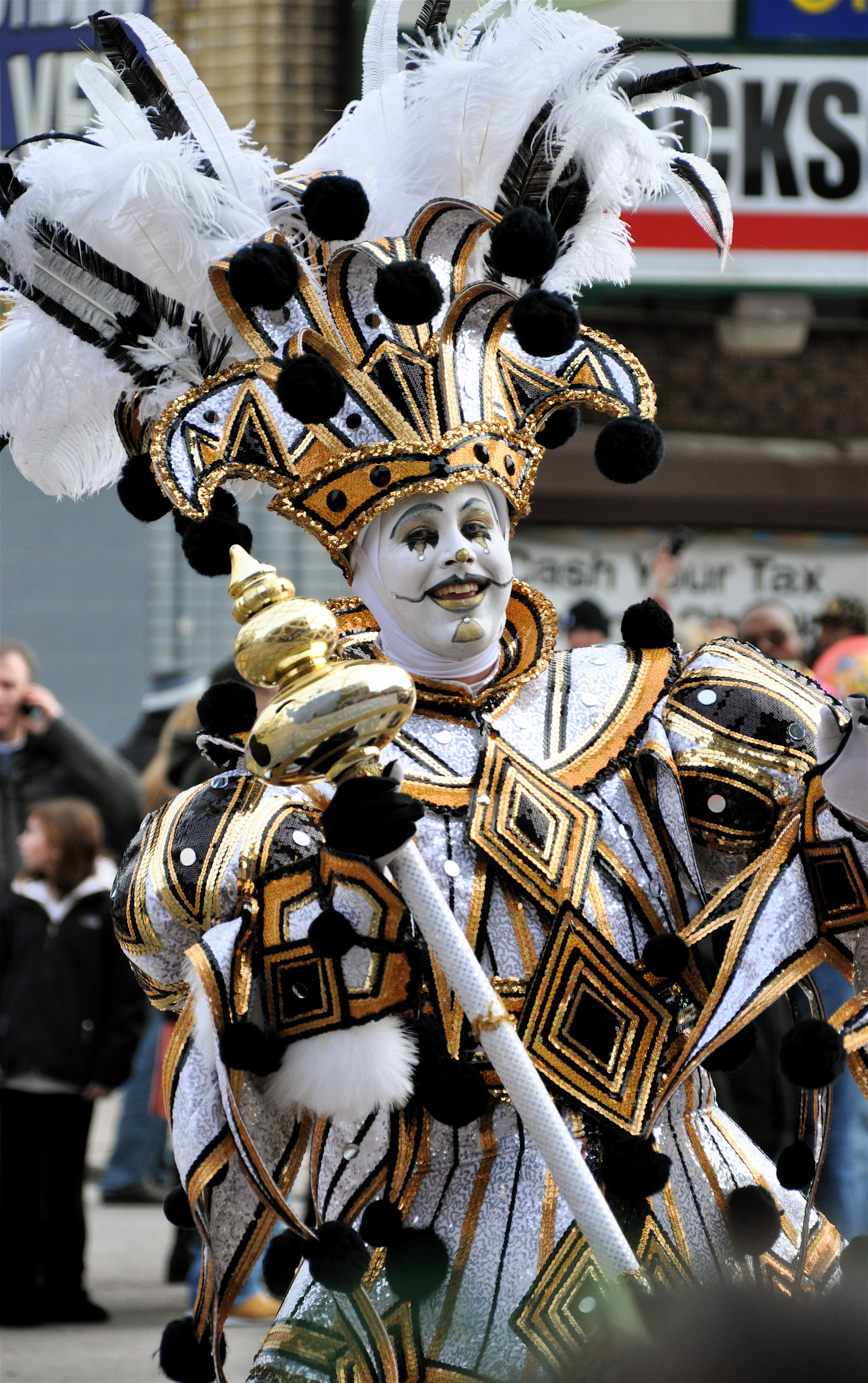
2010, Philadelphia, Pennsylvania. Mummer in the 2010 Mummers New Year's Day Parade.

== Local seasonal variants ==
=== Scotland ===
The Kirk Session records of Elgin name women who danced at New Year 1623 to the sound of a trumpet. Six men, described as guisers or "gwysseris" performed a sword dance wearing masks and visors covering their faces in the churchyard and in the courtyard of a house. They were fined 40 shillings each. In 1604 Tyberius Winchester was fined for "guising" through the town of Elgin with a pillowcase as a disguise and William Pattoun was accused of singing "hagmonayis". In January 1600, Alexander Smith's daughter was accused of guising in Elgin dressed as a man. This kind of dance and disguised "guising" through the town can be traced in various records. When Anne of Denmark came to Scotland in May 1590, twelve Edinburgh men performed a sword dance in costume with white shoes and floral hats, and other performed a Highland dance in costume. James VI himself wore a costume with a Venetian mask and danced at a wedding at Tullibardine in June 1591.
