= Scan Tester =

- Born: Lewis Tester; 7 September 1887; Chelwood Gate, Horsted Keynes, Sussex, England
- Died: May 1972
- Genre: Folk music
- Instruments: Anglo concertina, bandoneon, melodeon, fiddle
- Formerly of: Tester's Imperial

Lewis "Scan" Tester (7 September 1887 – May 1972) was an English folk and English country musician.

== Overview ==
Lewis Tester was born in Chelwood Gate, near Horsted Keynes, Sussex, England. At about the age of five he acquired the nickname "scantelope". There are several variants on the story, but his immediate family used the name "Scan" and he used it when advertising himself as a musician. He spent most of life in the area north of Brighton, playing Anglo concertina, bandoneon, melodeon and fiddle. He occasionally sang. Both his older brother, Trayton and a younger brother, Will played concertina. He lied about his age in order to be able to leave school early and earn money for his family. Parish records of the school suggest he was born in 1887, but he claimed it was 1886. At his father's pub, the Green Man at Horsted Keynes he learned step-dancing. He danced and played at weddings, harvest suppers and pubs with his elder brother and other local musicians.

== Gypsies and jazz ==
When visiting the hop fields of Kent he earned more money from playing concertina and dancing than he could have earned by pulling hops. There would be contests for dancing in the hop fields, including gypsy dancers, and he generally won the prize - a gallon of beer. After the First World War he formed a "jazz band" - that is a country dance band that included a full drum kit. It was called Tester's Imperial Band. He hired rooms and taught the dances - quadrilles, schottisches, polkas, and the like - before the dance started. His brother Trayton, brought a bandoneon back from Germany after the First World War. It was an oversized concertina, with a full deep sound, excellent for un-amplified playing. By the 1950s the instrument was no longer manufactured. For over forty years, Tester played at the Stone Quarry pub at Chelwood Gate. He was one of the last to play the old-time tunes.

== An elderly celebrity ==
Reg Hall was active in the 1950s, collecting tunes and encouraging traditional musicians. Hall met Tester in 1957, after Mervyn Plunkett discovered Tester and brought him to the attention of Hall. Soon he was brought to the headquarters of the English Folk Dance and Song Society at Cecil Sharp House in London. Tester went on to play at the Royal Festival Hall and big hotels. Hall collected his recordings which were issued as I Never Played to Many Posh Dances - Scan Tester 1887 - 1972. Hall's association with Tester was already documented in that collection. The album had 48 tracks with 51 tunes. They were not made in the recording studio. However they did capture a style that was nearly lost altogether. Hall ran a folk club at The Fox in Islington, London, and frequently invited Tester to play there. When Rod Stradling heard him play, he was inspired to form a series of bands to play the old style music. Of these, the Old Swan Band still thrives.

The accompanying book to the Topic Records 70 year anniversary boxed set Three Score and Ten has a picture of Scan with Reg Hall on the cover and Jenny Lind played with Rabbidy Baxter from the album Boscastle Breakdown is track ten of the seventh CD in the set.

Tester's death was reported in the Mid Sussex Times on 11 May 1972.

== See also ==
- Music of Sussex
