= The Border Surrender =

English rock band

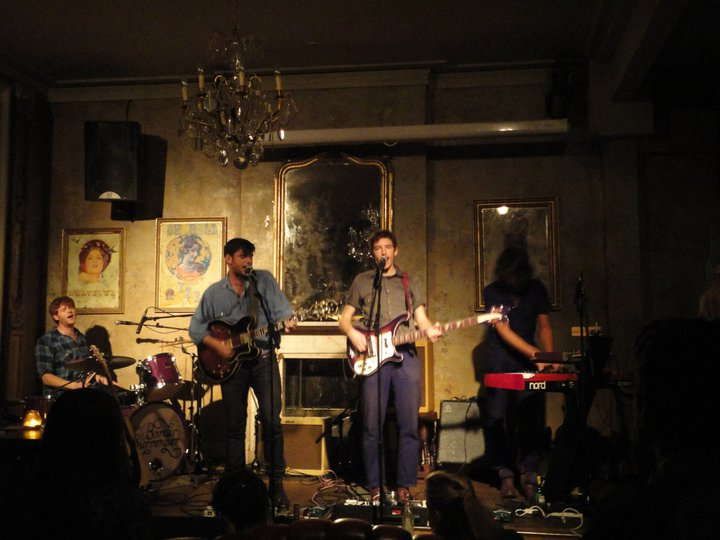
- 'Oh Mary' single launch at The Old Queens Head, Angel, London on 16 November 2010.

Background information
- Origin: London, England
- Genres: Rock, Americana, folk, blues, blues rock
- Years active: 2009–2011
- Label: Smoky Carrot Records
- Members: Keith Austin (vocals & guitar); Simon Sheilds (vocals, guitar, bass guitar & mandolin); Johnny Manning (keyboards, melodica, glockenspiel & accordion); Mark Austin (drums & vocals)
- Website: www.myspace.com/thebordersurrender

The Border Surrender were an English rock band based in North London. The band members were Keith Austin (vocals and guitar), Simon Shields (vocals, guitar, bass guitar and mandolin), Johnny Manning (keyboards, melodica, glockenspiel & accordion) and Mark Austin (drums and vocals). They were signed under Smoky Carrot Records.

== Live performances ==
The band performed energetic live performances with multiple instrument changes between the four members. One of their first filmed live performances was on BalconyTV London., the leading online viral music show, performing 'Oh Mary'. across the lock in Camden Town.

== In the media ==
Their first EP Blood in the Snow was released in April 2009 receiving positive industry reviews including:

- The Word
- The Word - Now Hear This, "15 brand-new Tracks picked by The Word".
- Americana UK.
- Ray-Ban Rooms.
- London Tour Dates Magazine.
- Oh, Inverted World.

Their single "Oh Mary" received further positive industry reviews including:

- Music Week.
- The Ruckus.
- Loud Horizon.
- Nostalgia for Infinity.
- Losing Today.
- The Camden Store.

A snapshot of radio plays include:

- BBC Radio 2, Dermot O'Leary.
- BBC 6 Music, BBC Introducing with Tom Robinson.
