= Old Swan Band =

English band

The Old Swan Band are a English country dance band.

== Early years ==
Their origin is in the early 1970s with the English country dance band Oak, one of a tiny handful at that time that combined melodeon with fiddles. Two members of Oak, husband and wife Rod and Danny Stradling (melodeon and vocals), went on to form The Cotswold Liberation Front, which became The Old Swan Band in 1974.

== Albums ==
The title of the Old Swan Band's first album, released in 1976, was their manifesto – "No Reels". This was a way of saying you would not find fancy reels and jigs or any frantically paced tunes. In their wake came several other folk dance bands that combined brass instruments with fiddles, such as the New Victory Band, the Cock and Bull Band and Ramsbottom.

After two more albums Rod and Danny Stradling left the band. The band became fiddle-dominated and after recording an EP in 1983, did not return to the recording studio until 2004 – a gap of twenty-one years, during which time the band's members also worked on other projects and with other bands.

The 2004 album, Swan-Upmanship was, as before, decidedly non-Celtic – almost all the tunes were drawn from the English tradition. The line-up on this recording was John Adams (trombone, fiddle), Martin Brinsford (percussion), Paul Burgess (fiddle), Fi Fraser (fiddle), Jo Freya (tenor saxophone, whistle), Neil Gledhill (bass saxophone), Flos Headford (fiddle) and Heather Horsley (keyboard).

== Other projects ==
Rod Stradling recorded with the English Country Blues Band, the English Country Dance Band, Tiger Moth and Edward II and the Red Hot Polkas. He became editor of Musical Traditions, a magazine whose archives are now available online .

The Fraser Sisters recorded as a duo. Jo Fraser changed her name to Jo Freya as a condition of joining the actors' union Equity, which does not allow two of its members to share the same name. Broadening her repertoire to embrace European influences, she joined Blowzabella and its spin-off Scarp; she also plays with Token Women (as do her sister Fi and Heather Horsley) and with her own pan-European group called Freyja.

Martin Brinsford went on to join Brass Monkey, with Martin Carthy.

== Discography ==
- No Reels - (1976) - Free Reed Records FRR 011
- Old Swan Brand - (1978) - Free Reed Records FRR 028
- Gamesters, Pickpockets and Harlots - (1981) - Dingle's, LP DIN 322
- The Old Swan Band - (1983) - Waterfront, WF EP 04, 7"ep with 5 tracks
- Still Swanning... After All These Years - Compilation album (1995) Free Reed Records, FREE-CD31
- Swan-Upmanship - (2004) - WildGoose, WGS320CD
- Swan For The Money - (2011) - WildGoose, WGS378CD
- Fortyssimo - (2014) - WildGoose, WGS407CD
- Fortyfived - (2019) - Wildgoose, WGS434CD

=== Anthologies ===
- This Label is not Removable - A Celebration of 25 years of Free Reed - (2001) - Free Reed Records, FRTCD 25
- Stepping Up: A History of the New Wave of English Country Dance Music - (2004) - TOPIC-CD752
- fRoots 24 - (2004) (fRoots magazine sampler)
