= Muckram Wakes =

English folk band from the north east Midlands

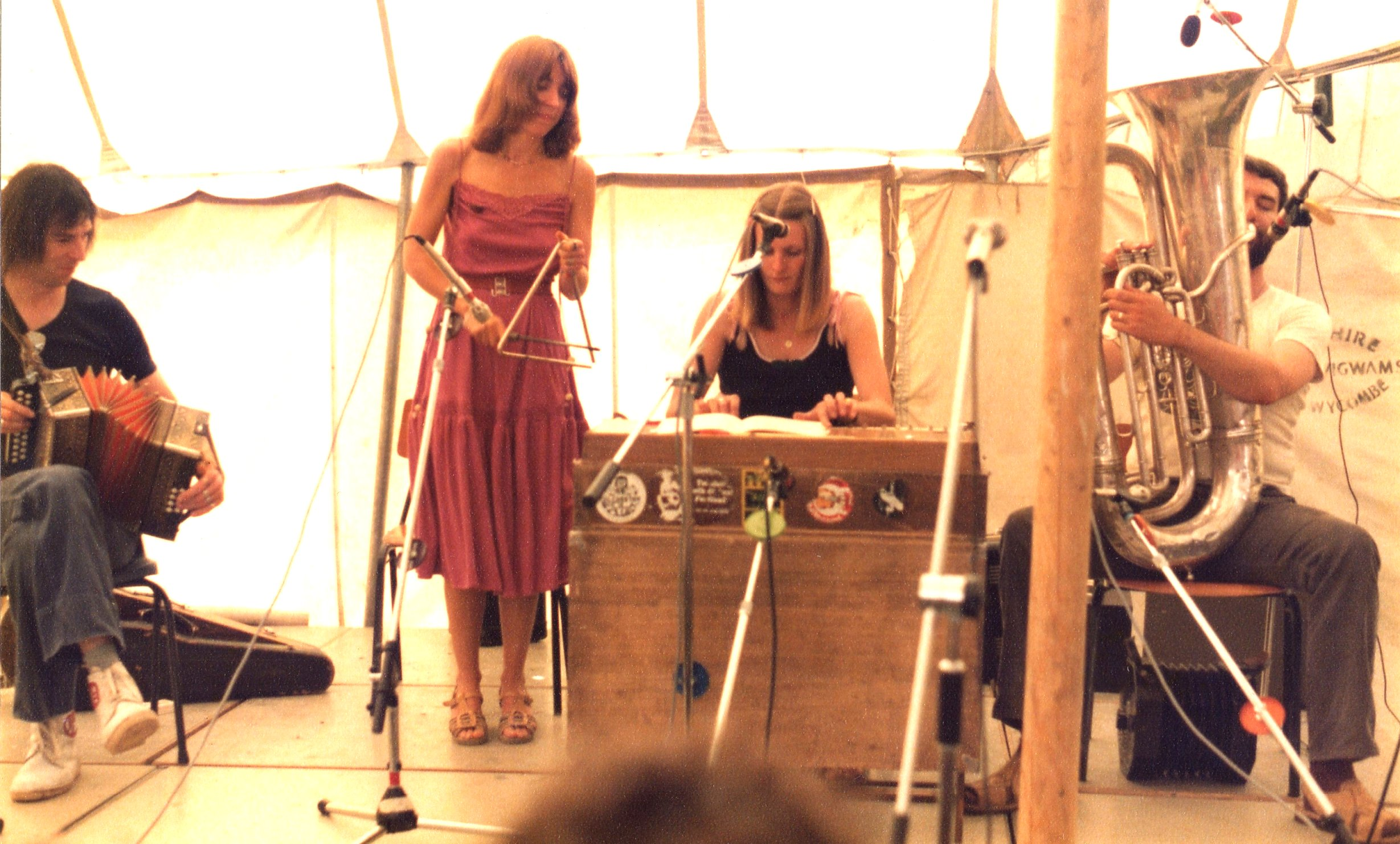
Muckram Wakes on stage at the 1980 Towersey Folk Festival

Muckram Wakes was an English folk band, from the north-east Midlands of England.

The original line up of Muckram Wakes was Roger and Helen Watson plus John Tams. Their album Map of Derbyshire, on Trailer Records, contributed greatly to the promotion of folk music from that county. The name Muckram Wakes derived from a small township in the region of Somercotes where Tams originated and Wakes, the local and northern word for a fair or holiday.

When John Tams left the band, he was replaced by John and Suzie Adams. The exact date of the invitation to join was 14 November 1973, when all four went into the Derbyshire hills on a day out to escape the Royal Wedding on that day. Within two years, Muckram Wakes were a full-time professional outfit, touring Britain and Europe, appearing at folk clubs, concerts and festivals plus radio and television. This line up of Muckram Wakes also constituted half of The New Victory Band, a seminal English folk concert and dance band.

In the early 1980s, following the departure of Roger and Helen Watson, the band continued for a short while with John and Suzie Adams joined by Keith Kendrick, Barry Coope and ultimately Ian Carter, all members of the Ram's Bottom Band. Barry Coope eventually joined the circle by working in duo with John Tams.

== Discography ==
- Map of Derbyshire (Trailer) (1973)
- Muckram Wakes (Trailer) (1976)
- Warbles, Jangles & Reeds (Highway) (1980)
- The Pick & the Maltshovel (contributed to the Roger Watson album) (Traditional Sound Recordings)
