= Blowzabella =

English folk band, formed 1978

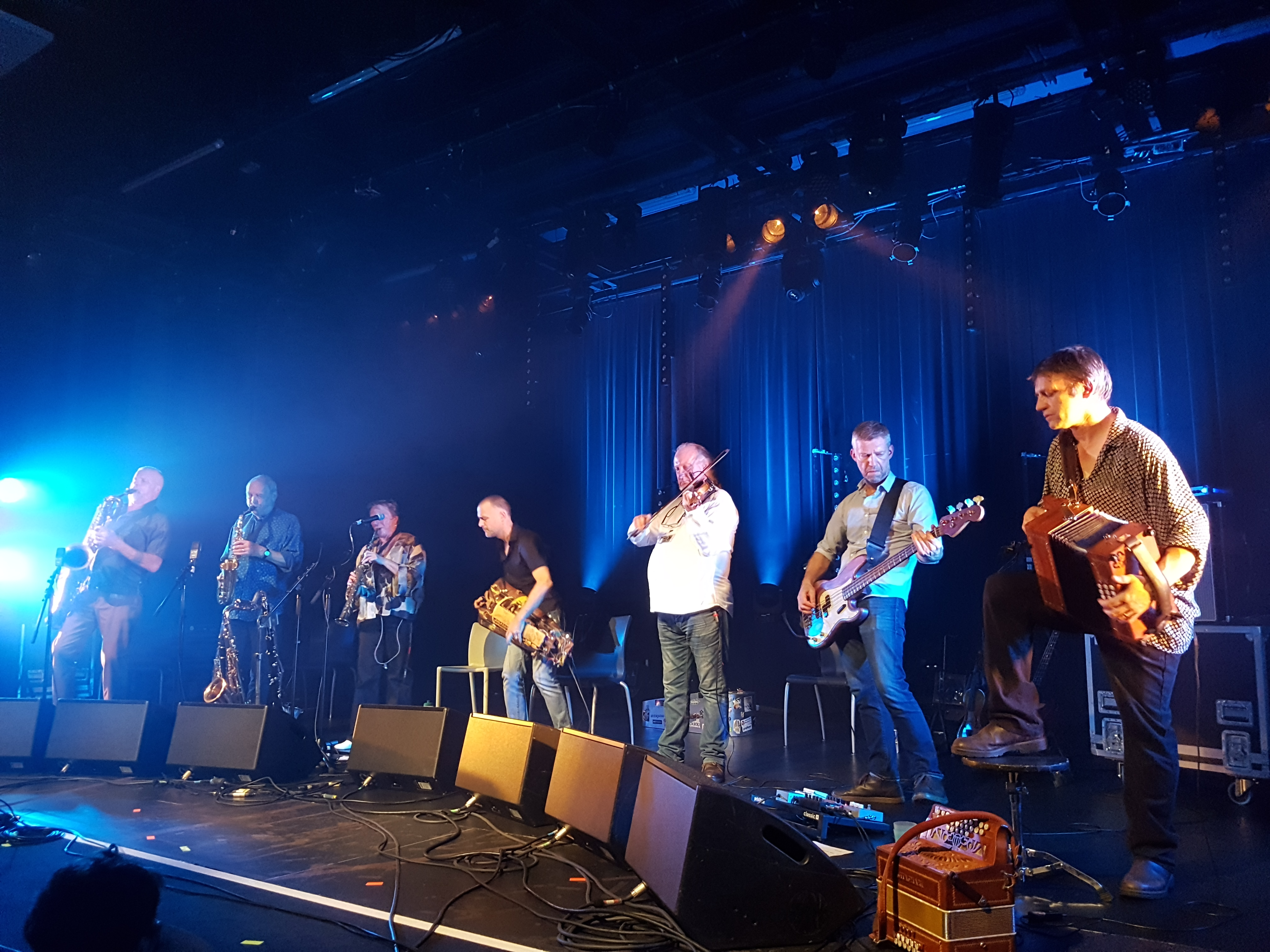
- Blowzabella at Folkiri 2018 in Le Mans

Background information
- Origin: London, England
- Genres: Folk
- Years active: 1978–present
- Members: Andy Cutting; Jo Freya; Paul James; Benoit Michaud; Barn Stradling; Jon Swayne
- Past members: Dave Armitage; Nigel Eaton; Chris Gunstone; Gregory Jolivet; Ian Luff; Bill O'Toole; Sam Palmer; Dave Roberts; Dave Shepherd; Cliff Stapleton
- Website: blowzabella.co.uk

Blowzabella is an English folk band formed in London in 1978. The band consists of Andy Cutting, Jo Freya, Paul James, Barn Stradling, and Jon Swayne. The lineup has changed several times since 1982, with Jon Swayne the only remaining original member. The group plays numerous instruments. It is strongly influenced by English and continental European traditional folk music. Many European folk artists cite Blowzabella as a major influence on their work.

== Current members ==
- Andy Cutting (diatonic button accordion, triangle)
- Jo Freya (clarinet, saxophone, vocals)
- Paul James (bagpipes, saxophone, vocals)
- Benoit Michaud (hurdy-gurdy)
- Barn Stradling (bass guitar)
- Jon Swayne (bagpipes, saxophone)

== History ==
Blowzabella was formed in Whitechapel, London in 1978 by original members Bill O'Toole, Jon Swayne, Chris Gunstone, Dave Armitage and Juan Wijngaard. When the band first formed, Swayne, O'Toole and Armitage were studying woodwind instrument making at the London College of Furniture, while Sam Palmer (who joined Blowzabella in May 1979) had recently finished the course and had already begun a career making hurdy-gurdies. Palmer published a definitive book on the hurdy-gurdy. During this time period Swayne, Armitage and Palmer lived at the Fieldgate Mansions in Whitechapel which were the band's headquarters after Swayne finished college in Somerset. Gunstone was living in Blackheath, and was heavily involved in Balkan music and dance.

== Naming the band ==
The band's name was taken from an 18th‑century English bagpipe jig, "Blowzabella", in 6/8 time. When the band asked what it meant, Bill O'Toole said he had no further information. Attributions linking the name to "Bouncing Doxie" are incorrect; the founding members were unaware of any such connection and the origin remained unclear for many years. The name was chosen hastily to meet a printers' deadline for posters advertising an upcoming concert, and would not have been selected had O'Toole known of any unsuitable connotations.

The tune derives from a popular 16th‑century Italian theme. The character Blowzabella appears in Thomas D'Urfy's 1719 collection Wit and Mirth, or Pills to Purge Melancholy under the title "The Italian Song Call'd Pastorella; made into an English Dialogue", and in his earlier 1619 play The Rise and Fall of Massaniello.

Bill O'Toole and Jon Swayne discovered the tune while researching bagpipe repertoire at the Vaughan Williams Memorial Library and considered the alliteration of "blow" and "bella" an apt description of the band's sound.

== Early years ==
In late 1979 Bill O'Toole formed the band Sirocco in Australia. That year original member Chris Gunstone founded Goat Bag Records; the label's first release, 17 Macedonian Folk Dances (by Gunstone's previous group, the Macedonian Early Music Band), reached number 8 in the Melody Maker folk album charts. Gunstone also formed the Macedonian group Izvoren, which included Jon Swayne (Macedonian bagpipe), Dave Roberts (tanbura) and Dave Armitage (tapan); all three later played with Blowzabella.

Gunstone then formed The Trio with Paul James (bagpipes, woodwind) and Cliff Stapleton (hurdy-gurdy). The Trio performed at the grand opening of the New Covent Garden Market in early 1980 and subsequently became full‑time musicians, appearing regularly at Covent Garden Market and in the portico of St. Paul's Cathedral. Paul James was also a member of the folk‑rock band Dr. Cosgill, which was represented by Goat Bag Records. At Dave Armitage's suggestion, Gunstone invited The Trio to join Blowzabella in late January 1981, producing a distinctive "wall of sound" formed by two bagpipes and two hurdy‑gurdies. Blowzabella and Izvoren both performed at the St Chartier Hurdy‑Gurdy and Bagpipe Maker's Festival in France in July 1981; the event was televised by French channel TF1.

Blowzabella's first recording with Bill O'Toole (bagpipe) was a live concert for the London French folk dance group L'Escargot in 1979. The band gained popularity playing fairs and festivals in southern England and East Anglia, where their unconventional performances and distinctive style attracted audiences. They appeared at the Hood and Albion Fairs and later performed at Switzerland's Nyon Folk Festival and the Trowbridge Village Pump Festival in 1980 and 1982 respectively. O'Toole developed and revived an English bagpipe for use in performances, drawing inspiration from medieval English church artwork and carvings. He also introduced stilt walking to the group's stagecraft, and all members except the hurdy‑gurdy player sometimes performed above the crowd. O'Toole organised the group's bookings on a rotating basis so that each member handled bookings in turn; the band operated on equal shares for money and organisation. After O'Toole's departure, Dave Armitage acted as chairman and managed the group with the support of the other members, during a period of high demand for bookings.

== 1981-1990 ==
- 1981 – Dave Armitage left the band in August.
- 1982 – Blowzabella recorded their first album, eponymously titled Blowzabella, at Dave Pegg's Woodworm Records (engineer Mark Powell) with Chris Gunstone, Dave Roberts, Sam Palmer, Cliff Stapleton and Jon Swayne. The album was co‑produced by Gunstone and Paul James (with Swayne co‑producing his tracks A2 and B3) and reached No. 4 in the Melody Maker Folk Album Charts in August. Paul James devised a way in spring 1982 for the band to finance their own album by foregoing four concert fees and paying the recording studio instead. At the end of the summer of 1982 Paul James changed the record label for the band's album and subsequently sought greater control of the group. Cliff Stapleton, who wished to be the sole hurdy‑gurdy player, indicated he would leave the band unless Chris Gunstone departed. In September 1982 Gunstone was voted out of the group and later became manager of Robert Mandel's East European Folk group (EEF), which featured Marta Sebestyen from Hungary. Gunstone honoured a commitment to Plant Life Records by making three months of radio appearances on the BBC World Service to promote Blowzabella's first LP and to secure several international festival bookings for the following year. After James assumed managerial responsibilities, the band concentrated on folk‑venue performances to support album sales.
- 1983 - Nine months later Sam Palmer left the band in 1983. Dave Armitage (bass‑curtal) rejoined Blowzabella for a brief period, along with Dave Shepherd (fiddle, five‑string fiddle, viola d'amore), who had previously played in bands with Dave Roberts and Paul James. Blowzabella recorded the album In Colour, featuring "the Daves" (Armitage, Roberts and Shepherd), Paul James, Sam Palmer, Cliff Stapleton and Jon Swayne. Guest performers included Max Johnson, Dave Mitchell, John Spires (of the Dead Sea Surfers) and drummer Terry Chimes (formerly of The Clash and Generation X). The band toured to the Vancouver and Winnipeg folk festivals. Samuel Palmer left the band in July 1983.
- 1984 – The band recorded the albums Tam Lin, featuring Frankie Armstrong and Brian Pearson, and Bobbityshooty with Armitage, James, Roberts, Shepherd, Stapleton and Swayne.
- 1985 – Armitage and Stapleton left Blowzabella. Stapleton had found the new focus on the folk‑club circuit too restrictive, and Armitage changed careers seeking a more stable income; Nigel Eaton (hurdy‑gurdy) and Ian Luff (bass guitar, cittern, mandola, darabuka) joined the band.
- 1986 – The Blowzabella Wall of Sound was recorded with Eaton, James, Luff, Roberts, Shepherd and Swayne.
- 1987 – Blowzabella recorded the live album Pingha Frenzy while on tour in Brazil for the British Council with Eaton, James, Luff, Roberts and Shepherd. Jo Freya (vocals, saxophone, clarinet) joined Blowzabella (credited as Jo Fraser).
- 1988 – Jon Swayne returned to the band. Chris Gunstone wrote to Plant Life Records in 1988 suggesting a tenth‑anniversary album, but he received no response.
- 1989 – Andy Cutting (diatonic button accordion) joined the band and appeared on the album Vanilla (1990) with Eaton, Freya, James, Luff and Swayne. Nigel Eaton later played on tour with Jimmy Page and Robert Plant from 1994 to 1996 and appeared on their live album No Quarter.

== Band dissolution and reunion ==
In late 1990, the pressure of constant touring led to a hiatus for Blowzabella. In 1996, Dave Roberts died. The line-up of Luff, Cutting, Swayne, Eaton, and Shepherd played a small number of performances from 1995 to 2001. In 2002, James proposed the band reform, and organized performances to celebrate Blowzabella's upcoming 25th anniversary. Cutting, Eaton, Freya, James, Luff, Shepherd, and Swayne played several festivals and performed together at a 25-year reunion concert in Bath in September 2003, with guest appearances by Dave Armitage, Bill O'Toole, and Sam Palmer. Gunstone initially accepted James' 25th reunion concert invitation, but later withdrew. At the end of 2004, Eaton left the band and was replaced by Gregory Jolivet, from Bourges, France. In December 2005, Luff left Blowzabella and was replaced by Barnaby Stradling on bass guitar.

== Recent changes ==
Since January 2006, the line-up has broadly remained the same. In July 2007, the band released the album Octomento, their first album of new material since 1990. This was followed in June 2010 by the live album Dance, an album of new and traditional material Strange News in October 2013, and Two Score in 2018. Jolivet left the band in August 2020 due to problems caused by Brexit and the COVID-19 pandemic. The studio album Tilham was released in 2022. Benoit Michaud joined in 2024 as the latest hurdy-gurdy player. The band continues to compose, record, and perform live (as of 2024). Dave Shepherd died on 14 March 2026; the group intends to continue as a six-piece. It has been announced that Blowzabella's '50th anniversary in 2028 is the right time to disband the group permanently.'

== Discography ==
Blowzabella

- Released: 1982
- Writers: Gunstone, James, Palmer, Roberts, Stapleton, Swayne
- Producer: Wormwood Studios, Barford St. Michael, Oxford, England.

Produced by Chris Gunstone and Paul James, with Jon Swayne (Tracks 2 & 9).

In Colour

- Released: 1983
- Writers: Armitage, James, Palmer, Roberts, Shepherd, Stapleton, Swayne. Guests: Max Johnson, Dave Mitchell, John Spires (The Dead Sea Surfers) on "Masters of War"; Terry Chimes on "Dans-tro Plinn"
- Producer: Wave Studios, London by Charles Gray and Mike Brown (tracks 1–6); recorded live at the Newbury Arts Workshop using Sound Advice mobile studio by Malcolm Rivett-Carnac and David Howard (tracks 7–12)

Bobbityshooty

- Released: 1984
- Writers: Armitage, James, Roberts, Shepherd, Stapleton, Swayne
- Producer: Ideal Sound Recorders, London. Produced by Paul James and Charles Gray

Wall of Sound

- Released: 1986
- Writers: Gerald Adams, Armitage, Eaton, James, Alan Lamb, Ian Luff, Roberts, Shepherd, Stapleton, Swayne
- Producer: Recorded at Ideal Sound Recorders, London. Produced by Paul James and Charles Gray

The B to A of Blowzabella

- Released: 1987
- Writers: Eaton, James, Luff, Lamb, Roberts, Swayne
- Producer: Recorded at Pathway, London; live, direct to digital 2 track. Produced, recorded, and edited by Charles Gray

Pingha Frenzy - Live in Brazil

- Released: 1987
- Writers: Eaton, James, Luff, Shepherd
- Producer: Recorded live on tour in Brazil by Charles Gray using Shure SM57 microphones and a Sony F1 Digital Audio Recorder

A Richer Dust

- Released: 1988
- Writers: Eaton, Jo Fraser, Charles Gray, James, Luff, Roberts, Shepherd, Swayne
- Producer: Produced by Charles Gray and Paul James at Milo Studios, London

Vanilla

- Released: 1990
- Writers: Andy Cutting, Eaton, Jo Freya, James, Luff, Swayne
- Producer: Produced by Paul James

Octomento

- Released: 2007
- Writers: Cutting, Jo Freya, James, Gregory Jolivet, Shepherd, Barnaby Stradling, Swayne
- Producer: Recorded at St. Michael's Church, Inkpen, England by Paul James and Jon Swayne. "Jackie Tar" and "L'Ange" recorded by Paul James in nave of Church.

Dance - Live

- Released: 2010
- Writers: Cutting, Freya, James, Jolivet, Shepherd, Stradling, Swayne
- Producer: Recorded live in Exeter, Bath, and Lincoln by Mark Simms

Strange News

- Released: 2013
- Writers: Cutting, Freya, James, Jolivet, Shepherd, Stradling, Swayne. Guest: Patrick Bouffard on "The Diggers/Cotillon".
- Producer: Produced by Blowzabella. Recorded by Paul James and Jon Swayne at Kennard Moor Drove, Coxbridge, Somerset, England with help from Sarah Orme. Also recorded in Franchesse, Allier, Auvergne, France with help from Patrick Bouffard and Violaine Jourdren. Vocals recorded by Neil Ferguson in Leeds, England

Two Score

- Released: 2018
- Writers: Andy Cutting, Jo Freya, James, Jolivet, Shepherd, Stradling, Swayne
- Producer: Recorded by Joe Garcia at Kennard Moor Drove, Coxbridge, Somerset, England

Tilham

- Released: 2022
- Writers: Cutting, Freya, James, Shepherd, Stradling, Swayne
- Producer: Recorded by Joe Garcia at Tilham Farm, Baltonsborough, Somerset, England

Happy Times

- Released: 2024
- Writers: Armitage, Gunstone, O'Toole, Palmer.
- Producer: Recorded by Chris Gunstone, Live concert 1979 earliest recording of original Blowzabella, Victoria Park, Hackney, London, England

Original Blowzabella

- Released: 2024
- Writers: Armitage, Gunstone, O'Toole, Palmer, Swayne.
- Producer: Recorded by Jon Swayne and Chris Gunstone using Revox B-77 recording the original Blowzabella at Whitechapel 1979, England

== Sources ==
- Encyclopedia Blowzabellica - The Blowzabella Tune & Dance Book. Dragonfly Music, 1987.
- Encyclopedia Blowzabellica - The Blowzabella Tune & Dance Book. Second edition. Blowzabella, 2010. ISBN 0-9549013-1-2
- Blowzabella. New Tunes for Dancing. Blowzabella, 2004. ISBN 0-9549013-0-4
