= Jo Freya =

Jo Freya (born 4 December 1960) is an English saxophonist, clarinettist and singer.

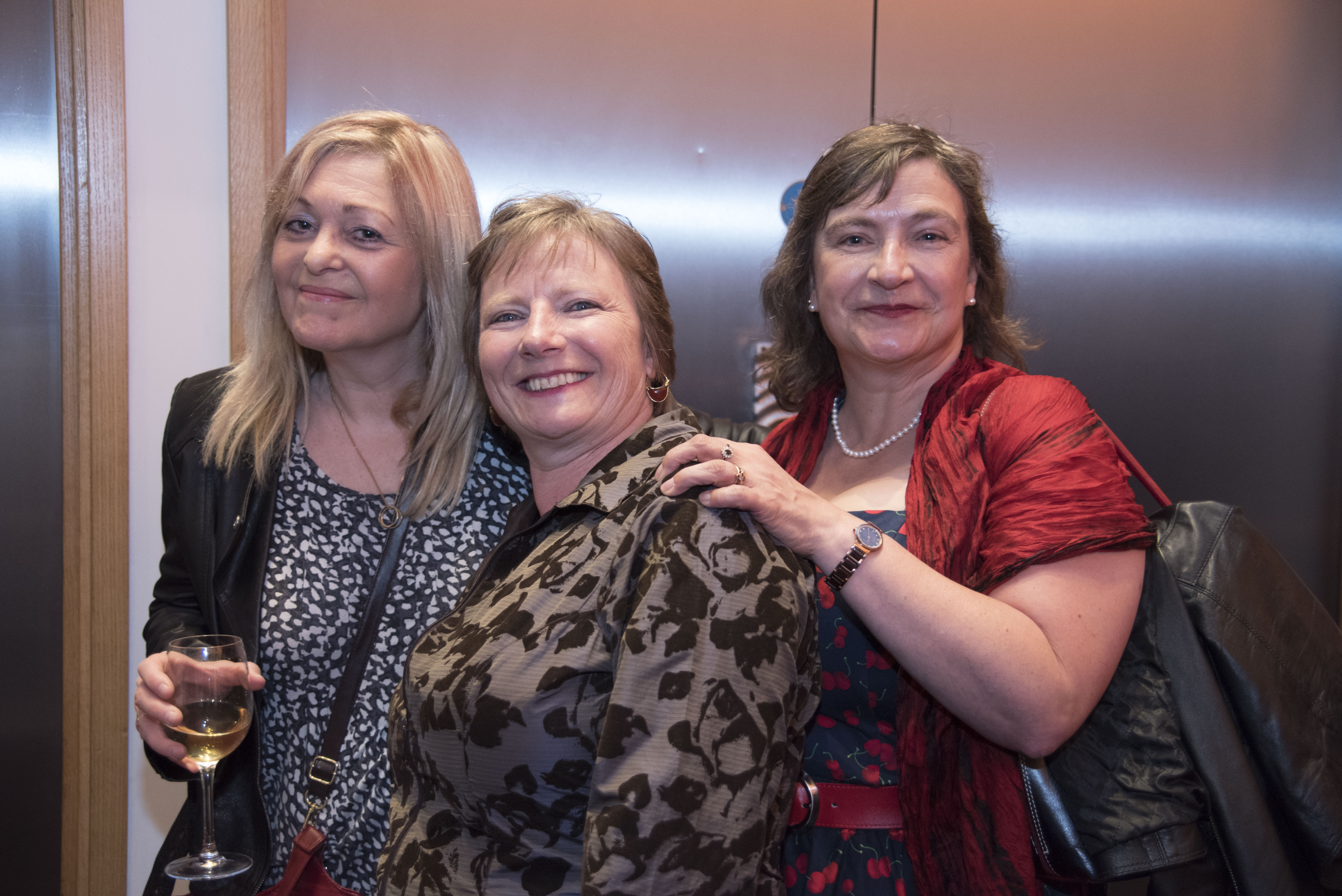
Freya (centre)

She was born Jo Fraser, but changed her name to Jo Freya as a condition of joining the actors' union Equity, which does not allow two of its members to share the same name. She performs mainly folk music and world music and is part of the bands Blowzabella, Old Swan Band and Token Women, as well as performing and / or recording with Lal Waterson, Pete Morton, Maalstroom, and with her sister, Fi Fraser.

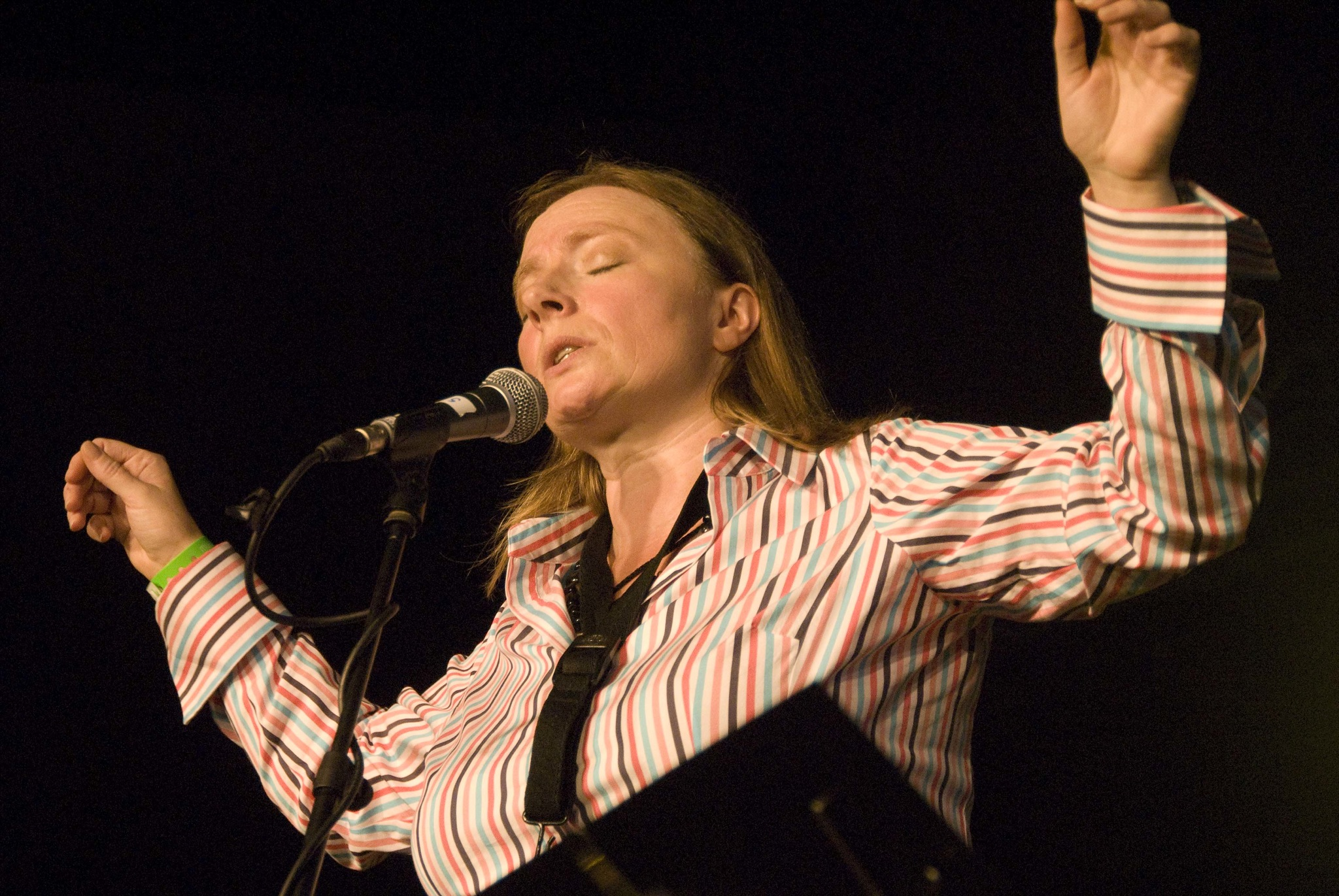

She is part of the Lal Waterson Project, in memory of Waterson and in celebration of her work.

== Discography ==
Solo albums

- Traditional Songs of England (1993)
- Traditional Songs of Wales (1993)
- Lush (1996)
- Lal (2007)
- Female Smuggler (2008)

Anthology

- Migrating Bird – The Songs of Lal Waterson (2007)

With Pete Morton

- Jo Freya & Pete Morton (1997)

As a member of Blowzabella

- A Richer Dust (1988)
- Vanilla (1990)
- Octomento (2007)
- Dance (2010)

As a member of Fraser Sisters

- The Fraser Sisters (1998)
- Going Around (2001)

As a member of Freyja

- Freyja (1996)
- One Bathroom (2001)

As a member of The Old Swan Band

- No Reels (1977)
- Old Swan Brand (1979)
- Gamesters, Pickpockets and Harlots (1981)
- The Old Swan Band (1983)
- Still Swanning After All These Years (1995)
- Swan-Upmanship (2004)

As a member of Tanteeka

- A New Tradition (1997)

As a member of Token Women

- The Rhythm Method (1993)
- Out To Lunch (1995)
- Elsa (2001)

In conjunction with Maalstroom

- Meet (2010)

As a member of Moirai

- Sideways (2015)
- Here and Now (2017)
- Framed: The Alice Wheeldon Story (2019)
