= Hatchet (disambiguation) =

A hatchet is a type of small axe.

Hatchet may also refer to:

== Media ==
=== Film ===
- Hatchet (film series), an American slasher film franchise
  - Hatchet (film), a 2006 slasher film
  - Hatchet II, a 2010 sequel to the first film
  - Hatchet III, a 2013 sequel and third installment of the series
  - Victor Crowley, or Hatchet IV, a 2017 sequel and fourth installment

=== Written works ===
- Hatchet (novel), written in 1987 by Gary Paulsen
- The Hatchet, a 1930 novel by Mihail Sadoveanu
- The GW Hatchet, university publication

=== Music ===
- Hatchet (band), an American thrash metal band
- Psychopathic Records, often referred to as The Hatchet due to the label's logo design
- "Hatchet" (Low song), a song by Low

== Other uses ==
- Hatchet, Alabama, a community in the United States
- Hatchet ribozyme, an RNA structure
- Hatchet (Transformers), a Decepticon in the Transformers fictional universe
- Hatchet, a fictional character in adult animated Prime Original, Hazbin Hotel

== See also ==
- Hatchett, a surname
- Hatchet man (disambiguation)
- Bury the Hatchet (disambiguation)
