= Francis Coxe =

English astrologer and quack doctor (fl. 1560–1575)

Francis Coxe (also called Fraunces Cox; fl. 1560–1575) was an English astrologer and quack physician. He was tried for sorcery in 1561 and severely punished, and his Unfained Retractation was published in a contemporary broadside. He then published a pamphlet against necromancy, and, in 1575, A Treatise of the Making and Use of Diverse Oils, Unguents, Emplasters and Distilled Waters.

== Life ==
Francis Coxe, a quack physician, who attained some celebrity in the sixteenth century, is best known by a curious volume of receipts entitled De oleis, unguentis, emplastris, etc. conficiendis (lit. 'A Treatise of the Making and Use of Diverse Oils, Unguents, Emplasters and Distilled Waters'), London, 1575, 8vo, which is missing. His practices having attracted considerable attention, he was summoned before the privy council on a charge of sorcery, and, having been severely punished, made a public confession of his "employment of certayne sinistral and divelysh artes" at the Pillory in Cheapside on 25 June 1561. On 7 July following John Awdeley issued a broadside entitled The unfained Retractation of Fraunces Cox, a copy of which later entered the library of the Society of Antiquaries. Coxe subsequently published what Edward Heron-Allen calls "a grovelling and terror-stricken pamphlet", entitled A Short Treatise declaring the Detestable Wickednesse of Magicall Sciences, as Necromancie, Coniurations of Spirits, Curiouse Astrologie, and such lyke (London, Jhon [sic] Alde, n.d., black letter, 12mo), written, as he says in the preface thereto, "for that I have myself been an offender in these most detestable sciences, against whome I have compilyd this worke". Coxe may also have written Prognostication, n.d., an almanac, which survives in a single copy on the back of a ballad in the British Library. The dates of his birth and death are not known.

== See also ==
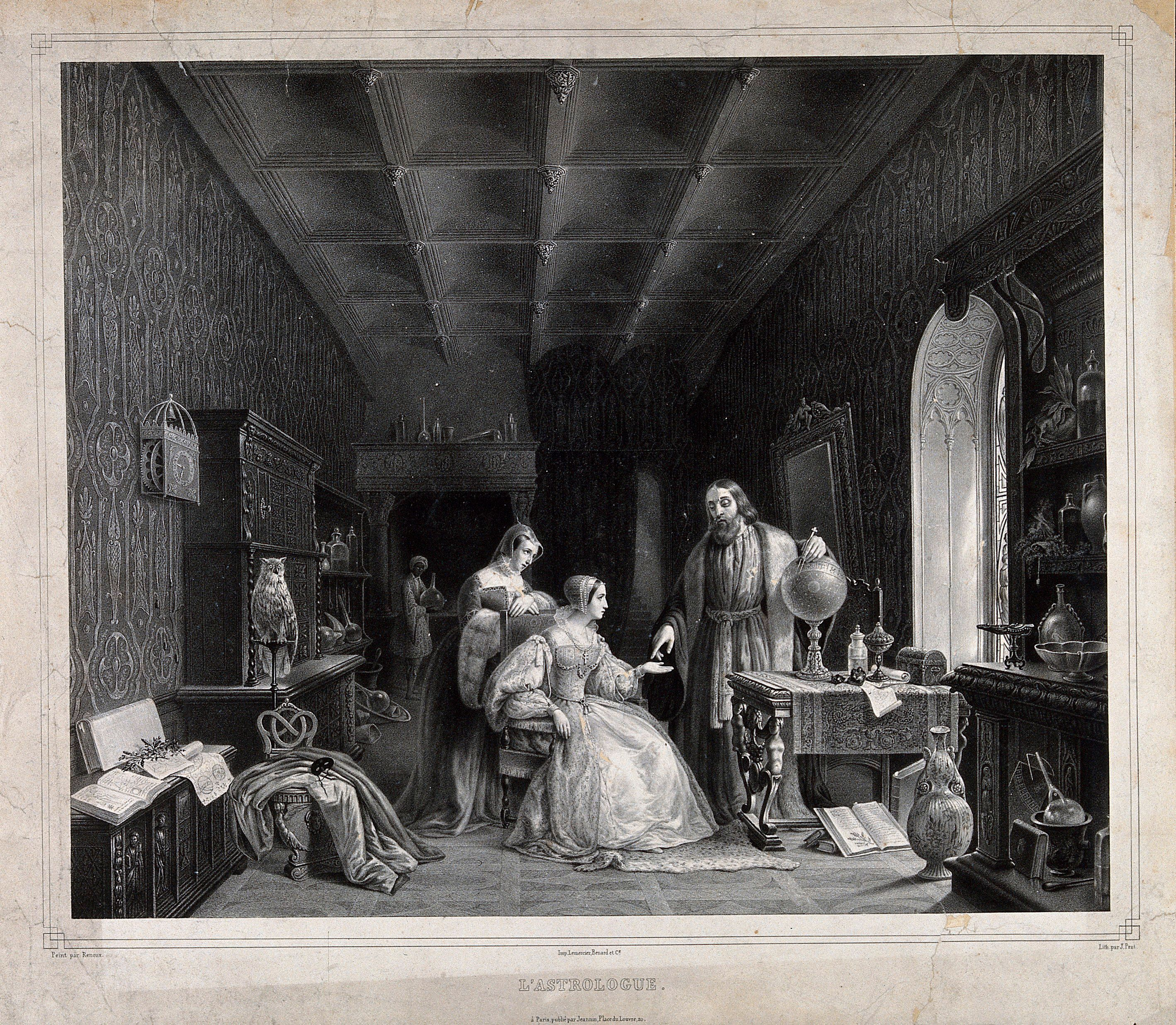
The Astrologer. Lithograph by J. Prat after C. C. Renoux, c. 1835–1841

- Renaissance magic
- Eliseus Bomelius
- John Lambe
- John Securis
- Simon Forman
- William Fulke

== Sources ==
- Heron-Allen, Edward; Kassell, Lauren (2004). "Coxe, Francis [Fraunces Cox] (fl. 1560–1575), astrologer and medical practitioner". Oxford Dictionary of National Biography (online ed.). Oxford University Press. doi:10.1093/ref:odnb/6533. (Subscription, Wikipedia Library access or UK public library membership required.)
- Lemon, Robert (1866). Catalogue of a Collection of Printed Broadsides in the Possession of the Society of Antiquaries of London. Westminster: J. B. Nichols and Sons. p. 19.

Attribution:

- This article incorporates text from a publication now in the public domain: Heron-Allen, Edward (1887). "Coxe, Francis". In Stephen, Leslie (ed.). Dictionary of National Biography. Vol. 12. London: Smith, Elder & Co. pp. 418–419.
