= Hatchett =

Hatchett is a surname. Notable people with the surname include:

- Bo Hatchett, American politician
- Charles Hatchett FRS (1765–1847), English chemist who discovered the element niobium
- Derrick Hatchett (born 1958), former member of the Baltimore Colts from 1980 to 1983
- Ed Hatchett, American attorney and politician from Glasgow, Kentucky
- Glenda Hatchett (born 1951), the former star of the television show, Judge Hatchett
- John Hatchett (fl. 1566), better known as John Securis, English physician and medical writer
- Joseph W. Hatchett (1932–2021), American judge and attorney; the first black man elected to the Florida Supreme Court
- Lewis Hatchett (born 1990), English cricketer
- Marion J. Hatchett (1927–2009), Episcopal priest, scholar, and one of the primary liturgists who shaped the 1979 Book of Common Prayer
- Matt Hatchett (born 1966), American businessman and politician
- Richard Hatchett, American epidemiologist
- Rufus Hatchett (born 1888, date of death unknown), American baseball player
- Seb Feszczur-Hatchett (born 1995), English cricketer
- William Hatchett, companion of English writer, actress and publisher Eliza Haywood (1693–1756)

== See also ==
- Judge Hatchett, nationally syndicated American television program produced and distributed by Sony Pictures Television Distribution
- Hatchet
- Hatchet II
- Hatchet man (disambiguation)
