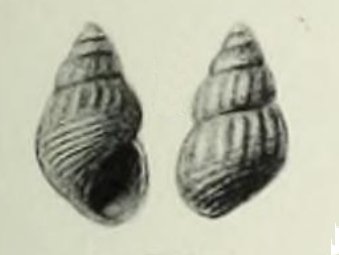
- Shell of Alvania multistriata (holotype)

Scientific classification
- Kingdom: Animalia
- Phylum: Mollusca
- Class: Gastropoda
- Subclass: Caenogastropoda
- Order: Littorinimorpha
- Superfamily: Rissooidea
- Family: Rissoidae
- Genus: Alvania
- Species: †A. multistriata

Binomial name
- †Alvania multistriata (Bell, 1892)

Synonyms
- † Rissoa multistriata Bell, 1892 (Alvania accepted as full genus)

= Alvania multistriata =

Species of gastropod

Alvania multistriata is an extinct species of minute sea snail, a marine gastropod mollusc or micromollusk in the family Rissoidae.

== Description ==
The length of the shell attains 3 mm, its diameter 1.5 mm.

The minute shell has a conical shape, rapidly tapering. It contains 5 convex whorls, the last more than half the total length. it is ornamented by well-marked, closely set spiral ridges, and the lower whorls and the upper part of the last by rather swollen ribs which do not extend far below the suture. The aperture is oval. The outer and inner lip are thin. The umbilicus is minute but deep.

== Distribution ==
Fossils of this species were found in Pliocene strata near Selsey, Great Britain.
