= St Wilfrid's Chapel, Church Norton =

St Wilfrid's Chapel
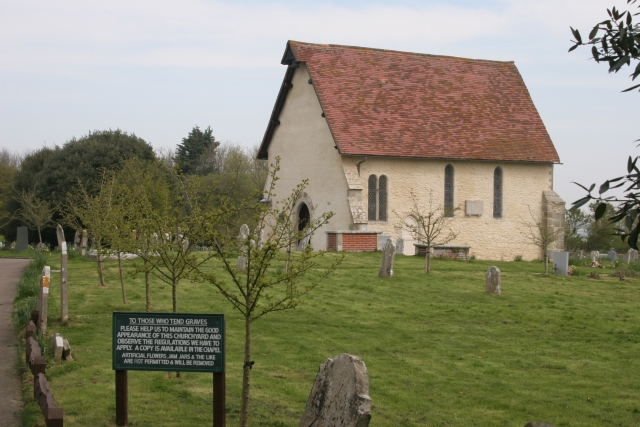
- The chapel from the southwest
- St Wilfrid's Chapel
- 50.7549°N 0.7652°W
- Location: Rectory Lane, Church Norton, Selsey, West Sussex PO20 9DT
- Country: England
- Denomination: Anglican

History
- Former name: St Peter's Church
- Status: Church
- Founded: 13th century
- Dedication: Saint Wilfrid
- Dedicated: 1917 (rededicated to St Wilfrid)

Architecture
- Functional status: Redundant
- Heritage designation: Grade I
- Designated: 5 June 1958

St Wilfrid's Chapel, also known as St Wilfrid's Church and originally as St Peter's Church, is a former Anglican church at Church Norton, a rural location near the village of Selsey in West Sussex, England. In its original, larger form, the church served as Selsey's parish church from the 13th century until the mid 1860s; when half of it was dismantled, moved to the centre of the village and rebuilt along with modern additions. Only the chancel of the old church survived in its harbourside location of "sequestered leafiness", resembling a cemetery chapel in the middle of its graveyard. It was rededicated to St Wilfrid—7th-century founder of a now vanished cathedral at Selsey—and served as a chapel of ease until the Diocese of Chichester declared it redundant in 1990. Since then it has been in the care of the Churches Conservation Trust charity. The tiny chapel, which may occupy the site of an ancient monastery built by St Wilfrid, is protected as a Grade I Listed building.

== History ==
The parish of Selsey is in the far southwestern corner of Sussex and was once an island: the English Channel lies to the east and south, and Pagham Harbour forms the northern boundary and originally had a connection to the sea on the west side as well. Two settlements developed in the parish: the main village (Selsey) and a hamlet called Church Norton (or Norton) about 1 1/2 miles (2.4 km) to the northeast, on the "wild shoreline" of Pagham Harbour.

This land is considered the most likely site of Cymenshore, the place where Ælle of Sussex—the first King of the South Saxons—came ashore in 477. Two centuries later, Wilfrid (later canonised as Saint Wilfrid) Christianised the area, using Selsey as his base. He was apparently granted land on the island in the 7th century, upon which he founded a monastery in 681. This later became a cathedral, and 25 bishops served between 681 and 1075. After the Norman conquest the Council of London, in 1075, decreed that the See should be moved from Selsey to, the nearby former Roman settlement of Chichester. The site chosen for the new cathedral was shared with the original St Peter's church, in Chichester.

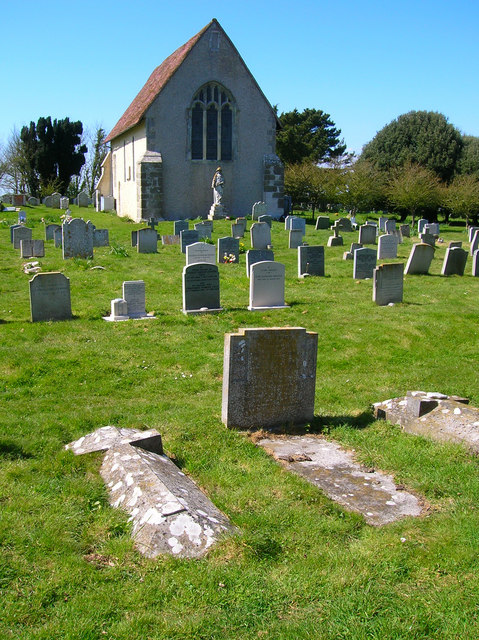
The church, reduced in size in the 1860s, stands like a cemetery chapel in a large graveyard.

Although the monastery, at Selsey, had disappeared by the 11th century, its site was not eroded by the sea and survived as a "delightfully secluded location" on what had become a peninsula. By the late 12th century, a church occupied the isolated site; some sources suggest it may have replaced a Saxon building, but there is very little evidence for this. The church had an aisled and arcaded nave, chancel, bellcot, porch and tower at its greatest extent. The arcades to the original three-bay nave were the oldest structural element, dating from about 1180. Soon after these were installed, the nave was extended by a further bay. The chancel was added in the early 13th century and had plain lancet windows in the side walls. An east window in the Perpendicular Gothic style was added later, as were windows in the aisles (inserted in the 15th century), and a tower with diagonal buttresses was erected at the west end in the 16th century.

Selsey village grew after 670 acres (270 ha) of common land were enclosed in 1830: new roads and housing were built, and it became a minor seaside resort. Church Norton's remoteness from the centre of population encouraged the construction of a new church on Selsey High Street. The old church, which at this time was still dedicated to St Peter, was partly demolished—only its chancel was left standing—and some of the material was incorporated in the new church, also called St Peter's Church and designed by J.P. St Aubyn. The year in which this happened is given variously as 1864, 1865 and 1866.

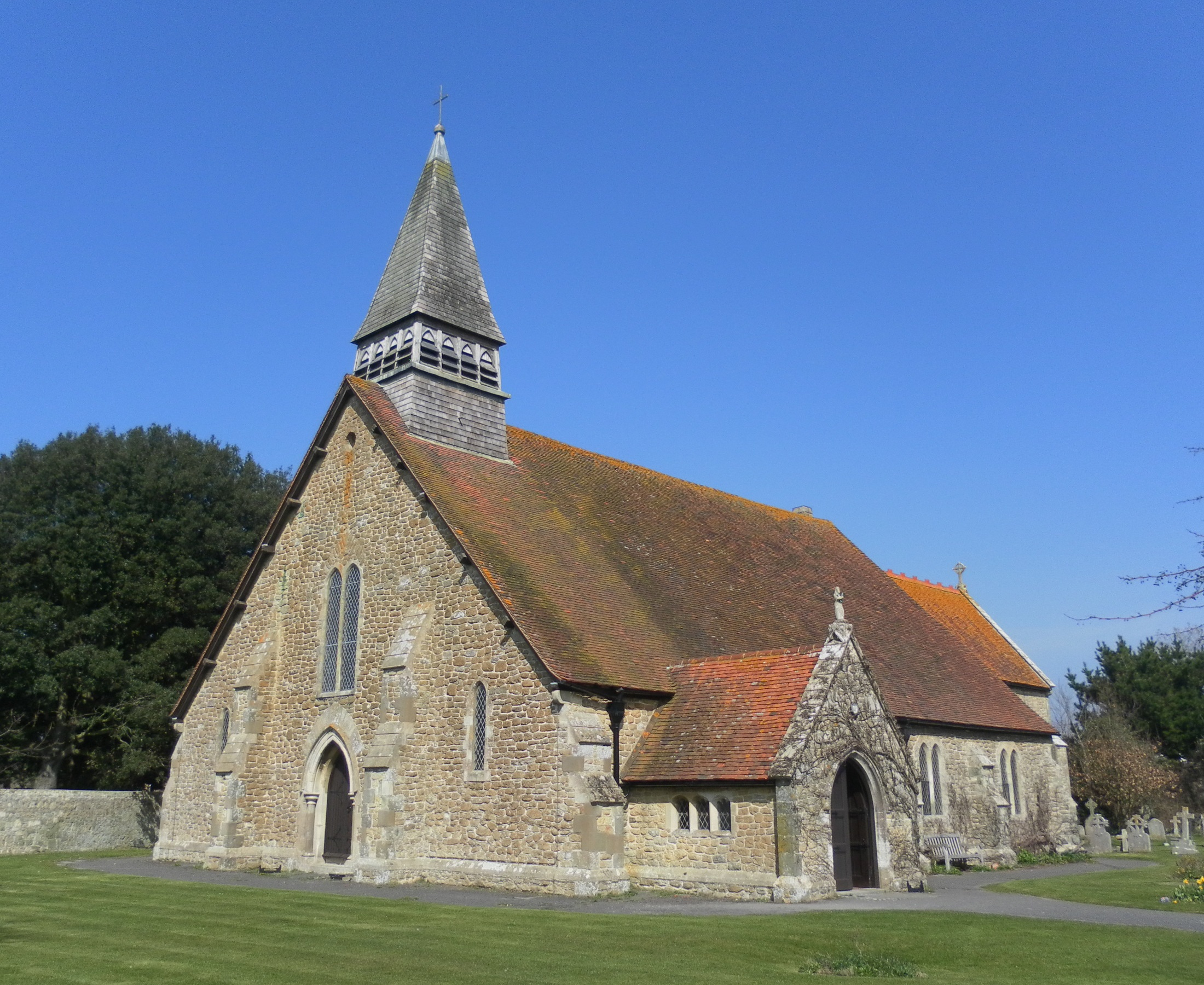
Much of the structure was moved to the centre of Selsey and rebuilt as St Peter's Church.

According to Edward Heron-Allen a meeting was held in the vestry of the old church, on 1 July 1864, with eight people and the rector in attendance. The purpose of the meeting was to authorise the raising of £600 towards the expenses of the removal of the church. The remainder of the cost, £3000, was to be paid by the Lady of the manor, a Mrs Vernon-Harcourt. (Note: Caroline Mary (Peachey) Vernon Harcourt (1785-1871), Lady of the Manor was the daughter of John Peachey, 2nd Baron Selsey and lived at West Dean.) Mrs Vernon-Harcourt also presented the village with a site for the new church. However, the scheme was opposed by some as they did not want to see the disappearance of a fine old Early-English church; it was therefore agreed that the old church, apart from the chancel, should be moved to the new site stone by stone. On 24 November 1864, the churchwardens and overseers borrowed £600 required to make up the cost of removal under an act of Parliament, and the removal was started. The building work was completed in 1865, and the new church reconsecrated on 12 April 1866.

Structural elements and fittings moved from Church Norton to the new parish church included a Norman-era font, pillars, arches and three bays of pointed-arched arcading from the nave, a bell cast in 1844 by Mears & Co. of the Whitechapel Bell Foundry, and some Eucharistic objects from the 16th to the 18th centuries. The arcading had chamfering and scallop-shaped capitals. Initially the rectory continued to be at Norton, but in 1902 it was sold and a new one built on land adjoining the relocated church. This work was completed in 1903. The name of the old rectory was changed to Norton Priory.

The old church functioned as a cemetery chapel for the next few decades, standing in the middle of its graveyard. In 1906, it was fitted out with some internal fixtures from the recently demolished St Martin's Church at Chichester, including a font, and in 1917 the church was rededicated to St Wilfrid by the Bishop of Chichester. By this time the chapel was within the parish of the new St Peter's Church, Some services continued, and stained glass was added in 1969 and 1982. In 1990, the chapel was declared redundant by the Diocese of Chichester, and services ceased except for special occasions.

The church was the subject of a poem by Rudyard Kipling. Eddi's Service, from the 1910 book Rewards and Fairies, describes how Eddi the priest was determined to celebrate Midnight Mass one stormy Christmas Eve despite no parishioners attending. "I must go on with the service/For such as care to attend" he announced; and when the candles were lit for the start of the service, an old donkey and a "wet, yoke-weary bullock" wandered into the church and stayed until dawn broke, listening to Eddi preaching. The tale is apocryphal—and may have been based on a traditional story local to the Manhood Peninsula—but Wilfrid's own chaplain during his ministry at Selsey was Eddius Stephanus (Stephen of Ripon), which inspired the name of the priest.

=== Marriage Act ===
When the removed church was re-consecrated in April 1866, due to an oversight it was not consecrated properly to carry out marriages. The omission was not discovered until 1904, by which time 196 marriage services had taken place. These services although canonically correct were not strictly legal. To rectify the situation an Act of Parliament was required. (Note: Provisional Order (Marriages) Act 1905 (5 Edward VII c.23)) In 1906 an order (Note: Provisional Order (Marriages) Confirmation Act 1906 (6 Edward VII., c.26)) was made to finally validate all the marriages celebrated between 12 April 1866 and 25 February 1904.

== Architecture and fittings ==
Originally the church had an aisled nave with a four-bay arcade (three bays dating from the 1180s and another added about 50 years later), a porch and a 16th-century tower with diagonal buttresses. This was never finished and stood only 8 feet (2.4 m) high. The remaining chancel of the church is a simple Early English Gothic building with original lancet windows in the north and south walls. The three-light east window dates from the 15th century and is Perpendicular Gothic in style. Traces of the former chancel arch and the responds of the arcades are still visible on the west wall. The fact that the church is "divided into two halves and standing in two different places" has led to it being described as "one of the oddest in England".

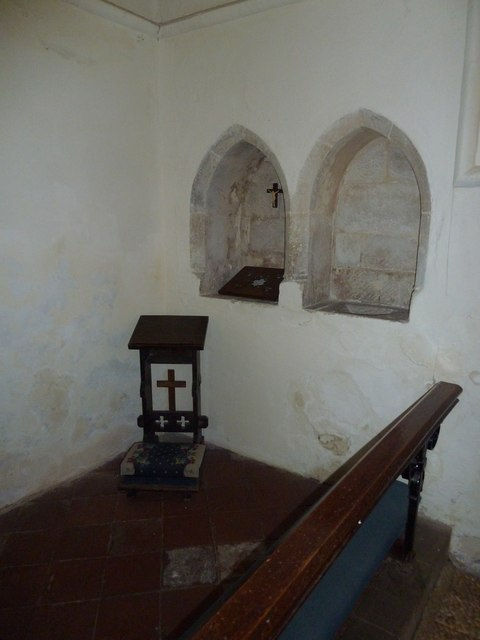
The St Wilfrid's Chapel piscina in the right recess

There are two recesses in the south wall, one of which is used as a piscina. Another ancient fixture that remains is a roughly executed carving of John Lewis (or Lews) and his wife Agnes, dated 1537. In the form of a triptych, it shows them kneeling and facing a central panel which has now been defaced beyond recognition but which would have shown a Crucifixion or Trinity scene. It occupies a recess in the north wall and is carved from Caen stone. Next to it, another carving depicts St George and the "gruesome martyrdom" of St Agatha. Ian Nairn described its style as characteristic of the area and its date: "combining kneeling figures with purely Gothic and purely religious subjects".

The 20th-century stained glass consists of a 1969 window by Carl Edwards, commemorating women and featuring an image of the now demolished All Saints Cathedral in Cairo, and a 1982 piece by Michael Farrar-Bell which portrays the nature reserve at Pagham Harbour and its animals and birds.

== The church today ==
St Wilfrid's Chapel was listed as a Grade I listed building on 5 June 1958.

The Diocese of Chichester declared the chapel redundant on 1 November 1990. It was placed into the care of the Redundant Churches Fund (now the Churches Conservation Trust) from that date, and is now one of five former churches in West Sussex administered by the charity; the others are at Chichester, North Stoke, Tortington and Warminghurst.

As of 2006, services were still held irregularly at the church, in particular on the feast day of Saint Wilfrid (12 October).

== See also ==
- Grade I listed buildings in West Sussex
- List of churches preserved by the Churches Conservation Trust in Southeast England
- List of former places of worship in Chichester (district)
- Manhood Peninsula
- Selsey Abbey
