= Bury the Hatchet =

Bury the hatchet is an American English colloquialism, referring to a Native American custom.

Bury the Hatchet may also refer to:

- Bury the Hatchet (film), a 2010 documentary film on Mardi Gras in New Orleans, Louisiana
- Bury the Hatchet (album), a 1999 album by the Irish rock band The Cranberries
- "Bury the Hatchet", a song from the album Kezia by the Canadian band Protest the Hero
- ”Bury the Hatchet”, a mission in Grand Theft Auto V story mode
