= Norton Priory, Church Norton =

Norton Priory
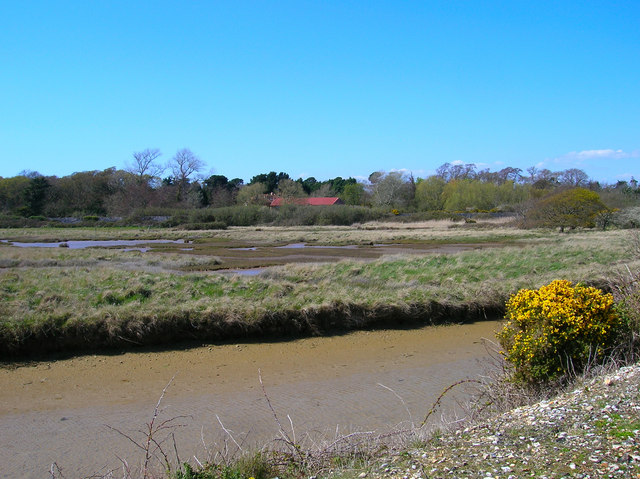
- Looking across bird sanctuary from Pagham Harbour
- Interactive map of Norton Priory
- 50.75216°N 0.76526°W
- Location: Selsey Rectory Lane, Church Norton, West Sussex PO20 9DT, United Kingdom

History
- Built: Circa 16th century or earlier

Site notes
- Architectural style: Vernacular

Listed Building – Grade II
- Designated: 5 June 1958
- Reference no.: 1026239

Norton Priory is the former rectory of St Wilfrid's Chapel, Church Norton, West Sussex. The building is claimed to be of mediaeval origin, but so altered that much of the history of its construction is speculation. Some parts are from the 17th century, while a fireplace in the west wing bears the inscription "WL 1539".
