= St Peter's Church, Selsey =

St Peter's Church
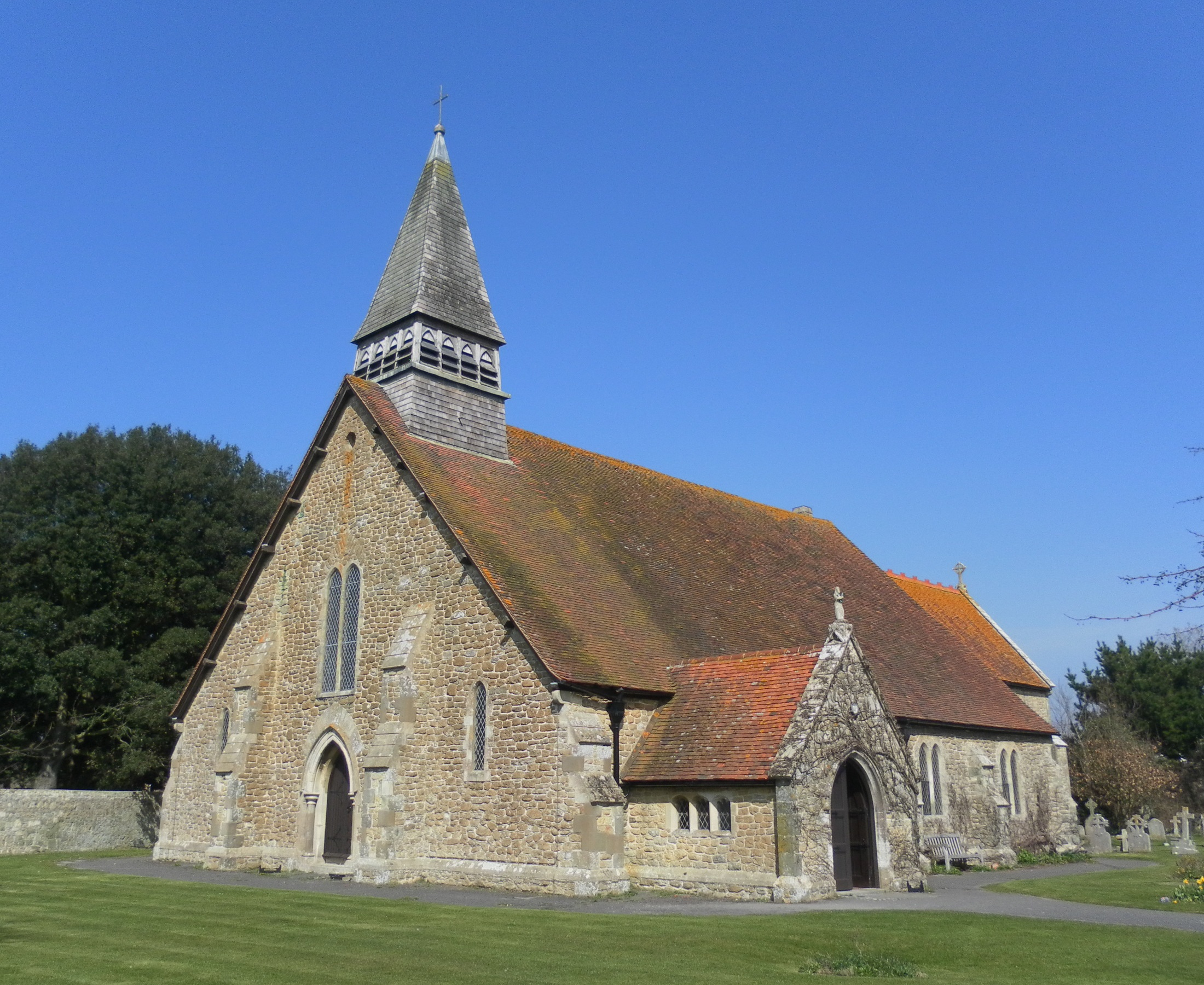
- The church from the south-southeast
- St Peter's Church
- 50.7369°N 0.7884°W
- Location: High Street/St Peter's Crescent, Selsey, West Sussex, PO20 0NP
- Country: England
- Denomination: Church of England
- Website: http://www.stpetersselsey.com

History
- Status: Parish church
- Founded: 13th century
- Dedication: St Peter

Architecture
- Functional status: Active
- Style: Norman with Victorian Chancel

Administration
- Province: Canterbury
- Diocese: Chichester
- Archdeaconry: Chichester
- Deanery: Chichester
- Parish: Selsey

Clergy
- Priest: Fr Andy Wilkes (from 22.7.15)

St Peter's Church is the parish church of Selsey, West Sussex, and dates from the 13th century. The church building was originally situated at the location of St Wilfrid's first monastery and cathedral at Church Norton some 2 miles north of the present centre of population. The church is a Grade II listed building, and there has been extensive renovation work on and inside the building.

== History ==
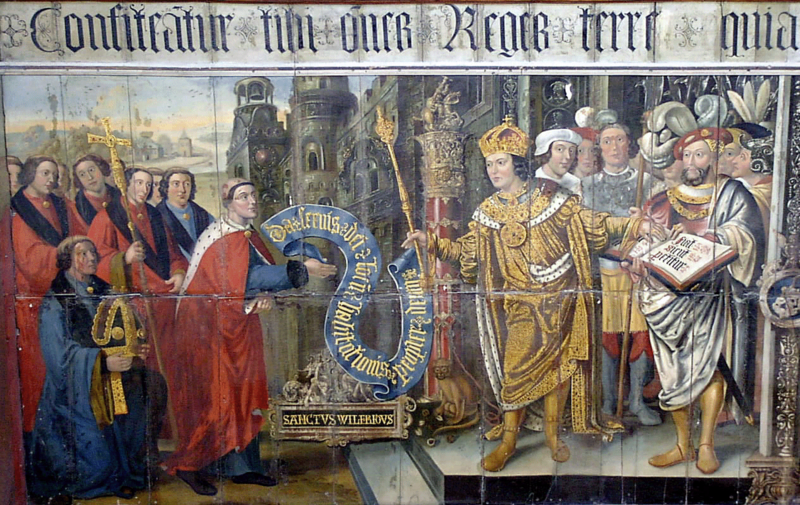
16th-century mural showing Cædwalla granting lands to Wilfrid

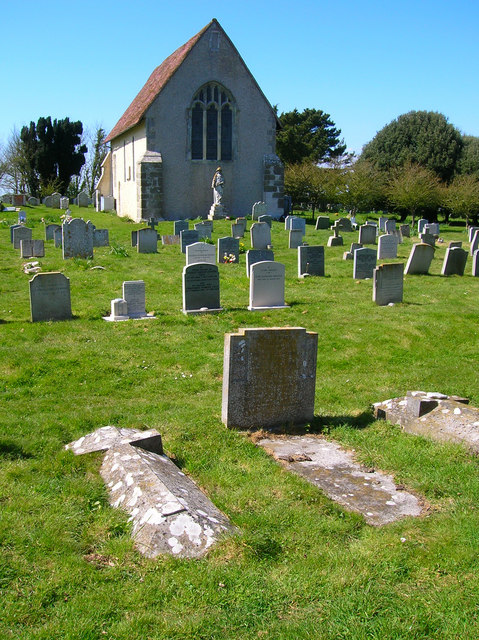
St Wilfrid's Chapel, Church Norton

According to Bede, St Wilfrid, the exiled Bishop of York, c. 680–81 evangelised the South Saxons during his stay there (c. 680–86). Wilfrid founded a monastery at Selsey, a former royal estate given to him by King Aethelwealh at the entrance to Pagham Harbour (modern-day Church Norton). After Caedwalla conquered the South Saxons c. 685, the area became part of the Diocese of Wessex, with its seat in Winchester. However, the bishopric of Sussex was re-established in about 705, and Wilfrid's monastery was taken over as the episcopal seat.

A picture painted by Lambert Barnard, which hangs in Chichester Cathedral, represents the interview between Caedwalla and St Wilfrid. In the top left corner can be seen a representation of Selsey Church and the priory as it appeared in 1519. It is probable that the bell tower, shown separate from the church on the Barnard painting, dated from the 11th century or earlier was constructed as some sort of fortification and not actually part of the church. A churchwarden's presentment (Note: Churchwardens' Presentments are reports to the Bishop relating to parishioners' misdemeanors and other things amiss in the parish) from 1662 stated "That there was never any steeple belonging to the church (at Selsey), but a tower formerly belonging to a ruined castle, somewhat remote from the church where the bells hung...". An excavation of the mound in 1911 discovered the foundations of a square tower and the remains of a ringwork that would have supported the tower. It seems that the old tower lasted till 1602 when it blew down. A replacement tower was constructed, this time attached to the church, in 1662.

In 1075, the see was transferred to Chichester. The location of the old Selsey cathedral is not known for certain, and although some local legends suggest it is under the sea, and that the bell could be heard tolling during rough weather, it is thought unlikely. A more likely explanation is that the replacement church, founded in the 13th century, was built on the site of the old cathedral. (Note: By about 1200 almost every Anglo-Saxon cathedral and abbey had been demolished and replaced with Norman style architecture, as a result no great Anglo-Saxon church has survived to modern times)

By the middle of the 19th century, the population had drifted away to Sutton (modern day Selsey), largely because of coastal erosion. It was therefore decided to move the church to the new centre of population. In 1864–66 the church was dismantled stone by stone and re-erected in its present position where it was orientated north rather than east. The chancel remained at Church Norton and was dedicated to St Wilfrid in 1917 and is known as St Wilfrid's Chapel. (Note: It is currently in the care of a national charity, the Churches Conservation Trust.) A new Victorian chancel was added to the mediaeval nave. The re-erected parish church, complete with the new chancel, was consecrated on 12 April 1866. The rectors continued to live in the rectory at Church Norton until a new rectory was built near the removed church in 1903. The old rectory was sold off and renamed Norton Priory.

== Building ==
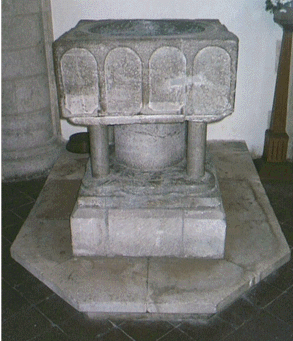
The font c. 12th century

The church originally stood at Church Norton, until the 19th century when it was moved to the current centre of population. Under ecclesiastical law, the church can be removed but not the chancel. So the old chancel was left.

Plans were made of the church in its original position. James Piers St Aubyn was appointed architect in 1865. The re-erected church therefore was the same as the original church, apart from the addition of a new Victorian chancel and a vestry. The re-erected church consists of two arcades of three bays each between the nave and the aisles, originally built in the late 12th century.

The east window is of three trefoil-headed lights with Perpendicular tracery, perhaps late 14th century; the rear-arch may be that of a former lancet triplet.

In the south wall are two pointed-headed niches with chamfered arrises, the eastern is now a credence, the western a piscina; though the style of these suggests a later date than the 13th century the original moulded string-course which runs round the south, east, and north sides of the chancel rises to clear them. Next are two 13th-century lancets with segmental rear-arches, and a priest's doorway with plain pointed exterior arch, 13th century but much repaired with cement, and segmental rear-arch; this is now blocked externally, and its recess serves as a cupboard. Next is a two-light window without tracery, the lights having semicircular heads, perhaps a 17th-century enlargement to light a reading-desk, the inner part of the splay and the rear-arch being those of a 13th-century lancet.

In the north wall are two lancets like those in the south; perhaps a third, now blocked, exists west of them. On the outside of this wall there is a weather-mould where the roof of a building adjoined it on the north.

The church has a chalice dating from Elizabethan times and also an ancient font. The architect Ian Nairn, dated the font as being constructed at around 1100. However, this was seen as a little early by other historians. The font, which is made of Purbeck marble, Heron-Allen suggests was of a type that was very common in the south east counties in the 12th century, having shallow bodies with circular basins standing upon a square base and supported by a large central and small angle shafts. The architect Philip Mainwaring Johnston was responsible for the reredos. The church is a Grade II listed building.

== See also ==
- Bishop of Selsey
- Bishop of Chichester
- List of current places of worship in Chichester (district)
