= Selsey Abbey =

Former abbey in Selsey, West Sussex, England

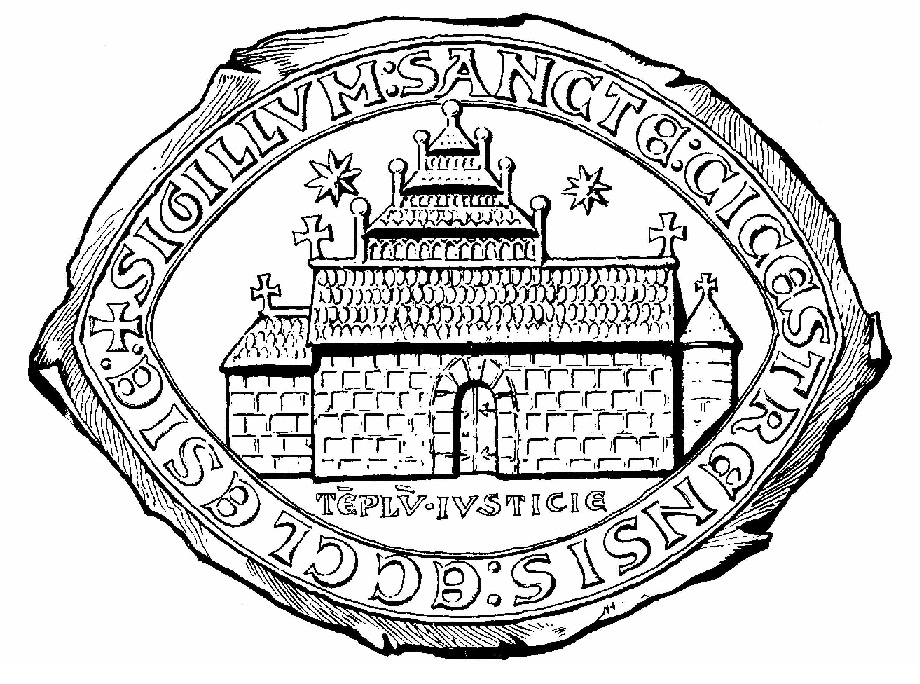
- Capitular seal with picture of Selsey Cathedral? (Note: The seal (was) used by Chichester cathedral authorities down to Bishop Seffrid II(1180 – 1204). The seal shows the nave, chancel, and round-headed doorway, with a detached circular western tower; the roof apparently of thatch or shingles: on the roof a superstructure in three arcaded stories with pinnacles.)
- Interactive map of Selsey Abbey

Monastery information
- Order: Benedictine
- Established: c. 681
- Disestablished: c. 1075 community moved to Chichester
- Dedication: St Peter? (Note: Early charters also say that it could have been dedicated to the Virgin Mary and St Paul the Apostle.)

People
- Founder: St Wilfrid

Site
- Location: Church Norton; Selsey; West Sussex; England
- Coordinates: 50°45′17″N 00°45′54″W

Selsey Abbey was founded by St Wilfrid in AD 681 on land donated at Selsey by the local Anglo-Saxon ruler, King Æðelwealh of Sussex. According to the Venerable Bede the Kingdom of Sussex was the last area of mainland England to be evangelised.

The abbey became the seat of the Sussex bishopric, until it was moved to Chichester, after 1075 when the Council of London decreed that sees should be centred in cities not in villages. The location of the abbey was probably at the site of, what became, the old parish church at Church Norton just north of modern-day Selsey.

== Historical context ==
The traditional founder (Note: It is possible that Wilfrid used a pre-existing monastery as the site of his abbey, rather than build from scratch.)of Selsey Abbey is given as St Wilfrid of Northumbria. Wilfrid had spent most of his career in exile having quarrelled with various kings and bishops.The exiled Wilfrid arrived in the kingdom of the South Saxons in 681 and remained there for five years evangelising and baptising the people. The account given by Wilfrid's biographer Stephen of Ripon in his Vita Sancti Wilfrithi ("Life of Saint Wilfrid") infers that all of the South Saxons were pagan. The historian David Peter Kirby suggests that Stephen's "Life of Wilfrid" was extremely partisan, as its purpose was to magnify Wilfrid as well as vindicate him. Bede's "Ecclesiastical History" takes a more nuanced view than "Life". Modern academics have suggested that this ambiguity is because Bede did not approve of Wilfrid and did not simply copy Stephen's "Life". Henry Mayr-Harting writes that it would have been easy for Bede just to copy from Stephen's "Life" into his own "Ecclesiastical History", but experience equipped him to deal with the "difficulty of sources", Mayr-Harting also suggests that Bede would have had an independent source of information about Wilfrid, specifically from his scholarly friend Acca, the Bishop of Hexham.

The "Ecclesiastical History" says that the local king Æðelwealh and his wife Eafe plus the leading thegns and soldiers had already been baptised in Mercia; he then goes on to say that only Queen Eafe was baptised. (Note: Eafe parents were Christian so it is unlikely that she needed converting as she would heve been baptised from birth.) Also when Wilfrid arrived in Sussex, there was a small community of five or six Irish monks (Note: It would not have been unusual to have found Irish monks in Sussex as during this period it was common to follow the Doctrine of Peregrinatio, a self-imposed exile to serve God. The early Christian and medieval idea of estrangement, of peregrinatio, which is of biblical origin, found in for instance, in the 'Second Letter to the Corinthians', in the 'First Letter of St Peter', and in 'Hebrews', as well as in the Old Testament, was a conception which saw true Christians as a band of strangers, of pilgrims, wending their way through the terrestrial world; it was an idea of homelessness or exile in this world, because of the latter's imperfect, preliminary condition and because of a desire to serve only God, by cutting all lesser ties. Also, the South of England generally was part of the overland route for the Irish travelling to the continent.) led by Dicul in Bosham; however according to Bede they had made little headway in evangelising the local people.

Kirby writes that Æðelwealh's bride Eafe was the daughter of Wulfhere, the Christian king of Mercia, and that Æðelwealh and his nobles would have been baptised at the Mercian court. On their return to Sussex, Wulfhere will have sent a number of priests with them, to baptise the ordinary people. Kirby further speculates that Christianity may have secured a foothold in early Sussex via one of its sons, the South Saxon Damian, bishop of Rochester c. 660. A more recent hypothesis, posited by the historian Michael Shapland, suggests that "there were likely several British (Note: It is known that Wilfrid did not like the British church (also called the Insular or Gaelic church). Wulfhere would have adhered to the insular tradition and it is possible that the people of Sussex were already Insular Christians. Stephen would have suppressed this knowledge in the "Life of Wilfrid" and Bede in his "History". The formative narrative of Sussex by Stephen and Bede has many anomalies in it, that have been questioned by modern academics.) churches in the area that predate the possibly biased historical accounts of Wilfred's successful Christianisation of Sussex".

Shapland also says that the choice of Selsey over the Roman city of Chichester seems illogical and that Wilfred chose an existing church in Selsey and claimed it as his Cathedral as part of a political maneuver.

== Foundation and removal ==
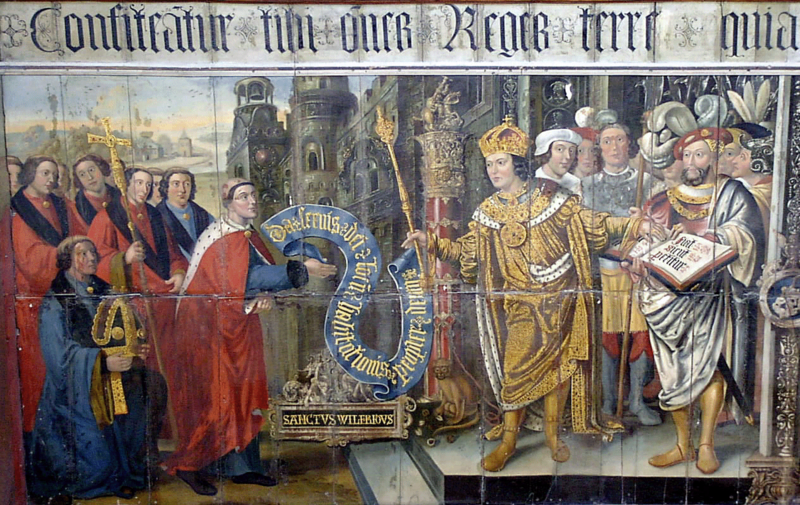
16th-century Lambert Barnard picture of Cædwalla granting lands to Wilfrid

The local monarch, Æðelwealh gave Wilfrid a royal vill and 87 hides to build a monastery at Selsey. Bede says that one of Wilfrid's first acts was to free 250 slaves, who came with the estate, and baptise them. Wilfrid then went on to perform the "deeds of Bishop" (Note: Although Wilfrid established a monastic community in Selsey, there are no early sources that describe him as Bishop of the South Saxons. Wilfrid is credited with being first Bishop of the South Saxons, by William of Malmesbury and Florence of Worcester, also on some later Ecclesiastical lists, but as he was still Bishop of Northumbria when in charge of Selsey Abbey under church law he could not have been bishop of two diocese. As Sussex had been annexed by Wessex then Selsey probably would have been subject to the Diocese of the West Saxons, when Wilfrid was there.) in the area.

A 10th-century forged (Note: In the middle of the 10th century, Brihthelm was bishop of Selsey. Brihthelm was involved in a dispute over the ownership of some of the churches land. He claimed that it had been fraudulently seized from the Selsey see by a certain Ælfsige, against the canons of the Council of Nicaea (325), when he was raised to the episcopal seat of the 'Gewisse' (West Saxons). Several historians have suggested that the Council of Nicaea reference that bishops should not take over another bishops land infers that the Ælfsige who seized the lands at Selsey, would have been a bishop. The most likely candidate was the Bishop of Winchester (whose name was also Ælfsige) and according to Bede the South Saxon Church was subject to the Bishops of Winchester at the time. Historians have surmised that the foundation charter was forged to support Brihthelm's claim against Ælfsige.) foundation charter credits Cædwalla with confirming the grant of land to Wilfrid.

Cædwalla was a West Saxon prince who had apparently been banished by Centwine, king of Wessex Cædwalla had spent his exile in the forests of the Chiltern and the Weald, and at some point had befriended Wilfrid. Cædwalla vowed that if Wilfrid would be his spiritual father then he would be his obedient son. After entering into this compact, they faithfully fulfilled it, with Wilfrid providing the exile with all kinds of aid.

Eventually, Cædwalla invaded the kingdom of the South Saxons and slew King Æðelwealh. Æðelwealh's successors, Berthun and Andhun, drove Cædwalla out, but after the death of Centwine, Cædwalla was able to become King of the West Saxons. He then conquered the South Saxons, killing Berthun in the process. Cædwalla immediately summoned Wilfrid and made him supreme counsellor over his whole kingdom.

In about 686 Archbishop Theodore resolved to arbitrate between the various parties to end Wilfrid's exile. He was successful in his efforts and Wilfrid returned north. With Wilfrid gone, Selsey was absorbed by the Diocese of the West Saxons, at Winchester. In temporal matters Sussex was subject to the West Saxon kings, and in ecclesiastical matters it was subject to the bishops of Winchester. By AD 705 the West Saxon Diocese had grown to such a size that it became unwieldy to manage, so King Ine, Cædwalla's successor, resolved with his witan to divide the great diocese Accordingly, a new see was created at Sherborne and four years later the See of Selsey was created. Wilfrid had been in charge of the religious community at Selsey. When he left he probably would have nominated a president, and any subsequent vacancy would have been filled by election. Abbot Eadberht of Selsey would have been president of the brotherhood in 709 and according to Bede was consecrated the first Bishop of the South Saxons Diocese by synodal decree.

From the time of Wilfrid till after the Norman Conquest, when the See was transferred to Chichester, there were about twenty-two Bishops over a period of 370 years. By the time of the Domesday Book, the See of Sussex was probably the poorest bishopric in the country.

The See was transferred, to Chichester, after the Council of London of 1075 decreed that Sees should be centred in cities. Some sources claim that Stigand, who was bishop at the time of the transfer, continued to use the title Bishop of Selsey until 1082, before adopting the new title of Bishop of Chichester, indicating that the move took several years to complete, with work on the new cathedral not being commenced until the 1090s.

There is a dearth of documents for the early church in Sussex, with gaps in the lists. Most of the documents that do survive are later copies or forgeries, which has made it impossible to reconstruct a detailed history before the Norman Conquest.

== Location ==
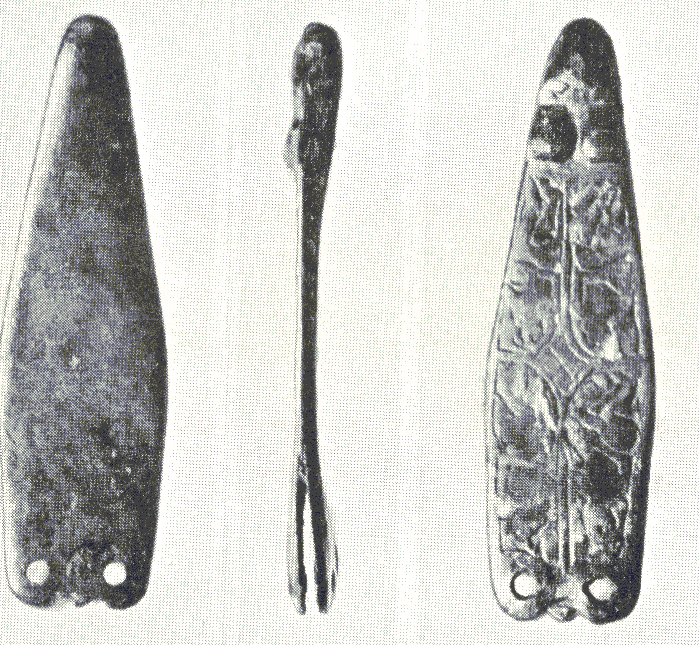
Bronze Anglo-Saxon tab

The location of the old Selsey Abbey and cathedral church is not known for sure, although some local legends suggest that it is under the sea, and that the bell can be heard tolling during rough weather. This is thought not to be true and probably was due to Camden's reference to:

....some obscure remains of that ancient little city, in which those Bishops resided, covered at high water, but plainly visible at low water.

— Camden 2009, Chapter 18.2

The area that Camden refers to is the reef known as "The Mixon", although undersea now it was habitable during the 11th century. This added to the narrative, that the old cathedral was drowned. Another hypothesis suggests that the site of the submerged cathedral is an area of sea off Selsey known as "The Park", a former deer park that was the possession of the Bishops of Chichester.

Wilfrid's church, in reality, was more likely to have been at the site of, what became, the old 13th century parish church at Church Norton.

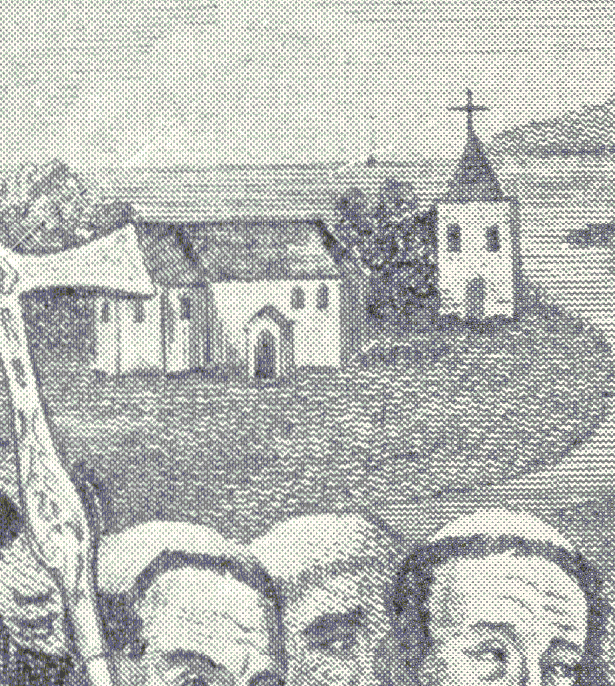
Top left section of the Barnard painting showing the old Church with separate tower

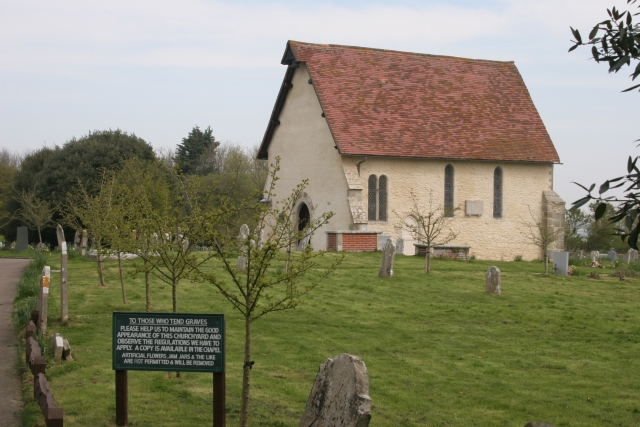
Possible site of Wilfrids cathedral. All that remains of the old Church, the chancel known as St Wilfrid's Chapel, Church Norton.

There is some supporting evidence for this. An excavation, in 1911, of the 'mound' that adjoins the current St Wilfrid's chapel yielded a 10th-century bronze belt tab of a type found in ecclesiastical contexts. Also various stone artefacts have been found in the area including remnants of Wilfrid's palm cross, that would have stood outside his cathedral. The design on the remains of the cross are similar to those on the Bewcastle Cross and it is thought that the Selsey cross would have been identical to the one at Bewcastle. Bishop William Reade, in his will dated 1382, requested that he should be buried before the high altar of the church at "Selsey ... once the cathedral church of my diocese".

In another will dated 1545, Geoffrey Thomson, a Rector of Selsey, asked to be buried next to the palm cross in the churchyard.

On the top left of the painting that hangs in the south transept of Chichester Cathedral, created by the early Tudor painter Lambert Barnard, is a representation of the old church and bell tower at Church Norton as it appeared in the 16th century. The 1911 excavation of the mound revealed some strong stone foundations for a square tower and the remains of a ringwork. It is probable that the foundations were for the bell tower, shown separate from the church on the Barnard painting. The tower would have been constructed in the 11th century or earlier as a fortification and not actually part of the church. A churchwarden's presentment from 1662 stated that:

...there was never any steeple belonging to the church [at Selsey], but a tower formerly belonging to a ruined castle, somewhat remote from the church where the bells hung...

— Aldsworth 1979, pp. 103–107

Another significant piece of evidence is a 13th-century Chichester cathedral capitulary seal. The picture on it is thought to represent the old Selsey Cathedral. It depicts a typical Saxon church with a separate tower. The old tower next to the church lasted till 1602 when it blew down. A replacement tower was constructed, this time attached to the church, in 1662. The ringwork was possibly established soon after 1066 and as the bishopric was not moved to Chichester till after 1075, it is likely that it was constructed to protect Wilfrid's 7th-century church

== Plague and pestilence ==
In 681, while Eappa was Abbot at the Monastery, the country was ravaged by a plague. As the monastery was also badly afflicted by this disease, the monks set apart three days of fasting and prayer to try to placate the Divine Wrath.

A young boy, in his prayers, appealed to Saint Oswald. Then Saint Peter and Saint Paul were said to have appeared to the boy, at Oswalds request. They told him that all in the Monastery would be cured of the plague apart from the boy. According to Bede:

In the monastery at this time lived a Saxon boy, who had recently been converted to the Faith; this child had caught the disease, and for a long time had been confined to bed. About the second hour on the second day of prayer and fasting, he was alone in the place where he lay sick, when, under divine providence, the most blessed Princes of the Apostles deigned to appear to him; for he was a boy of innocent and gentle disposition, who sincerely believed the truths of the Faith that had been accepted. The Apostles greeted him very lovingly, and said: 'Son, put aside the fear of death that is troubling you; for today we are going to take you with us to the kingdom of heaven. But first of all you must wait until the Masses are said, and you have received the Viaticum of the Body and Blood of our Lord. Then you shall be set free from sickness and death, and carried up to the endless joys of heaven. So call the priest Eappa and tell him that our Lord has heard the prayers of the brethren and regarded their fasting and devotion with favour. No one else in this monastery and its possessions is to die of this disease, and all who are now suffering from it will recover and be restored to their former health. You alone are to be set free by death today, and shall be taken to heaven to see the Lord Christ whom you have served so faithfully. God in his mercy has granted you this favour at the intercession of the devout King Oswald, so beloved by God, who once ruled the people of the Northumbrians.

— Bede 1990, Book 4 Chapter 14

== Chichester 950 Way ==
As part of the celebrations, for Chichester Cathedrals 950 years since its foundation, a Pilgrims way was created between the site of Wilfrid's original Cathedral and the current cathedral in Chichester.

== Fictional reference ==
Rudyard Kipling wrote about St Wilfrid and Selsey and in this poem where he refers to a service at Manhood End (Selsey) that was conducted by Wilfrid's chaplain and biographer Stephen of Ripon, referred to as Eddi in the poem:

Eddi's Service (AD 687)
Eddi, priest of St. Wilfrid
In his chapel at Manhood End,
Ordered a midnight service
For such as cared to attend.

But the Saxons were keeping Christmas,
And the night was stormy as well.
Nobody came to service,
Though Eddi rang the bell.

"'Wicked weather for walking,"
Said Eddi of Manhood End.
"But I must go on with the service
For such as care to attend."

The altar-lamps were lighted, –
An old marsh-donkey came,
Bold as a guest invited,
And stared at the guttering flame.

The storm beat on at the windows,
The water splashed on the floor,
And a wet, yoke-weary bullock
Pushed in through the open door.

"How do I know what is greatest,
How do I know what is least?
That is My Father's business,"
Said Eddi, Wilfrid's priest.

"But – three are gathered together –
Listen to me and attend.
I bring good news, my brethren!"
Said Eddi of Manhood End.

And he told the Ox of a Manger
And a Stall in Bethlehem,
And he spoke to the Ass of a Rider,
That rode to Jerusalem.

They steamed and dripped in the chancel,
They listened and never stirred,
While, just as though they were Bishops,
Eddi preached them The World,

Till the gale blew off on the marshes
And the windows showed the day,
And the Ox and the Ass together
Wheeled and clattered away.

And when the Saxons mocked him,
Said Eddi of Manhood End,
"I dare not shut His chapel
On such as care to attend."

— Kipling 1995, p. 179

== See also ==
- History of Sussex
- History of Christianity in Sussex
