= Selsey, East Beach =

Shingle beach in Selsey, West Sussex, England

Coordinates: 50.726°N 0.783°W

- Site of Special Scientific Interest
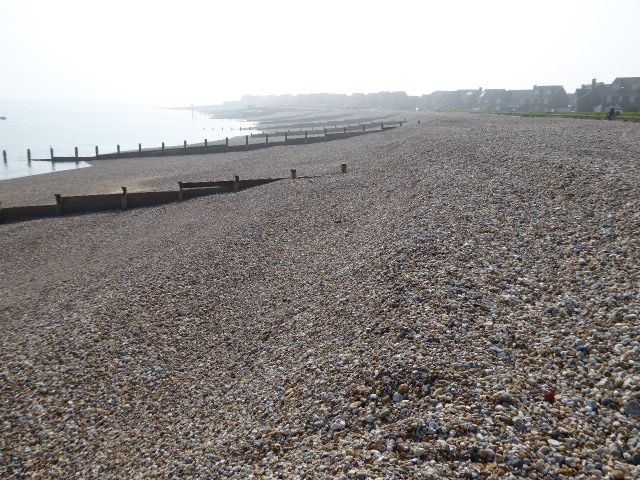
- Location of Selsey, East Beach.
- Area of search: West Sussex
- Grid reference: SZ 860 925
- Interest: Geological
- Area: 1.7 hectares (4.2 acres)
- Notification date: 1988
- Location map: Magic Map

Selsey, East Beach is a 1.7-hectare (4.2-acre) geological Site of Special Scientific Interest in Selsey in West Sussex, United Kingdom. It is a Geological Conservation Review site.

This site exposes a sequence of marine estuary and freshwater deposits dating to the warm Eemian interglacial. The site has fossils of fauna dating to the early Eemian around 130 thousand years ago, such as straight-tusked elephant, an extinct species of rhinoceros, Dicerorhinus hemitoechus, European pond tortoise, beaver and horse.

This short stretch of shingle beach is open to the public but no geology is visible.
