= Selsey =

Seaside town and civil parish in West Sussex, England

Coordinates: 50.73502°N 0.78977°W

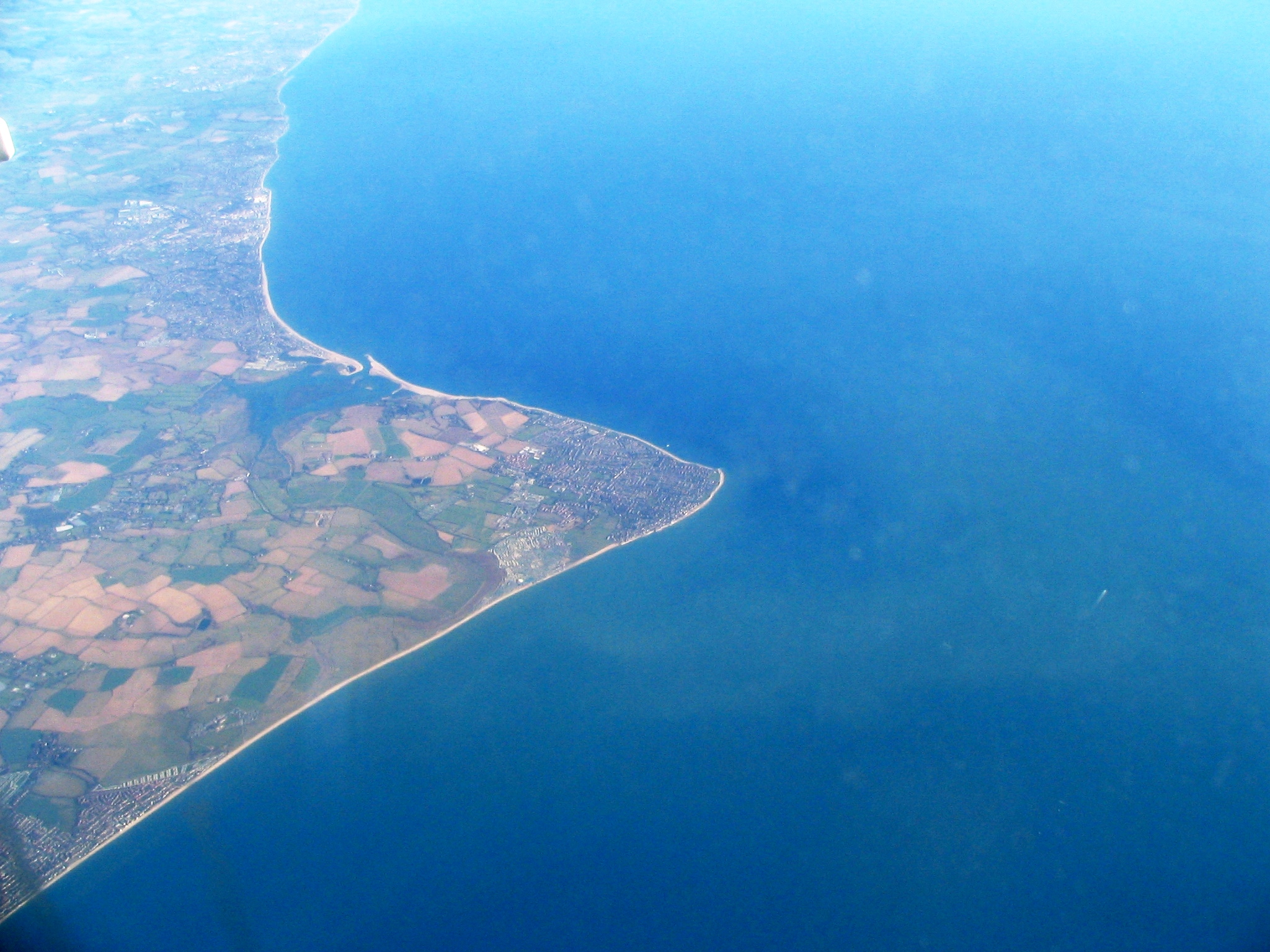
- Aerial view

- Location within West Sussex
- Area: 12.28 km^{2} (4.74 sq mi)
- Population: 10,737 (2011 Census)
  - Density: 804/km^{2} (2,080/sq mi)
- OS grid reference: SZ854935
  - London: 60 miles (97 km) NNE
- Civil parish: Selsey
- District: Chichester
- Shire county: West Sussex
- Region: South East
- Country: England
- Sovereign state: United Kingdom
- Post town: CHICHESTER
- Postcode district: PO20
- Dialling code: 01243
- Police: Sussex
- Fire: West Sussex
- Ambulance: South East Coast
- UK Parliament: Chichester
- Website: http://www.selseytowncouncil.gov.uk/

Selsey (/ˈsɛlzi/) is a seaside town and civil parish, about eight miles (13 km) south of Chichester, West Sussex, England.

Selsey lies at the southernmost point of the Manhood Peninsula, almost cut off from mainland Sussex by the sea. It is in the Chichester district and is bounded to the west by Bracklesham Bay, to the north by Broad Rife, (Note: Rife is the local dialect word for stream or creek) to the east by Pagham Harbour and terminates in the south at Selsey Bill. There are significant rock formations beneath the sea off both of its coasts, named the Owers rocks and Mixon rocks. Coastal erosion has been an ever-present problem for Selsey. In 2011 the parish had a population of 10,737.

The B2145 is the only road in and out of the town crossing a bridge over the water inlet at Pagham Harbour at a point known as "the ferry". At one time Selsey was inaccessible at flood tide, and a boat was stationed at the ferry to take horses and passengers to and from Sidlesham. (Note: A man and horse paid twopence; a foot passenger one halfpenny. The farmers and renters paid annually a certain portion of corn.)

== Place name ==
There are suggestions that the name "Selsey" originally meant "Holy Island" because of its connection with Saint Wilfrid. The Venerable Bede in his writings described the name "Selsey" as "the Isle of Sea Calves" (sea calves are better known as seals) hence "Seal Island".

In 1911 Edward Heron-Allen identified at least 20 different spellings of the place today knows as "Selsey". A selection of versions as identified by Heron-Allen are:

- Seoles – Old English
- Seleisi – Domesday Book, 1086
- Celesye – Assize Rolls, 1279

== History ==
=== Palaeolithic ===
The earliest evidence of human habitation in the Selsey area goes back to the Stone Age. Various stone implements have been found which date to the Palaeolithic period. People have been living in the area ever since.

=== Classical Antiquity ===
Towards the end of the first century B.C. the Atrebates possessed three large urban centres (known as oppida) that served as the tribal mints and possibly the king's court. These were located near modern Silchester, Winchester and the Chichester-Selsey area. So far, in the Chichester-Selsey area, there is no archaeological evidence to confirm this, although various coins from the Atrebates rulers named Commius, Tincommius, Verica, Eppillus, and Cunobelin were found on Selsey beach in 1877, and it is thought that these coins would have been minted locally. The 17th century antiquarian William Camden, and others have posited that the Atrebates settlement was located at the Mixon (Note: "At low water there are obscure remains of that ancient little City where those Bishops resided.") rocks, now south of Selsey Bill. More recent hypotheses have suggested that the Chichester-Selsey oppidum was distributed across the region.

There is evidence of possible Roman activity in Selsey. The archaeologist Barry Cunliffe wrote that in the middle of the first century, the area provided a good base for the transfer of sea-borne goods and the storing and distributing of supplies to support their conquest of south west Britain. When this objective had been achieved the Romans moved their base to Chichester. The Mixon would have been part of the mainland, at the time of the Roman occupation and it is evident that they used its stone for building material.

=== Early Middle Ages ===
Some Anglo-Saxon gold fragments were found on the beach between Selsey and Bognor, these were dated as late 6th/ 8th century and what made them particularly interesting is that they had a runic inscription on them. The fragments were handed over to the British Museum.

The Anglo Saxon Chronicle records the legendary foundation of Sussex by Ælle and his sons when they landed near Selsey.

Stephen of Ripon and the Venerable Bede say that Wilfrid arrived in Selsey [about 680] and converted the Kingdom of the South Saxons to Christianity. (Note: Some historians have posited that the conversion of Selsey, to Christianity, would have predated Wilfrid, suggesting that the population would be practising insular Christianity. Wilfrid and Bede were not supporters of the Celtic church hence the partisan narrative.) Selsey Abbey stood at Selsey (probably where Church Norton is today), and was the cathedra for the Sussex Diocese until the Council of London ordered the removal of the See to Chichester in 1075, during the reign of William the Conqueror. In all there had been twenty-two Bishops of Selsey over a period of 370 years.

=== High and Late Middle Ages ===
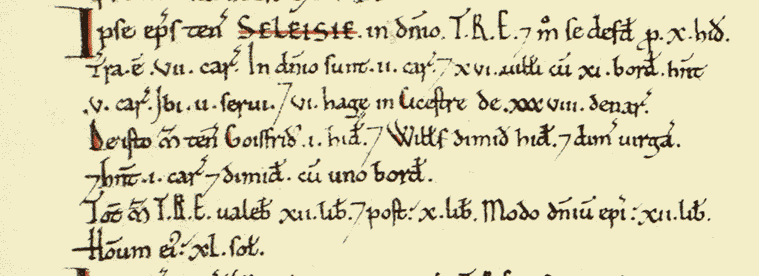
Entry for Selsey in the Domesday Book

In the Domesday Book Selesie is mentioned under the hundred of Somerley:

The Bishop(of Chichester) holds Selesie in domain. (Note: That is to say that the Bishop of Selsey(or Chichester) holds Selsey in his own hands, or as his own domain. He holds some of his lands in "demesne" for his own use, and lets out parts of it to tenants.) In the time of King Edward it was rated at ten hides, and so it continues. The arable is seven plough lands. There are two ploughs in the demesne, and fourteen villains with eleven bondsmen have five ploughs.

— Horsfield 1835, p. 35

=== Early modern ===
The manor of Selsey remained in the Bishop of Chichester's hands until 1561, when it was taken over by the crown.

In July 1588 the Spanish Armada arrived off the Isle of Wight with the intention of attacking Portsmouth. The wind changed direction to the south-west. Men from the Manhood Peninsula serving under Francis Drake conceived a plan to lure the Spanish fleet onto the Owers rocks (off Selsey). However the Spanish Admiral, recognising the danger, decided to head for Calais.

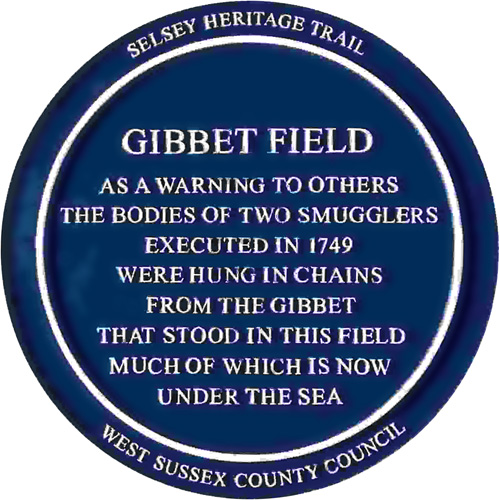
Blue plaque commemorating the hanging of two smugglers in Gibbet Field Selsey in 1749

In 1647, a fatality was recorded following a cricket match at Selsey when a fielder called Henry Brand was hit on the head by the batsman Thomas Latter, who was trying to hit the ball a second time. The incident repeated one at Horsted Keynes in 1624.

Over the centuries Selsey has derived an income from the sea, not all of it strictly legal. In the eighteenth century Selsey Bill was very much more isolated than it is today, and the sand spit extended farther out to sea. There was only the causeway connected to the mainland and that was covered at high tide. The approach of the local riding officer would have been conspicuous in the extreme. One of the enterprises was smuggling with many local people being involved in the lucrative trade. The Rectors of Selsey reputedly claimed a tithe on all kegs landed there, and stories also tell of a passageway leading from the Old Rectory (at Church Norton) to the remains of a Mound, thought to have been built by the Normans. The course of the tunnel was marked by a depression on the surface of the ground as late as 1911.

The legal export of wool trade had been established for centuries with Chichester being granted staple port status. However, the Selsey area was notorious for the illegal export of wool, in a custom known as owling. During the 1720s one Selsey man ran a regular ferry service to France, travelling back and forth every five weeks, and other prominent Selsey figures made considerable fortunes just from part-time work in the free-trade.

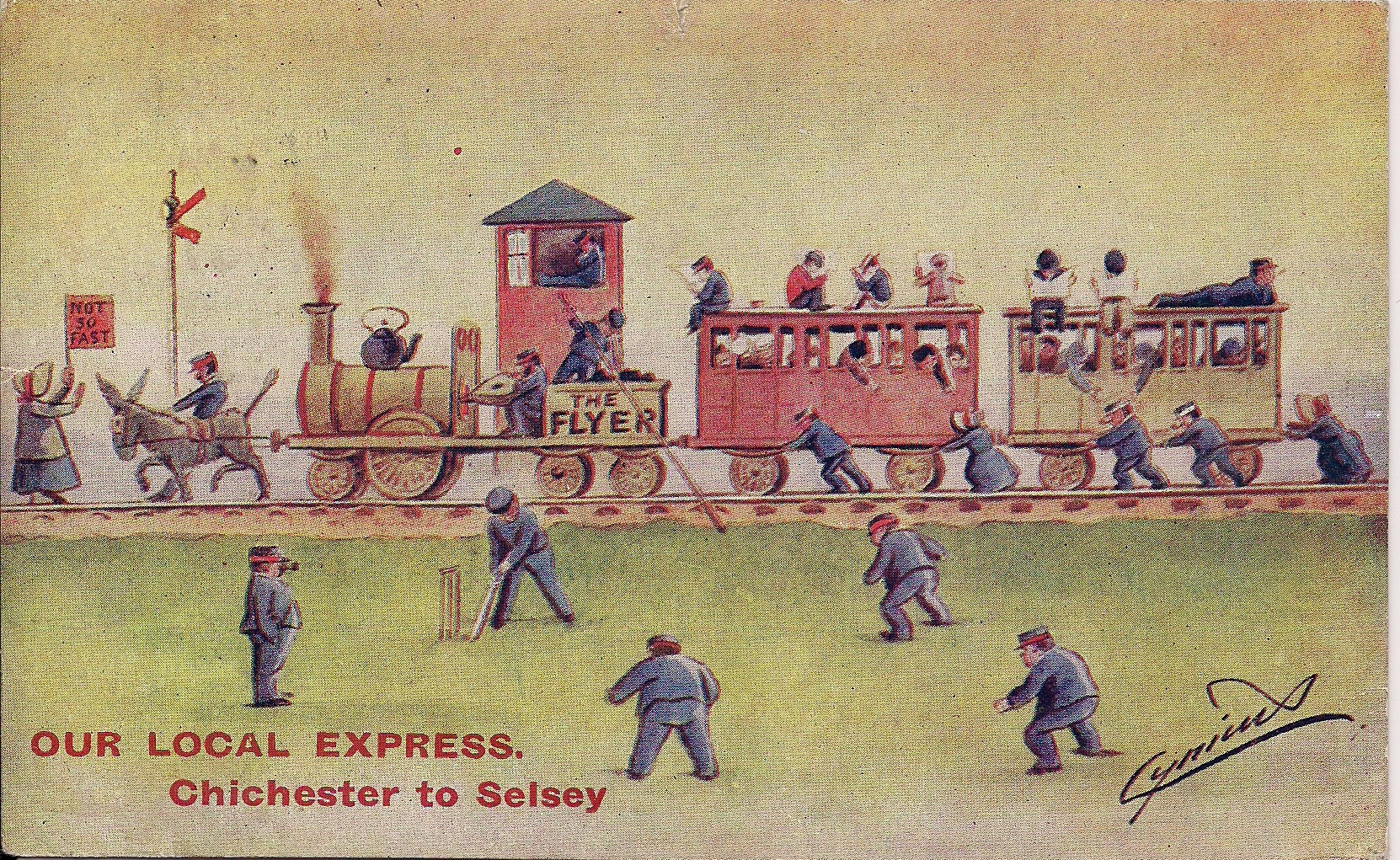
Selsey Tramway Satirical Postcard circa 1907

In 1749 fourteen smugglers, members of the notorious Hawkhurst Gang, were accused of the murder of William Galley, a custom-house officer, and Daniel Chater, a shoemaker. A contemporary book written under the pseudonym "A. Gentleman" provides a narrative on the offence, capture, trial and execution of the smugglers involved. Seven were tried and condemned to death at Chichester assizes; one died in gaol before sentence could be carried out and the other six were hanged at the Broyle north of Chichester. Subsequently, the bodies of two of the smugglers, John Cobby and John Hammond, were hung in gibbets at Selsey Bill so that they could be seen at great distance from east and west.

=== Modern ===
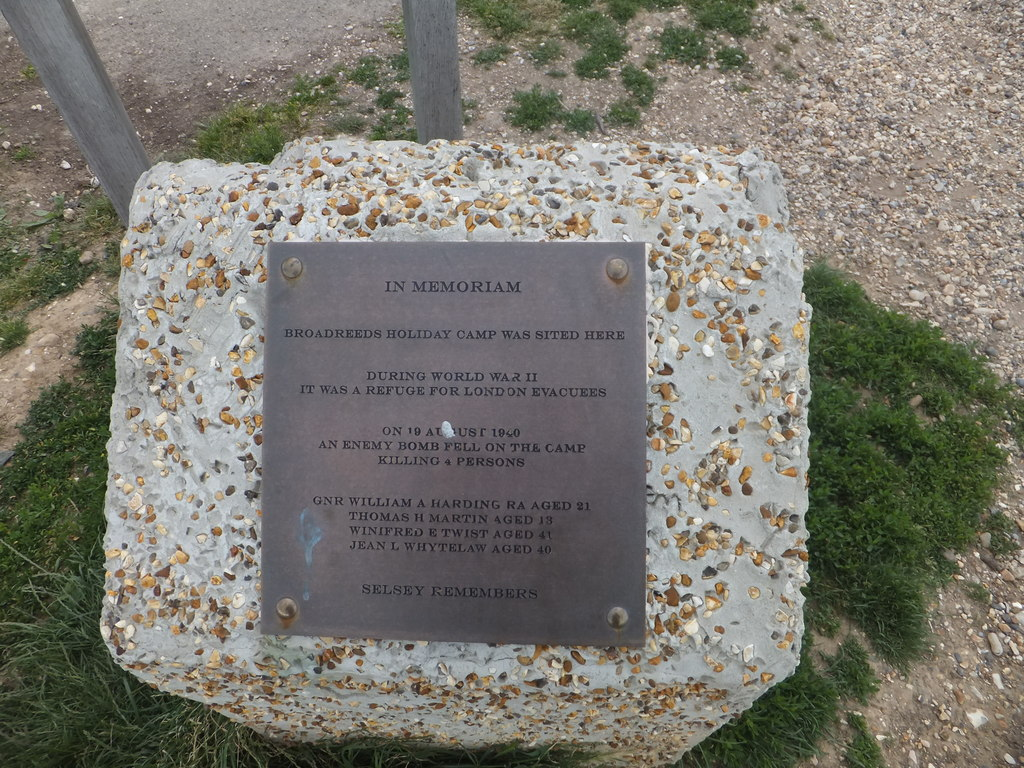
Memorial tablet commemorating wartime bombing deaths, at Broadreeds camp

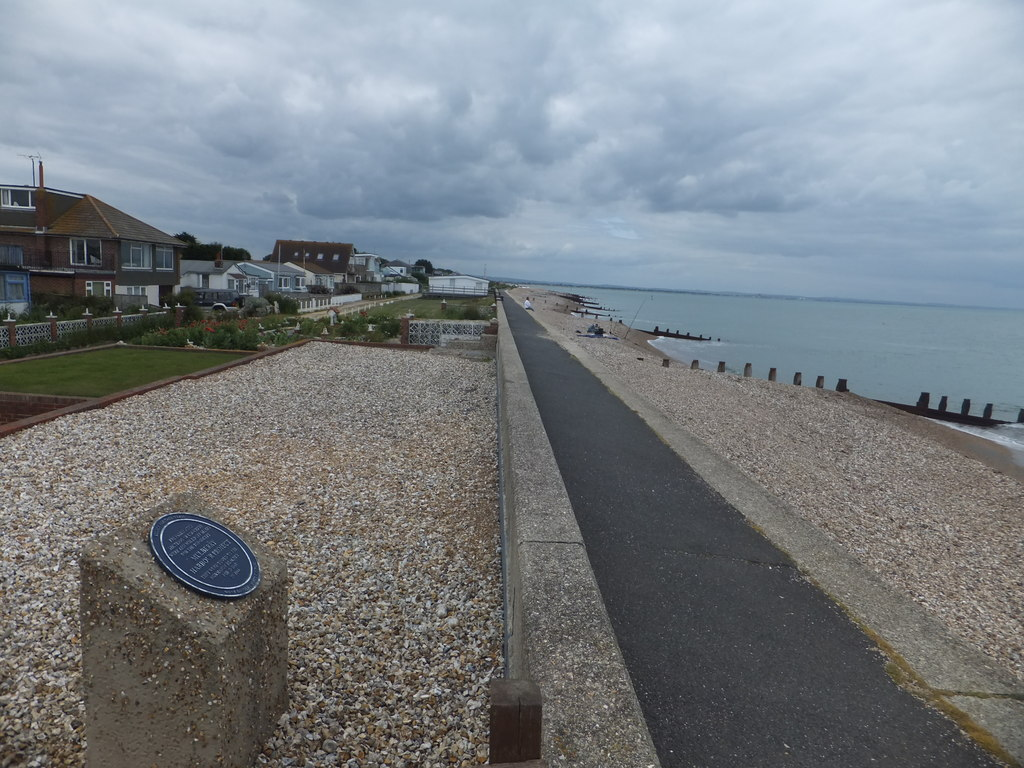
Sea wall at East Beach, with plaque in the foreground, commemorating construction of Mulberry harbours in the area

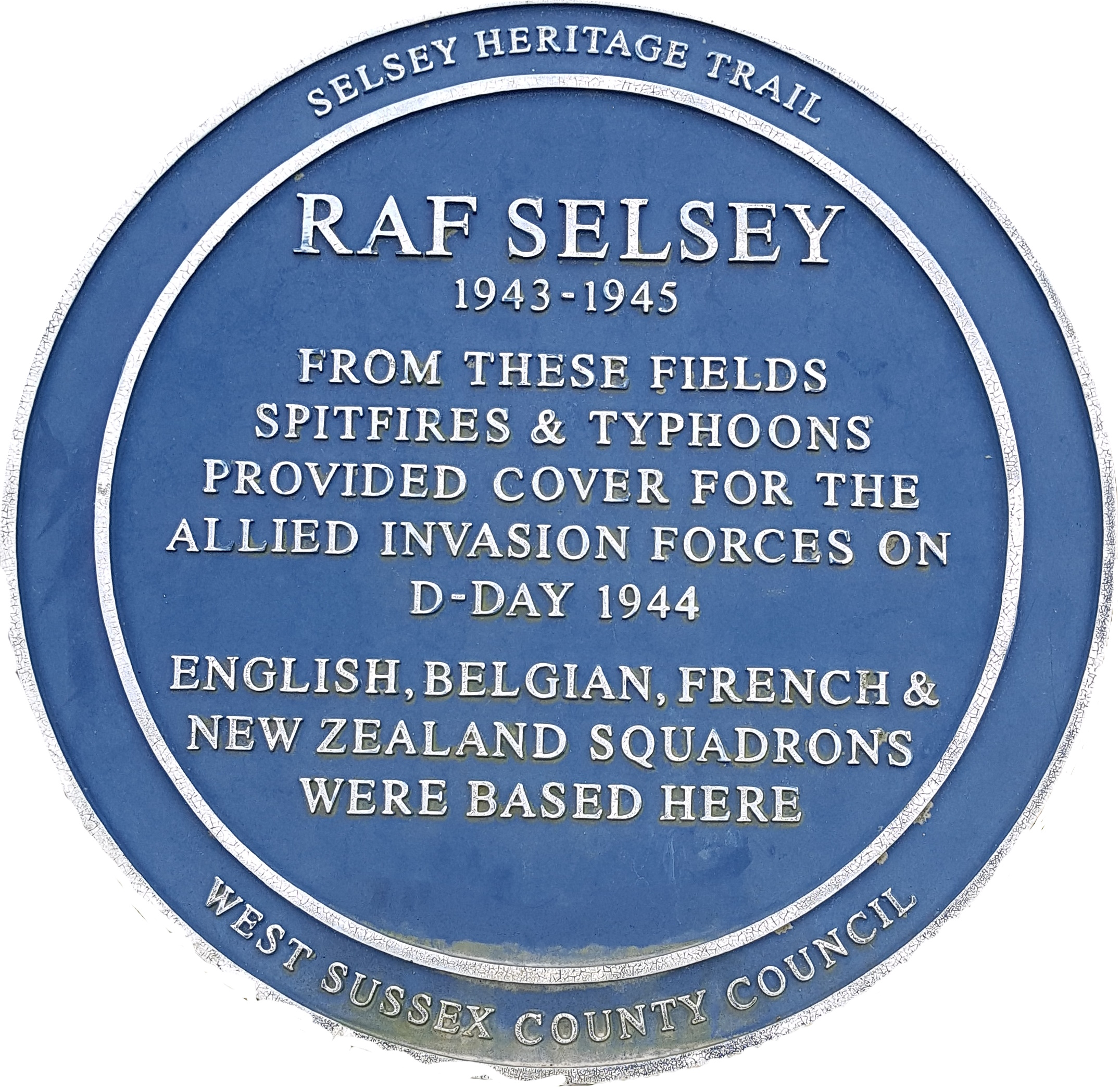
Blue plaque marking the location of RAF Selsey

At the beginning of the 19th century, Selsey opened its first school. In 1818 premises were granted to the Rector and churchwardens of Selsey which were "on trust to permit the premises to be used for a schoolhouse or free school, for the gratuitous education of such poor children belonging to the Parish of Selsey as the said trustees or successors may think proper."The school was eventually taken over by the local authority in 1937.

Selsey was connected to Chichester from 1897 to 1935 by a rail link initially called the Hundred of Manhood and Selsey Tramway and later the West Sussex Railway. The light railway rolling stock was all second hand and not very reliable and the journey times lengthy. Various nicknames such as the "Selsey Snail" were attributed to the tram and comic postcards were issued reflecting its poor service.

In the late 1930s the Broadreeds Holiday camp, that was later to be run by Pontins, was used as a transit camp for girls coming on the Kindertransport. The woman appointed as second in command, Sophie Friedlaender describes in her memoir how she first arrived at the camp:

On a crisp January morning in the New Year, I headed to Paddington station, where I soon recognised the other helpers. There was a doctor from Berlin, a bilingual secretary from London, a perfume manufacturer from Vienna, a young German couple on their way to Australia, two young English girls who had worked in Jewish clubs. The train went to Selsey Bill, (Note: The train probably terminated at Chichester as the train line between Chichester and Selsey had closed in 1935. Sophie did not leave Germany till 1938.) a dreary coastal landscape in winter. We ended up in a holiday camp that was empty in winter.

— Friedlaender 1996, p. 56

By the time of World War II the Kindertransport had stopped; Broadreeds camp then continued to accept evacuees mainly from London. This was until August 1940 when during a bombing raid, three evacuees and one soldier were killed. All the evacuees were re-evacuated shortly after. Also, during World War II, large areas of the village were closed to the public, particularly as off shore at East Beach, there was secret(at the time) work on the Mulberry harbours. These were eventually towed to Normandy for D-Day.

A private aerodrome, situated at Church Norton, was requisitioned by the RAF in 1942, then in 1943 after some construction work, became an advanced landing ground (ALG) known as RAF Selsey. The airfield 98 miles (158 km) from Normandy, was built to support D-Day. It was decommissioned as an ALG shortly after D-Day, it then became a satellite of RAF Tangmere for a while and finally a reserve airfield for the remainder of the war. (Note: The airfield was built to support D-day its squadrons were equipped with Spitfires and Typhoons.)

Erosion by the sea and flooding has been a constant problem for Selsey. In the 1950s there was major work, to improve the sea walls and groynes, to protect against the winter storms. By the end of the 1980s, with the constant battering from the sea, a lot of the defences needed remedial work. In 2011 the Environment Agency started to build new sea defences between Selsey and Bracklesham, the scheme was described as managed realignment in that it involved the building of new defences inland from the coast and allowing a new "intertidal area" to form seaward of the new defences. "Intertidal" means the land that is exposed at low tide and covered by the sea at high tide. Then in 2013 the 300 hectares (740 acres)scheme was completed. The Environment Agency says that "it will improve the standard of flood protection for over 300 homes, the water treatment works and the main road into Selsey. It will also create important new intertidal wildlife habitat and open up new footpaths, cycleways and bridleways."

== Selsey today ==
=== Commerce ===
Selsey has a high street with a mix of shops and restaurants. There is also a parade of shops at East Beach. The town has many holiday cottages, bed and breakfasts as well as some very large static caravan parks that make Selsey a popular holiday destination. It also has a selection of light industries and a small fishing fleet.

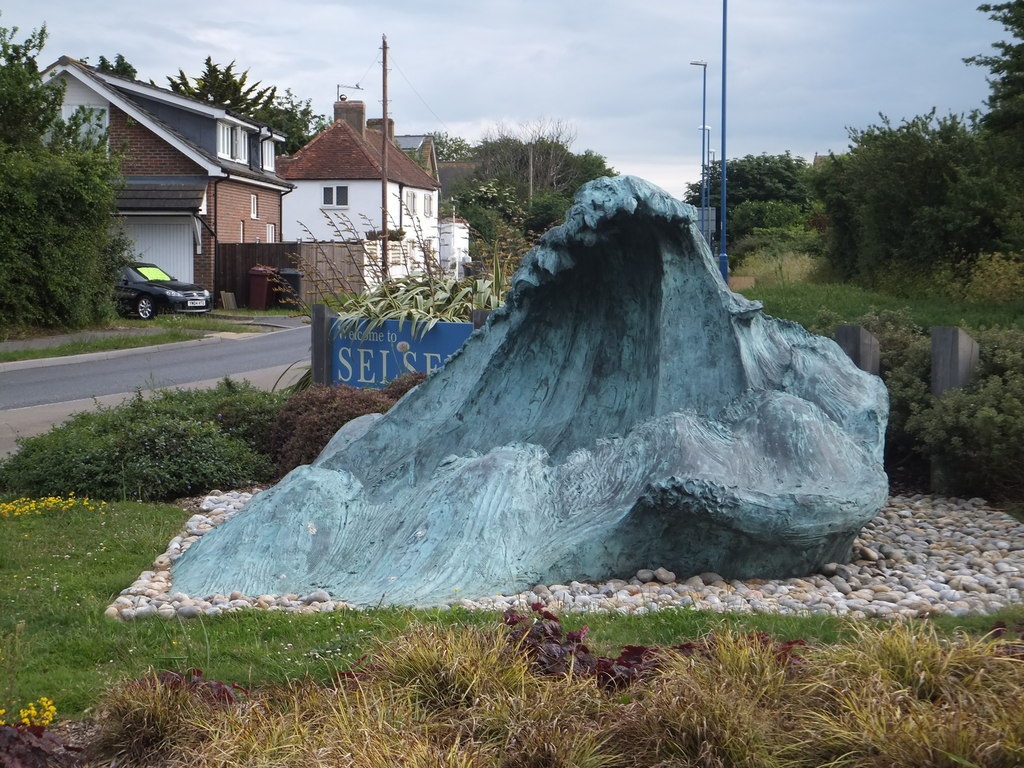
The Kanagawa sculpture at the entrance to Selsey

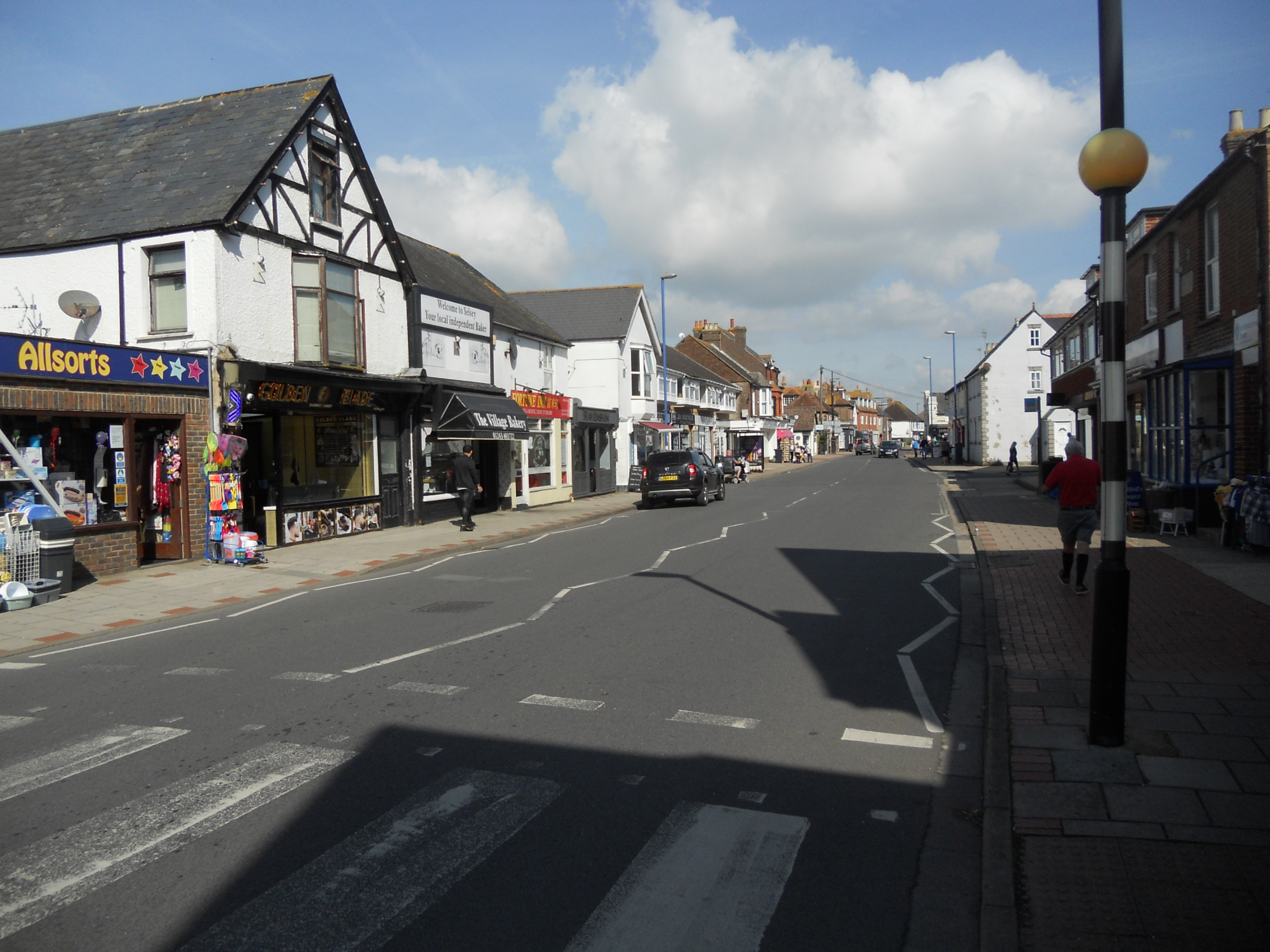
Selsey High Street

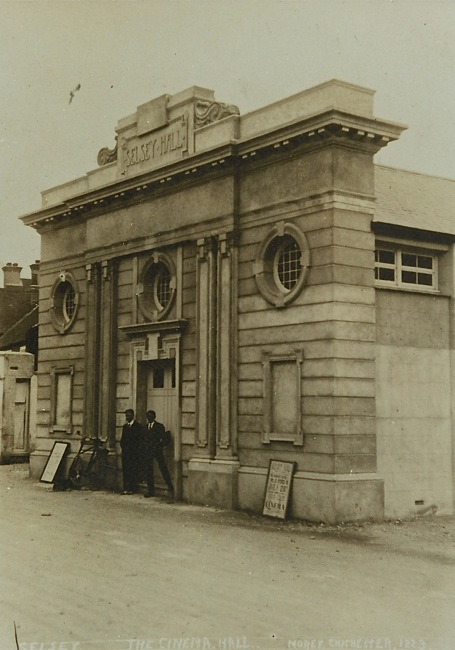
The Selsey Pavilion

Pictures from Selsey

=== Sport and leisure ===
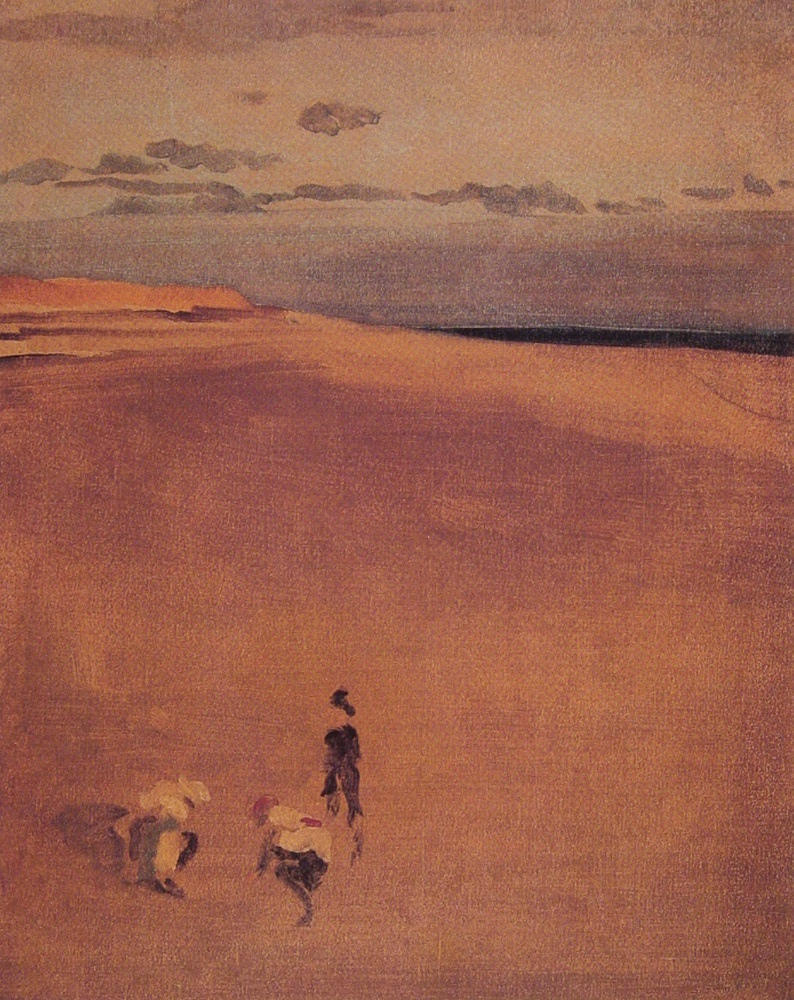
The Beach at Selsey Bill, James McNeill Whistler (1865)

==== Football ====
Selsey Football Club was formed in 1903 and moved to the High Street Ground in the late 1940s. The current Selsey F.C. is a semi-professional association football club and has been awarded Chartered Standard Community status. It is affiliated to the Sussex County Football Association.

==== Selsey Cricket Club ====
It is known that cricket has been played, in Selsey at least since 1647, although the earliest record for the Selsey Cricket Club was on 9 July 1834 when the team played Kingley Vale. Selsey won by 3 runs.

A former president was Hubert Doggart, OBE, MA. He was the son of the sportsman Graham Doggart who rose to chair the Football Association. Doggart represented England in two Test matches in 1950. He was President of the M.C.C. (1981–1982), the Cricket Council (1981–1982) and the Cricket Society (1983–1998), and he chaired the Friends of Arundel Castle Cricket Club (1993–2003). In the 1970s he played occasionally for Selsey C.C.

Selsey are a Clubmark Club running two men's League sides, one Ladies League side, several Junior sides and Sunday and Midweek Friendly sides.

==== Selsey Arts ====
The wide landscapes, exposed coastal location and diverse birdlife lure artists to Selsey, many of whom belong to Arts Dream Selsey Artists. The society holds regular exhibitions and events.

The list of artists, who have featured Selsey in their work, include Whistler and J. M. W. Turner.

==== Holiday Park ====
On the west side of the town is the Seal Bay holiday park. The Seal bay park was purchased by Haven in 2026.

== Education ==
Selsey has a secondary school called the Selsey Academy (formerly known as Manhood Community College up till September 2011) and two primary schools, Seal Primary School (now known as Seal Academy) and Medmerry Primary School. Before and after the Second World War there were several private preparatory schools in Selsey including Broombank School housed in the former residence of the music hall entertainer Bransby Williams next to the Selsey Hotel. (Note: Kelly's 1938 directory entry for Broombank Boarding; School(Misses Morgan, principals), Manor road., and entry for the Selsey Hotel: Selsey Hotel (Selsey Hotel Ltd.), Manor Rd.) The owner/headmaster from the early 1950s until the school's closure in 1969 was William Percy Higgs (died Bristol 1986), a former Cambridge University organ scholar and music master at Eton. Higgs made Broombank a music and arts school attracting the children of well known actors, artists and musicians as well as temporary pupils from France, whose numbers occasionally matched those of the British children.

== RNLI Selsey Lifeboat ==
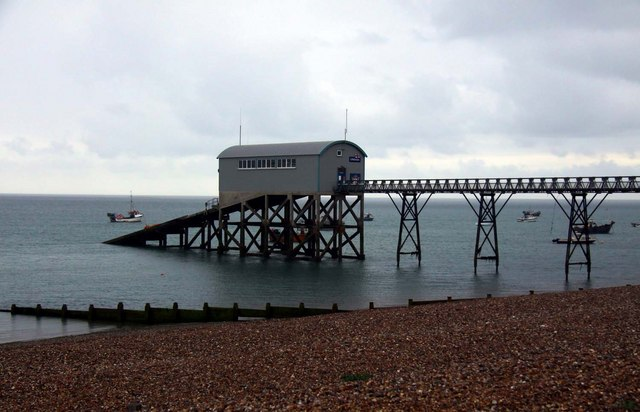
The old Selsey RNLI Lifeboat house

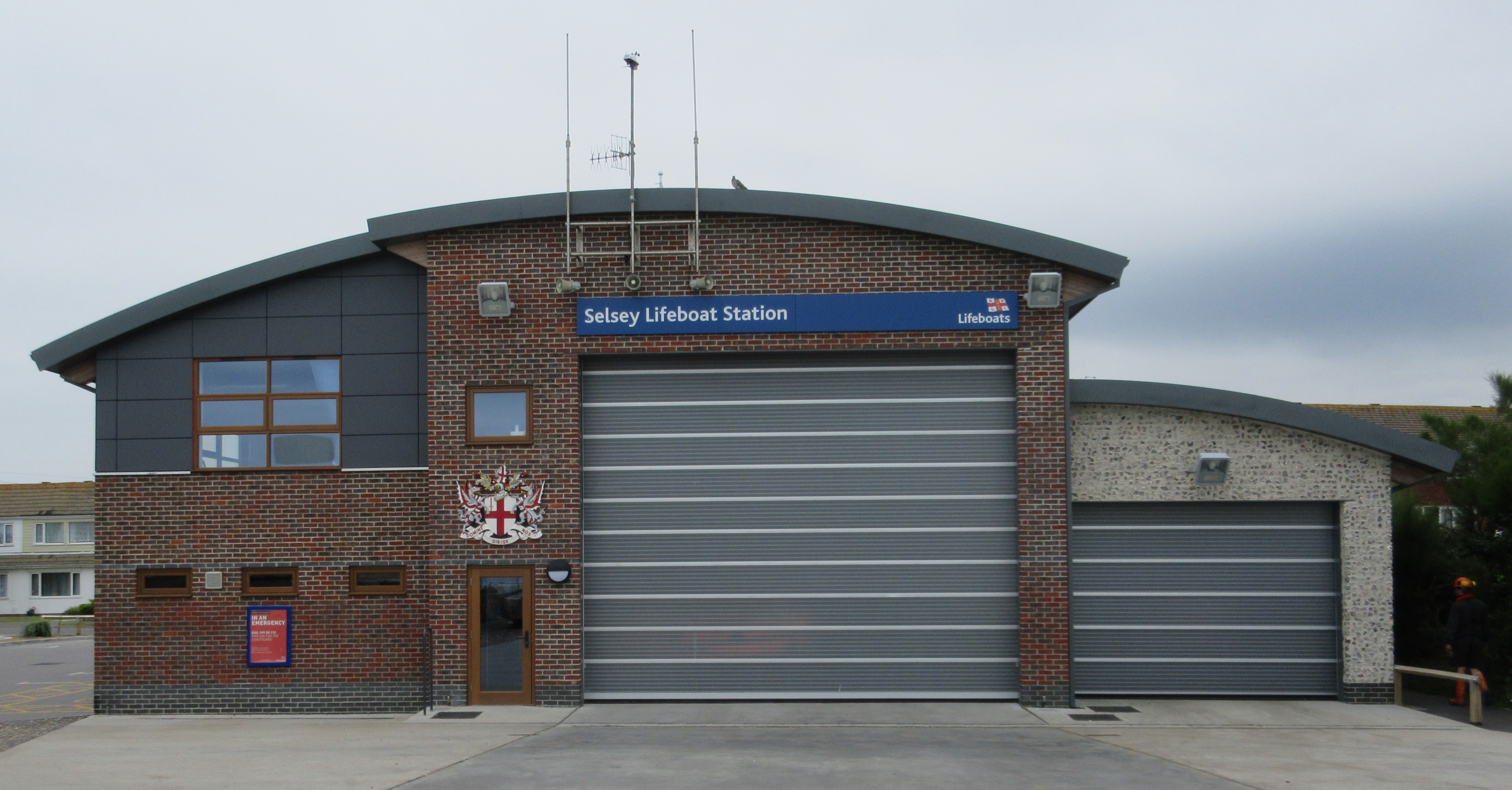
The current Selsey RNLI Lifeboat station

Selsey had an RNLI lifeboat station and shop on Kingsway, east of Selsey Bill. The station was established in 1861. In 2014 Selsey had a Tyne-class lifeboat and a D Class Inshore Lifeboat which had its own boat house just off the beach. In 2011 Selsey Lifeboat Station celebrated 150 years during which period lifeboat crew have received 10 awards for gallantry.

A new boathouse, to replace the old off shore boathouse, was constructed on shore. The final launch from the old boathouse was made on 1 April 2017 and the old boathouse itself was demolished during the Summer of 2017. The new boathouse accommodates both the inshore lifeboat and the new Shannon-class lifeboat, which has been allocated to Selsey, to replace the Tyne class. The RNLI shop has also been transferred to the new building.

== Landmarks ==
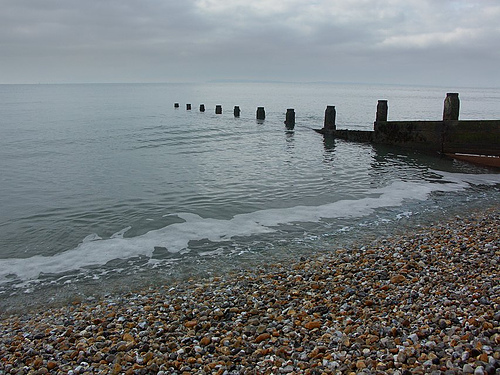
Bracklesham Bay

The parish has a couple of Sites of Special Scientific Interest these are Bracklesham Bay that runs along the coastline of the parish and a 1.7-hectare (4.2-acre) geological site at East Beach.

Medmerry Mill is a grade II listed tower windmill restored in the 1960s and currently in use as a gift shop.

St Peter's Church, a grade II listed building, is the parish church and dates from the 13th century. The church building was originally situated at the location of St Wilfrid's first monastery and cathedral at Church Norton some 2 miles (3.2 km) north of the present centre of population. It was moved from there in the 19th century and is now situated at the entrance to Selsey High Street. When the removed church was re-consecrated in April 1866, due to an oversight it was not consecrated properly to carry out marriages. The omission was not discovered until 1904, by which time 196 marriage services had taken place. These services although canonically correct were not strictly legal. To rectify the situation an Act of Parliament was required. (Note: Provisional Order (Marriages) Act 1905 (5 Edward VII., c.23)) In 1906 an order (Note: Provisional Order (Marriages) Confirmation Act 1906 (6 Edward VII., c.26)) was made to finally validate all the marriages celebrated between 12 April 1866 and 25 February 1904.

== Notable residents ==
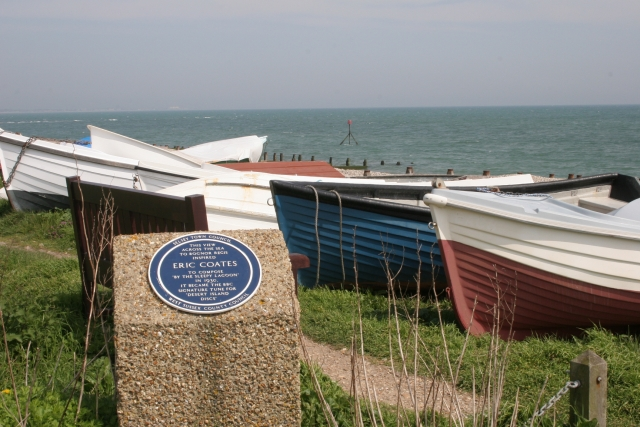
The plaque notes that Eric Coates was inspired to write By the Sleepy Lagoon, the signature tune for Desert Island Discs, whilst watching the sea from here (read plaque.)

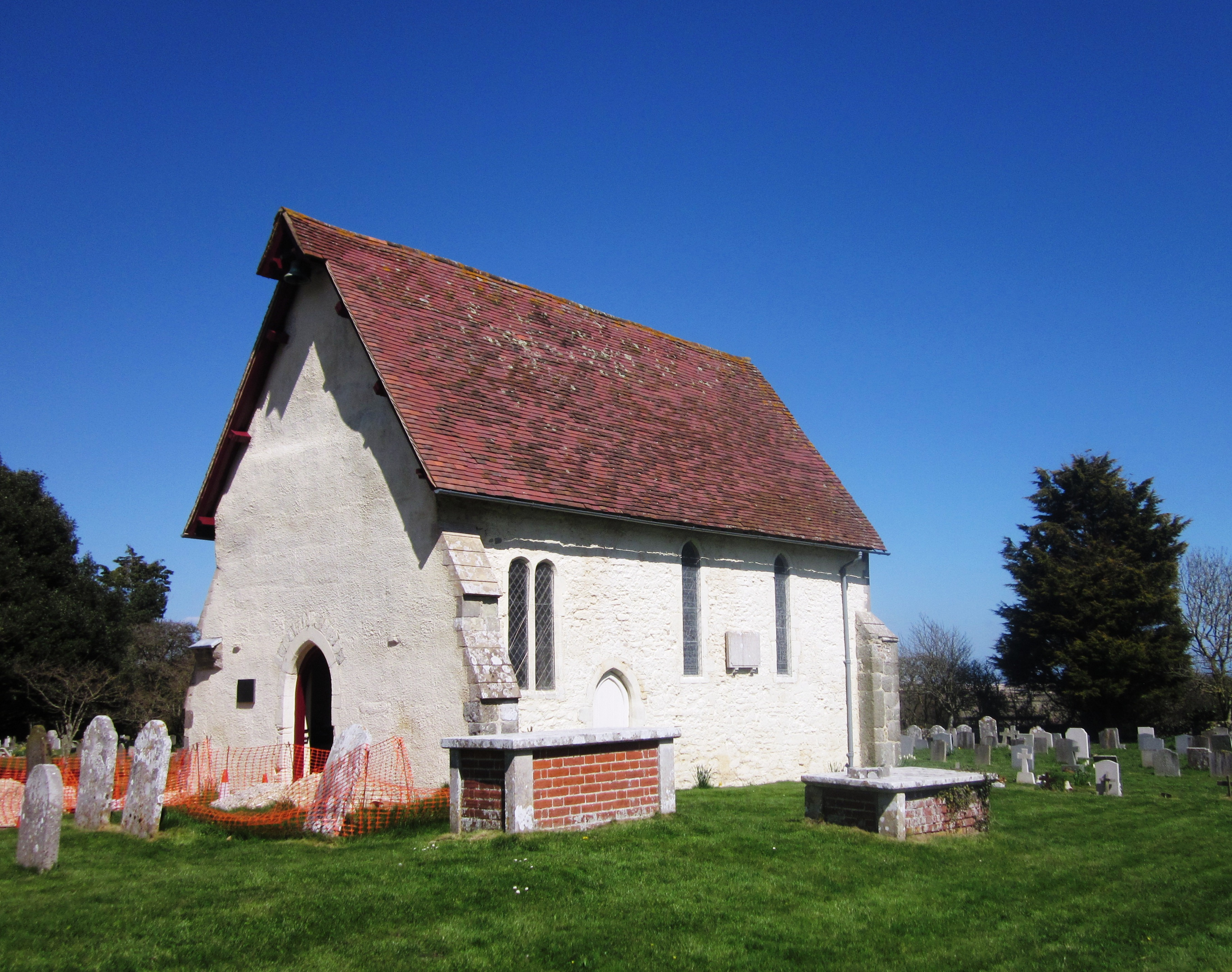
St Wilfrid's Chapel Church Norton

- Eric Coates (1886–1957) – The composer lived and worked in Selsey. He was inspired to write By the Sleepy Lagoon after overlooking the sea towards Bognor Regis. His musical composition can be heard as the theme tune to Desert Island Discs on BBC Radio 4.
- Air Commodore Edward 'Teddy' Mortlock Donaldson (1912–1992) who set a new world air speed record of 616 mph in September 1946, in the Star Meteor IV. Donaldson lived at Iron Latch Cottage and there is a blue plaque on the beach at the bottom of Park Lane to mark the event. Donaldson has a second plaque at No. 86, Grafton Road.
- Edward Heron-Allen (1861–1943): Selsey's most distinguished resident in the early 20th century, Mr Heron-Allen made an enormous contribution to village life and today is still well known as the author of the classic work on local history for the area.
- David Hewlett, (1968– ) British-born Canadian actor, writer, director and voice actor best known for his role as Dr. Rodney McKay on Stargate SG-1, Stargate Atlantis and Stargate Universe resided here for some time before he and his family later emigrated to Canada.
- Sir Patrick Moore (1923–2012) – astronomer, writer, researcher, radio commentator and television presenter, lived in Selsey from 1968 until his death. He was an active member of the local Selsey Cricket Club and was made an Honorary Life Vice President.
- R. C. Sherriff (1896–1975) – The writer R.C. Sherriff, whose best known play was Journey's End, had a holiday home in Selsey. According to Sherriff's own account, he began writing Journey's End "in one of the railway carriage bungalows on Selsey Bill". During the 1930s, the Pavilion Theatre, in the High Street, witnessed several stagings of Journey's End. Sherriff attended a rehearsal and advised the cast before his departure to Hollywood. (Note: Sherriff's diary notes that he met with Mr Vince and Colonel Moore (two members of the cast) at his own house in Selsey - Cymba – on 14 May 1933 of that year, and that he was present at a rehearsal on 9 November, the dress rehearsal on 27 November and the performances on 27 and 28 November 1933.)When his mother died in 1965, her ashes were interred in the wall of St Wilfrid's Chapel, in Church Norton. And when Sherriff himself died in November 1975, his ashes were laid along with hers.

== Cultural references ==
Selsey Bill is referenced in the song "Saturday's Kids" by The Jam (from the 1979 album Setting Sons), along with Bracklesham Bay, as a place where these working-class children take holiday with their families; "Save up their money for a holiday/To Selsey Bill, or Bracklesham Bay."

Selsey is also mentioned in Ben Jonson's play Volpone in Act 2 Scene 1 with reference to 'Selsey cockles' (Note: SIR POLITIQUE WOULD_BEE: "In oranges, musk-melons, and such like: sometimes in Colchester-oysters, and your Selsey-cockles.')

In the opening scene of the Lerner and Loewe 1956 musical My Fair Lady, Professor Higgins correctly identifies one of the characters as coming from Selsey. (Note: THE SELSEY MAN: "He ain't a tec. He's a gentleman, look at his shoes." HIGGINS: (Turning on him genially) "And how are your people down at Selsey?" THE SELSEY MAN: (Suspiciously) "Who told you my people come from Selsey?...".)

Selsey is further referenced in the Madness song "Driving in My Car": "I drive up to Muswell Hill, I've even been to Selsey Bill".

== Climate ==
Selsey's climate is classified as warm and temperate. Although Selsey is in one of the sunnier areas of the UK, there is rainfall throughout the year and even the driest month still has rain.Probably the most problematic climatic hazard is wind. The town is situated in an area where tornadoes and waterspouts are common. A tornado in 1986 damaged 200 houses and cut a swathe 70 metres wide. Another tornado in 1998 left an estimated £10m of destruction and damaged the late Patrick Moore's observatory.

A study published by Princeton University and McGill University, in 2020, concluded that the Manhood Peninsula is at particularly high risk of flooding as its topography is less than 5 metres (16 ft) above the current mean sea level and that by 2100 Selsey will be subject to permanent inundation.

To mitigate flood risk, Chichester District Council has adopted the "Pagham to East Head Coastal Defence Strategy (2009)". This strategy describes a "Hold the line" policy for Selsey that will keep the coastline in the same place by maintaining sea defences. However, the Strategy cautions what it calls "funding challenges" that could impact the work needed.

== Nature ==
In 2015, around 50 smooth-hound sharks were observed near the beach at Selsey.

The Pagham Harbour Nature Reserve, operated by the Royal Society for the Protection of Birds (RSPB), is close to Selsey. It is possible to see a variety of bird species including Dark-bellied Brent Geese, Wigeon, Black-headed Gulls, Common, Sandwich and Little Terns.

== Transport ==
=== Roads ===
The B2145 Chichester road, is the only road in and out of the town crossing a bridge over the water inlet at Pagham Harbour at a point known as "the ferry".

=== Buses ===
The Stagecoach South 51 bus route runs from Chichester bus station to Selsey. Buses alternate between terminating at West Sands Caravan Park and Seal Road. The Selsey Community Shuttle Bus, operated by Selsey Town council, covers the outlying areas of the town, bringing people into the centre of Selsey to shop, attend the doctors' or dentists' surgeries, or to catch the Stagecoach bus into Chichester.

=== Selsey Venture Club ===
The Selsey Venture Club operate a voluntary minibus transport for elderly/ infirm residents to encourage them to take part in local community activities.

=== Airports and railway stations ===
The nearest airport is at Southampton followed by those at Gatwick, Bournemouth and Heathrow.

Selsey is no longer connected to the national railway system. The railway line between Chichester and Selsey closed in 1935. The nearest rail stations are Chichester and Bognor.

== See also ==
- Baron Selsey
- Bishops of Selsey
- Selsey (electoral division)
- Selsey South (UK electoral ward)
- Selsey North (UK electoral ward)
