= Lambert Barnard =

English painter

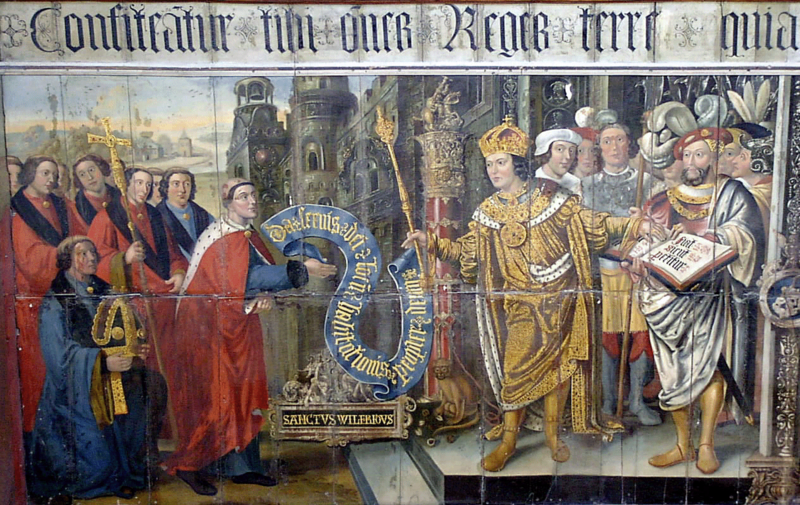
- Painting by Lambert Barnard for Chichester Cathedral; depicts the event in 686 when King Cædwalla issued a charter confirming the rights and territories previously given to Wilfrid by King Aethelwealh and the estate of the Hundred of Pagham. Note: the man in white looking over the left shoulder of the king is believed to be a self-portrait of Barnard
- Born: c.1485
- Died: 1567
- Other name: Lambert Bernardi
- Known for: painting
- Notable work: The Nine Ladies Worthy, The Amberley Panels, The Chichester Cathedral Charter Paintings

Lambert Barnard, also known as Lambert Bernardi (c.1485–1567), was an English Renaissance painter.

== Origins and style ==
Barnard's place of birth is unknown. (Note: Mark Antony Lower suggested that Lambert's father was Theodore Barnardi a Flemish artist of Italian descent, who came to England with his two sons to paint the panels at Chichester cathedral.) All of his extant works can be found in and around Chichester. His son, Anthony Barnard (1514–1619), and grandson, Lambert, and two descendant generations of painters (both also named Lambert) followed his path and remained in the city.

Barnard worked in dry fresco and with oil on board. His style is characterized by the use of rich colours, heavy black outline, and lavish gilding. His work often suffered from heavy over-painting that obscured the delicacy of his hand, but it is still possible to see his knowledge of contemporary European practice. This hints that he might have served an apprenticeship with a Franco/Flemish workshop before c.1513, entering into the service of Robert Sherborn, Bishop of Chichester from 1508 to 1536. Barnard maintained a small workshop with an apprentice boy, John Foster, and his son, Anthony Barnard, who may also have worked alongside his father in the cathedral on his last commission. Records indicate that in 1533, at Bishop Sherborne's request, the Dean and Chapter of Chichester Cathedral granted Barnard an annual payment in recognition of "his long and good service." Following the bishop's death in 1536, Barnard remained in his tenement in East Street, Chichester, living on his annuity, occasionally updating his work on the portraits of kings and bishops, and making repairs to other works in the cathedral.

== Works ==
Over the next twenty years in collaboration with the bishop, Barnard executed several works: the foliage and heraldry-themed vaults of Chichester Cathedral (from c.1513); a domestic wall painting in the Vicar's Close in Chichester; a series of "The Nine Ladies Worthy", or "Heroines of Antiquity" referred to as "The Amberley Panels" (c.1526) for one of the bishop's residences, Amberley Castle; (Note: During Lambert Barnard's time Amberley Castle was the Bishop of Chichester's Summer Palace.) the Italianate heraldic ceiling of the Tudor Room of the Bishop's Palace in Chichester (c.1524–1528) and his most important work, " Chichester Cathedral Charter History Paintings" (1533). This latter is a large scheme originally displayed in the south transept of Chichester Cathedral and depicts its early foundation at Selsey with the West Saxon King Caedwalla (Note: The West Saxon Cædwalla conquered the South Saxons in AD 686.) granting the See of Selsey to St Wilfrid and secondly, its continuation at Chichester showing Henry VIII Confirming to Bishop Sherborn the Royal Protection of Chichester Cathedral. These two conjoined panels are framed above an attached series of roundels of portrait heads of the early kings and queens of England and hang in the south transept. Following the collapse of the cathedral spire in 1861 the rest of the scheme, a 'Catalogus', painted roundels of the Bishops of Selsey and Chichester, was moved to the north transept. In its entirety it also offers a commentary on the historic authority of the Roman Catholic Church in England and the political events leading up to the changes of the Reformation. The recent dating of this scheme in 1533 makes it an original statement hugely important to the history of English art.

== Other works ==
Barnard appears to have spent his working life within Chichester and its immediate area. However, around 1532, he was employed by Sherborn's colleague and executor Thomas West, 9th Baron De La Warr, to decorate the vaults of nearby Boxgrove Priory with West's family heraldry; he may also have been the "Mr. Barnard" responsible for supplying a now lost altarpiece of the Conception for the high altar of St Margaret's Church, Westminster in 1545.

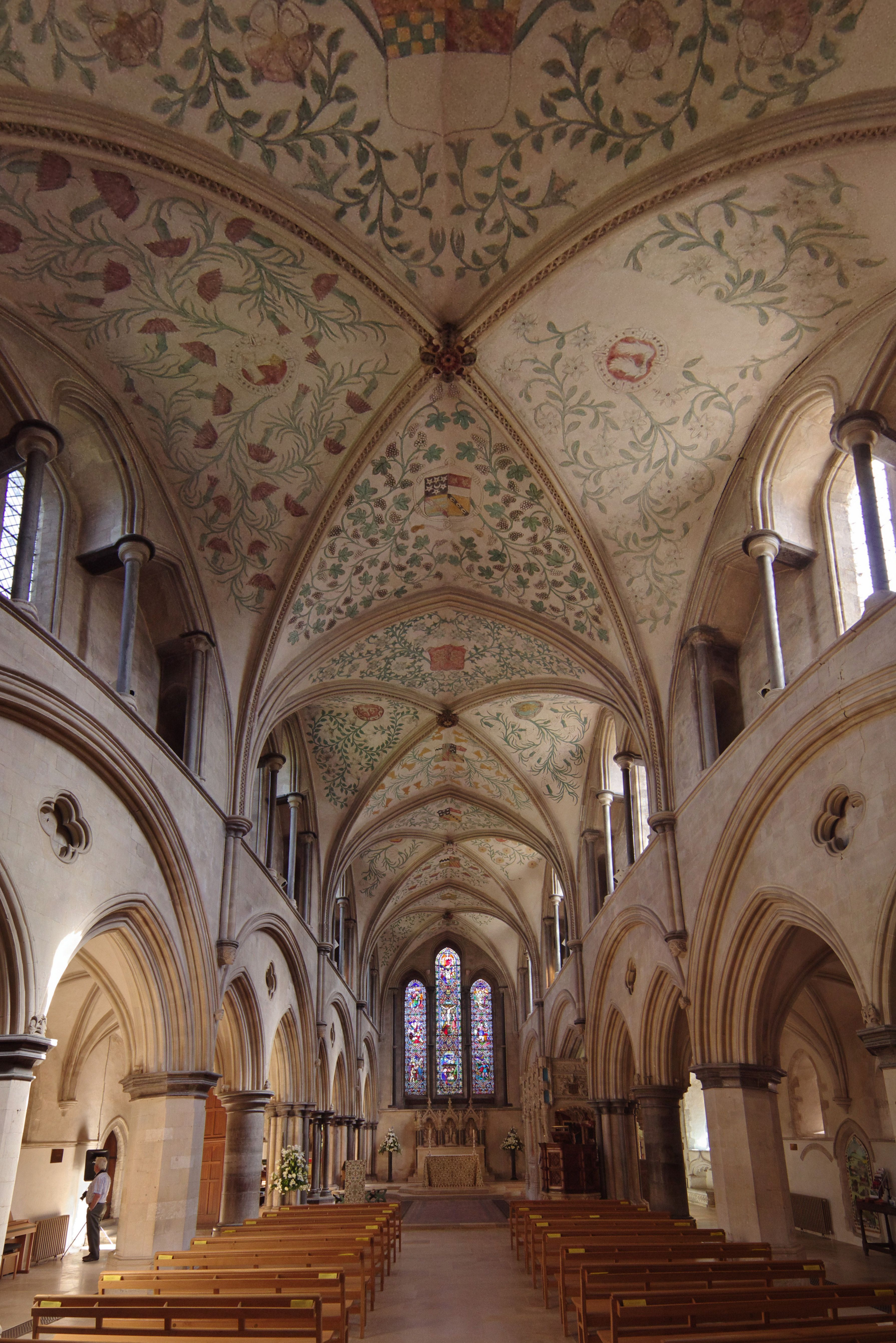
Lambert Barnard painted the ceiling of Boxgrove Priory, in the nave, with the arms and crests entwined with flowers and foliage, of his patron's Thomas West family

There is a copy of John Lydgate's "Troy Book and Siege of Thebes" in the British Library. The book was originally made for Sir William Herbert, 1st Earl of Pembroke, at some time before 1462, and partially illustrated with eight miniatures. The decoration was completed, between 1516 and 1523, with a further seventeen miniatures that have been attributed to Barnard. However the evidence for this has been inconclusive, with the antiquarian Edward Croft-Murray describing any connection as "very tentative".

As English paintings of the early sixteenth century that were produced outside the ambiance of the royal court, Lambert Barnard's surviving work is rare and should be seen as an important indicator of English regional painting of that time.

== Sources ==
- Brownswood Hotels (2019). "Amberley Castle, 900 years of history in brief" (PDF). Brownsword Hotels. Archived (PDF) from the original on 24 February 2019.
- Chavasse, Ruth (2011). Foster, Paul; Moriarty, Rachel (eds.). "The Bishop's Portrait Medallions in their Renaissance and Reformation Context: A Note on Episcopal Authority as Interpreted by Bishop Sherborn and Lambert Barnard". Otter Memorial Paper. Chichester—The Palace and its Bishops. 27. University of Chichester. ISBN 978-1-907-85203-9.
- Clarkson, Rev. George Arthur (1865). "Notes on Amberley it's Castle, Church etc". Sussex Archaeological Collections. 17. Lewes: Sussex Archaeological Society.
- Clarkson, Rev. George Arthur (1865). "A Series of Paintings in Amberley Castle". Archaeological Journal. 22. London. doi:10.5284/1018054.
- Coke, Karen (2007). "The Amberley Castle Panels and a Drawing by William Henry Brooke" (PDF). Sussex Archaeological Collections. 145. Lewes: Sussex Archaeological Society. doi:10.5284/1000334.
- Coke, Karen (2011). Foster, Paul; Moriarty, Rachel (eds.). "Bishop Robert Sherburne and Lambert Barnard: an English response to Italian pictorial practice?". Otter Memorial Paper. Chichester—The Palace and its Bishops. 27. University of Chichester. ISBN 978-1-907-85203-9.
- Coke, Karen (2014). Dimmock, M.; Hadfield, A.; Quinn, p. (eds.). "Lambert Barnard Bishop Sherborn's 'Paynter'". Art, Literature and Religion in Early Modern Sussex: Culture and Conflict. Farnham: Ashgate Publishing. ISBN 978-1-40945-703-9.
- Coke, Karen (2014), Lambert Barnard, Chichester's Tudor Painter, Chichester: Dean And Chapter of Chichester Cathedral, ISBN 978-0-992-87140-6
- Croft-Murray, Edward (1957). "Lambert Barnard: An English Early Renaissance Painter'". Archaeological Journal. 113: 108–125. doi:10.1080/00665983.1956.10854106.
- Foster, Paul (2011). Foster, Paul; Moriarty, Rachel (eds.). "The Tudor Room Heraldic Ceiling". Otter Memorial Paper. Chichester—The Palace and its Bishops. 27. University of Chichester. ISBN 978-1-907-85203-9.
- Hadfield, Andrew; Dimmock, Matthew (2016). Art, Literature and Religion in Early Modern Sussex: Culture and Conflict. Taylor & Francis. ISBN 978-1-317-17839-2.
- Horsfield, Thomas Walker (1835), The History, Antiquities and Topography of the County of Sussex, vol. II, Lewes: Sussex Press, OCLC 24139360
- Kirby, D. (1992), The Earliest English Kings, London: Routledge, ISBN 978-0-415-09086-5
- Lower, Mark Antony (1865). The Worthies of Sussex. Lewes: Sussex Advertiser. OCLC 249704190.
- Lydgate, John; Brook, Troy; Cornish, William; Skelton, John; Peer, William; et al. (1457–1530). "Royal MS 18 D 11". Digitised Manuscripts. London: British Library.
- Tittler, Robert (2011). "Barnard, Lambert (d. 1567/8), painter and calligrapher". Oxford Dictionary of National Biography (online ed.). Oxford University Press. (Subscription, Wikipedia Library access or UK public library membership required.)
- Tudor-Craig, Pamela (2000), Biddle, Martin (ed.), Iconography of the Painting, King Arthur’s Round Table, Woodbridge, Suffolk: The Boydell Press, ISBN 978-0-85115-626-2
- Woolfson, Jonathan; Lush, Deborah (2007). "Lambert Barnard in Chichester Cathedral: Ecclesiastical Politics and the Tudor Royal Image". Antiquaries Journal. 87: 259–280. doi:10.1017/S0003581500000913. S2CID 154913240.
