= Edward Heron-Allen =

British writer and scientist (1861–1943)

Edward Heron-Allen FRS
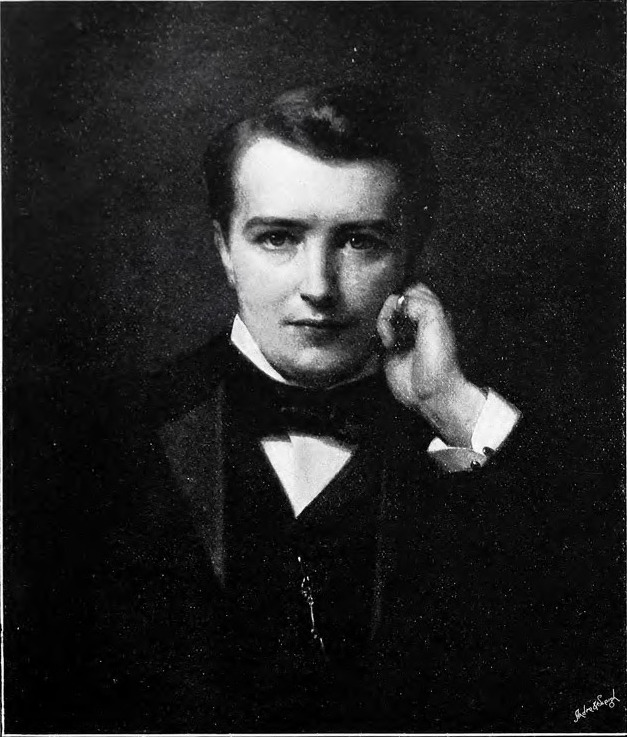
- portrait by Rudolf Lehmann
- Born: Edward Heron Allen (not hyphenated); 17 December 1861; London, England, United Kingdom
- Died: 26 March 1943 (aged 81); Large Acres, Selsey, West Sussex, England, United Kingdom
- Education: Elstree School; Harrow School
- Occupations: Lawyer, Scholar, Scientist
- Spouse(s): Marianna (died 1902); Edith Emily
- Children: 2 daughters
- Writing career
- Pen name: Christopher Blayre
- Genres: Persian Literature, Horror, Zoology, Local History, Palmistry, Foraminifera, Music
- Subject: Various
- Notable works: Violin-Making as it Was and Is, Manual of Cheirosophy, The Science of the Hand, Rubaiyat of Omar Khayyam, The Lament of Baba Tahir, Edward Heron-Allen's Journal of the Great War
- Website: www.heronallensociety.co.uk

Edward Heron-Allen FRS (born Edward Heron Allen) (17 December 1861 – 26 March 1943) was an English polymath, writer, scientist and Persian scholar who translated the works of Omar Khayyam.

== Life ==
Edward Heron-Allen c.1918.

Heron-Allen was born in London, the youngest of four children of George Allen and Catherine Herring. He was educated at Elstree and Harrow School from 1876, where he developed an interest in classics, science and music (particularly in violin playing); however, he did not attend university. In 1879 he joined the family firm of Allen and Son, solicitors, in Soho, London. The practice office was located close to the violin-making district and Heron-Allen made the acquaintance of Georges Chanot III, a distinguished violin maker, and learned how to make violins, making some himself. He subsequently produced a book on violin making that was still in print over a hundred years later.

In 1885 he studied the Turkish language with Garabet Hagopian, the Armenian envoy in London. In addition to Hagopian, Heron-Allen sought the guidance of Charles Wells, a Turkish lexicographer.

He was an expert on the art of cheiromancy or palmistry, having read palms and analysed the handwriting of luminaries of the period, he wrote several books on the subject and in 1886 went on a lecture tour of the United States. He also cast horoscopes, and did one for Oscar Wilde's elder son Cyril on his birth in June 1885; he delivered it to the parents later in the year, noting in his diary "It grieved them very much".

On his return from the USA he returned to his legal practice in London, but found time to develop his other interests, including the study of Persian. He made friends with Mirza Malkom Khan (Nāẓem-al-Molk), the famous Persian Minister in London and in 1896 he studied colloquial Persian with Mirza ʿAlinaqi of the Persian Legation. In 1897 he began studying with Edward Denison Ross, Professor of Persian at University College, London. He published a literal translation of the Rubaiyat of Omar Khayyam (1898) from the then earliest manuscript in the Bodleian Library, followed by other studies of various versions up to 1908. He also published a translation entitled The Lament of Baba Tahir (1901) from a little-known Persian dialect, Luri.

When his father died in 1911, Heron-Allen retired from practising the law and permanently moved to Selsey in West Sussex. There he produced a book on the history and prehistory of Selsey. He compiled a library of 12,000 books, including a collection of rare books on the violin, which he bequeathed to the Royal School of Music.

A supporter of his local parish church in Selsey, he donated a Church organ to them. It was built and supplied by J. W. Walker & Sons Ltd in 1912, and dedicated to the memory of Heron-Allen's late father.

Heron-Allen also served in World War I and his journal was eventually published in 2002.

He joined the staff of the Directorate of Military Intelligence MI7b at the War Office in May 1918, where he dealt specifically with aerial propaganda.

He spent many years studying foraminifera, for this work he was eventually elected a Fellow of the Royal Society in May, 1919."

Heron-Allen's foraminiferal collections and associated library were bequeathed to the Natural History Museum, London and are now housed in a special room on the second floor of the Department of Palaeontology named The Heron-Allen Library, in his honour. The collection is not just of Heron-Allen's books, but also contains the reprints and manuscripts along with the ephemera which Heron-Allen bound with them, including the associated correspondence, photographs, field-notes, the various proof stages, miscellaneous invoices, artwork, as well as postcards and letters from recipients of his reprints.

Heron-Allen also wrote on archaeology, Buddhist philosophy, the cultivation, gourmet appreciation of and culture of the asparagus, as well as a number of novels and short stories of science fiction and horror written under his pseudonym of "Christopher Blayre.

Heron-Allen was also noted for his fiction writing, especially his stories which were early examples of horror and fantasy.

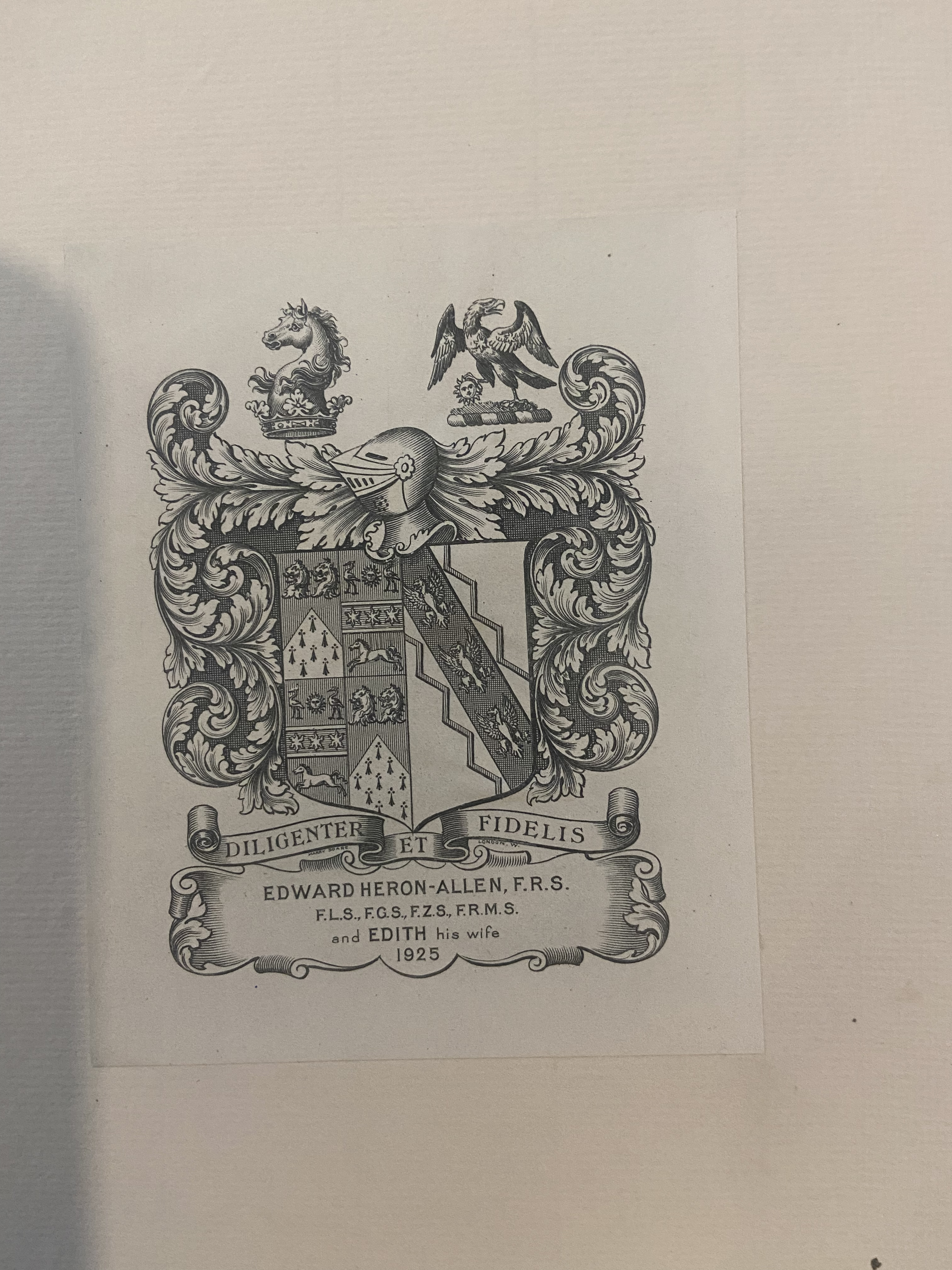
Edward Heron-Allen's bookplate with his coat of arms, 1925

=== Titles and accolades ===
Following list taken from Who, Was Who.

- FRS 1919 – Fellow of the Royal Society.
- FLS – Fellow of the Linnean Society.
- FGS – Fellow of the Geological Society.
- FZS – Fellow of the Zoological Society.
- FRMS – Fellow of the Royal Microscopical Society.
- MRIrish Academy(Hon) – Member of the Royal Irish Academy.
- Accademia Nazionale di Santa Cecilia – Member of the Academy of St Cecilia, Rome. One of the oldest musical institutions in the world.

=== Career ===
Following list taken from Who, Was Who.

- Admitted Solicitor of Supreme Court, 1884;
- Special Commissioner of Music Section of Colonial Exhibition to Italy, 1885;
- Lecturing and writing in United States, 1886–89;
- Student of, and Lecturer upon, Protozoology;
- District Commissioner of Boy Scouts for S.W. Sussex, 1910–19;
- District Commissioner S.W. Sussex for national service, 1916–17;
- Lieut 6th Volunteer Battalion Royal Sussex Regiment, 1917 (France, 1918)
- Attached to Staff Intelligence Dept War Office, 1918;
- President of the Royal Microscopical Society, 1916–18;
- Honorary Member Manchester Microscopical Society;
- Marine Biologist and Zoologist;
- President of the Sette of Odd Volumes, 1927–28;
- President of the National Auricula Society, 1928

== Select bibliography ==
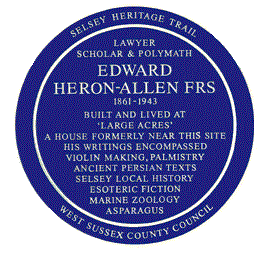

=== Fiction ===
- The Princess Daphne (1885) (novel)
- The Romance of a Quiet Watering Place (Being the Unpremeditated Confessions of a Not Altogether Frivolous Girl) (1888) (novel)
- A Fatal Fiddle (1890) (collection)
- The Purple Sapphire and Other Posthumous Papers Selected from the Unofficial Records of the University of Cosmopoli (1921) (collection)
- The Cheetah Girl (1923) (short story)
- The Strange Papers of Dr Blayre (1932) (collection)
- The Collected Strange Papers of Christopher Blayre (1998) (collection)

=== Other works ===
- Bābā Ṭāhir ʿOryān, The Lament of Bābā Tāhir: Being the Rubā’iyāt of Bābā Tāhir, Hamandāni ('Uryān). Translated by Edward Heron-Allen and Rendered into English Verse by Elizabeth Curtis Brenton, London, 1902.
- ʿOmar Ḵayyām, Edward FitzGerald's Rubâ’iyât of Omar Khayyâm with Their Original Persian Sources, Collated from his Own MSS., London, 1899.
- "The Philosophy of žUmar Khayyám," Edward Fitzgerald, 1809–1909: Centenary Celebrations Souvenir, Ipswich, 1909, pp. 17–20.
- "On the Place of the Rubá’i in Persian Poetry with especial reference to the Rubá’iyyát of Omar Khayyám," ThePoetry Review II/5, May 1913, pp. 205–20.
- "Presidential Inaugural Address," The Year-Boke of Ye Sette of Odd Volumes: Fiftieth Year, 1927–1928, Oxford, 1929, pp. 2–29.
- Some Sidelights Upon Edward FitzGerald's Poem, "The Ruba’iyat of Omar Khayyām": Being the Substance of a Lecture Delivered at the Grosvenor Crescent Club and Women's Institute on 22 March 1898, London, 1898b.
- ʿOmar Ḵayyām, Edward FitzGerald's Rubâ’iyât of Omar Khayyâm with Their Original Persian Sources, Collated from his Own MSS., and Literally Translated by Edward Heron-Allen, London, 1899.
- The Ruba’iyat: Being a Facsimile of the Manuscript in the Bodleian
- Library at Oxford, with a Transcript into Modern Persian Characters, Translated, with an Introduction and Notes, and a Bibliography, by Edward Heron-Allen, London, 1898a.
- The Ruba’iyat of Omar Khayyam: Being a Facsimile of the Manuscript in the Bodleian Library at Oxford, with a Transcript into Modern Persian Characters, Translated, with an Introduction and Notes, and a Bibliography, and Some Sidelights upon Edward FitzGerald's Poem by Edward Heron-Allen. Second edition, carefully revised and considerably enlarged, London, 1898c.
- The Second Edition of Edward FitzGerald's Rubá’iyyát of žUmar Khayyám, London, 1908.
- Memoranda of Memorabilia Encountered in the Course of a Sentimental Journey through the Correspondence of Marie de Rabutin-Chantal, Marquise de Sévigné and her Friends. Oxford, Ye Sette of Odd Volumes, 1928.
