= Bury the Hatchet (film) =

- Directed by: Aaron Walker
- Written by: Aaron Walker
- Produced by: George Ingmire; Julie Gustafson
- Cinematography: Aaron Walker
- Edited by: Aaron Walker; Tim Watson; Amy Sanderson; Joe Bini
- Music by: The Wild Tchoupitoulas; Monk Boudreaux; Preservation Hall Jazz Band; Dirty Dozen Brass Band; Baby Dodds Trio; George Winston; Jimmy Scott; Arvo Pärt; Donald Harrison Jr.
- Production companies: Cine-Marais; Altaire Productions
- Distributed by: 7th Art Releasing
- Release date: 2010
- Running time: 86 minutes
- Country: United States
- Language: English

Bury the Hatchet is a 2010 documentary film directed by Aaron Walker. The film is a portrait of the Mardi Gras Indians of New Orleans.

== Synopsis ==
Bury the Hatchet is a portrait of three Mardi Gras Indian Big Chiefs of New Orleans, descendants of runaway slaves taken in by the Native Americans of the Louisiana bayous. Once plagued by intertribal violence, today these African-American tribes take to the backstreets of New Orleans on Mardi Gras, dressed in elaborate Native American influenced costumes that they sew over the course of the year. When tribes meet instead of attacking each other with hatchets and knives, they battle over which Chief has the prettiest suit.

The film follows Big Chiefs Alfred Doucette, Victor Harris and Monk Boudreaux over the course of five years, both pre and post Hurricane Katrina, and is an exploration of their art and philosophies, as well as their struggles within their communities: harassment by the police, violence amongst themselves, gentrification of their neighborhoods, uninterested youth, old age and natural disaster.

Filmmaker Aaron Walker gained access to a little-seen side of New Orleans and found a distinctive culture, along with the people who carry it forward. The film follows members of this community---tradition-bearers, artists, and musicians---whose determination to preserve their way of life remains strong.

== Festivals ==
A selection of the Hot Docs International Documentary Festival in 2011, the film won the Best Louisiana Feature Award at the New Orleans Film festival and won the Grand Prize and Intangible Culture Award at the Royal Anthropological Institute Festival of Ethnographic Film in Leeds, England. The film has screened at numerous other festivals, including the Florida Film Festival and the Margaret Mead Film Festival.
