= John Securis =

English physician (fl. 1550–1580)

John Securis (fl. 1500–1580) was an English physician and medical writer. He studied in Paris and afterwards at Oxford. He was probably licensed to practise physic by the bishop of Salisbury, where he lived. He published medical and other works.

== Sources ==
- Moore, Norman; Bakewell, Sarah (2004). "Securis [Hatchett], John (fl. 1550–1580), physician". Oxford Dictionary of National Biography (online ed.). Oxford University Press. doi:10.1093/ref:odnb/25001. (Subscription, Wikipedia Library access or UK public library membership required.)

Attribution:

- This article incorporates text from a publication now in the public domain: Moore, Norman (1897). "Securis, John". In Lee, Sidney (ed.). Dictionary of National Biography. Vol. 51. London: Smith, Elder & Co. p. 174.
