= Hatchet man =

Hatchet man (or similar) may refer to:

== Films ==
- The Hatchet Man, a 1932 film
- The Nature of the Beast (1995 film), UK title Hatchet Man

== Others ==
- Hatchet man (idiom), a slang term for someone who was brought in to a situation to perform distasteful tasks
- Towards the end of the 19th century, the phrase was used to describe a Chinese assassin who carried a hatchet, which originated from New York's Doyers Street
- The logo of independent label Psychopathic Records, a stylized silhouette of a running man wielding a meat cleaver
