= List of state leaders in the 8th century =

This is a list of state leaders in the 8th century (701–800) AD.

== Africa ==
=== Africa: Northeast ===
- Makuria (complete list) –

- Merkourios, King (696–710)
- Simeon, King (early 8th century)
- Abraham, King (early 8th century)
- Markos, King (mid 8th century)
- Kyriakos, King (c.747–768)
- Mikhael, King (c.785/794–804/813)

=== Africa: Northcentral ===
- Ifriqiya (complete list) –

- Abd al-Rahman ibn Habib al-Fihri, Emir (745–755)
- Ilyas ibn Habib al-Fihri, Emir (755)
- Habib ibn Abd al-Rahman al-Fihri, Emir (755–757)

- Rustamid dynasty (complete list) –

- ʿAbdu r-Rahman ibn Bahram ibn Rūstam (Bānū-Bādūsyān), Imam (776–788)
- ʿAbdu l-Wahhab ibn Abd ar-Rahman, Imam (788–824)

=== Africa: Northwest ===
- Barghawata (complete list) –

- Tarif al-Matghari, King (?–744)
- Ṣāliḥ ibn Tarīf, King (744–?)
- Ilyâs ibn Sâlih, King (792–842)

- Idrisid dynasty (complete list) –

- Idris I, King (788–791)
- Idris II, King (791–828)

- Kingdom of Nekor (complete list) –

- Salih I ibn Mansur, King (710–749)
- al-Mu'tasim ibn Salih, King (749–?)
- Idris I ibn Salih, King (?–760)
- Sa'id I ibn Idris, King (760–803)

== Americas ==
=== Americas: Mesoamerica ===
Maya civilization

- Calakmul (complete list) –

- Yuknoom Tookʼ Kʼawiil, King (c.702–731)
- Wamaw Kʼawiil, King (c.736)
- Ruler Y, King (c.741)
- Great Serpent, King (c.751)
- Bolon Kʼawiil, King (771–c.789)

- Copán (complete list) –

- Uaxaclajuun Ubʼaah Kʼawiil, King (695–738)
- Kʼakʼ Joplaj Chan Kʼawiil, King (738–749)
- Kʼakʼ Yipyaj Chan Kʼawiil, King (749–763)
- Yax Pasaj Chan Yopaat, King (763–post-810)

- Palenque (complete list) –

- Kʼinich Kan Bahlam II, Ajaw (684–702)
- Kʼinich Kʼan Joy Chitam II, Ajaw (702–711)
- Kʼinich Ahkal Moʼ Nahb III, Ajaw (721–c.736)
- Kʼinich Janaab Pakal II, Ajaw (c.764)
- Kʼinich Kan Bahlam II, Ajaw (c.751)
- Kʼinich Kʼukʼ Bahlam II, Ajaw (764–c.783)
- Janaab Pakal III, Ajaw (799–?)

- Tikal (complete list) –

- Jasaw Chan Kʼawiil I, Ajaw (682–734)
- Yikʼin Chan Kʼawiil, Ajaw (734–c.746)
- 28th Ruler, Ajaw (c.766–768)
- Yax Nuun Ahiin II, Ajaw (768–c.794)
- Nuun Ujol Kʼinich, Ajaw (c.800)

== Asia ==
=== Asia: Central ===
Tibet

- Tibetan Empire (complete list) –

- Tridu Songtsen, Emperor (676–704)
- Khri ma lod, Empress (675–689, 704–712)
- Lha, Emperor (704–705)
- Mé Aktsom, Emperor (705–755)
- Trisong Detsen, Emperor (755–797)
- Muné Tsenpo, Emperor (797–c.799)
- Mutik Tsenpo, disputed Emperor (c.799)
- Sadnalegs, Emperor (c.800/04–c.815)

=== Asia: East ===
Turks

- Second Turkic Khaganate (complete list) –

- Qapaghan, Qaghan (694–716)
- Inel, Qaghan (716–717)
- Bilge, Qaghan (717–734)
- Yollig, Qaghan (734–739)
- Tengli, Qaghan (c.740)
- Kutluk Yabgu, Qaghan (741–742)
- Özmiş, Qaghan (742–744)
- Kulun Beg, Qaghan (744–745)

- Uyghur Khaganate (complete list) –

- Kutlug I Bilge, Khagan (744–747)
- Bayanchur, Khagan (747–759)
- Qutlugh tarqan sengün, Khagan (759–779)
- Alp qutlugh bilge, Khagan (779–789)
- Ai tengride bulmïsh külüg bilge, Khagan (789–790)
- Qutlugh bilge, Khagan (790–795)
- Ai tengride ülüg bulmïsh alp qutlugh ulugh bilge, Khagan (795–808)

China: Tang dynasty

- Zhou dynasty –

- Wu Zetian, Empress regnant (690–705)

- Tang dynasty (complete list) –

- Ruizong, Emperor (684–690, 710–712)
- Shang, Emperor (710)
- Ruizong, Emperor (684–690, 710–712)
- Xuanzong, Emperor (712–756)
- Suzong, Emperor (756–762)
- Daizong, Emperor (762–779)
- Dezong, Emperor (780–805)

Japan

- Nara period Japan (complete list) –

- Monmu, Emperor (697–707)
- Genmei, Empress (707–715)
- Genshō, Empress (715–724)
- Shōmu, Emperor (724–749)
- Kōken, Empress (749–758)
- Junnin, Emperor (758–764)
- Shōtoku, Empress (764–770)
- Kōnin, Emperor (770–781)
- Kanmu, Emperor (781–806)

Korea: North–South States Period

- Balhae (complete list) –

- Go, King (698–719)
- Mu, King (719–737)
- Mun, King (737–793)
- Dae Won-ui, King (793)
- Seong, King (793–794)
- Gang, King (794–809)

- Later Silla (complete list) –

- Hyoso, King (692–702)
- Seongdeok, King (702–737)
- Hyoseong, King (737–742)
- Gyeongdeok, King (742–765)
- Hyegong, King (765–780)
- Seondeok, King (780–785)
- Wonseong, King (785–798)
- Soseong, King (798–800)
- Aejang, King (800–809)

=== Asia: Southeast ===
Cambodia

- Chenla (complete list) –

- Jayadevi, Queen (c.681–713)

- Mataram kingdom: Shailendra dynasty/Sanjaya dynasty (complete list) –

- Sanjaya, King (732–746)
- Panangkaran, King (760–775)
- Dharanindra, King (775–800)
- Samaragrawira, King (800–819)

Indonesia: Java

- East Java –

- Dewasimha, King (7th/8th century)
- Gajayana, King (8th century)
- A[…]nana, King (fl.760)

- Kalingga Kingdom: Shailendra dynasty –

- Shima, Queen (674—703)

- Shailendra dynasty –

- Mandimiñak, King (703—710)
- Sanna, King (710—717)

- Mataram kingdom: Shailendra dynasty/Sanjaya dynasty (complete list) –

- Sanjaya, King (716–746)
- Panangkaran, King (760—775)
- Dharanindra, King (775—800)
- Samaragrawira, King (800—812)

- Sunda Kingdom (complete list) –

- Tarusbawa, Maharaja (669–723)
- Sanjaya, Maharaja (723)
- Rakeyan Panaraban, Maharaja (732–739)
- Rakeyan Banga, Maharaja (739–766)
- Rakeyan Medang Prabu Hulukujang, Maharaja (766–783)
- Prabu Gilingwesi, Maharaja (783–795)
- Pucukbumi Darmeswara, Maharaja (795–819)

- Galuh Kingdom (complete list) –

- Wretikandayun, Maharaja (612-702)
- Mandiminyak, Maharaja (702-709)
- Bratasena, Maharaja (709-716)
- Purbasora, Maharaja (716-723)
- Premanadikusuma, Maharaja (723-732)
- Tamperan Barmawijaya, Maharaja (732-739)
- Manarah, Maharaja (739-783)
- Guruminda Sang Minisri, Maharaja (783-799)

Malaysia: Peninsular

- Kedah Sultanate (complete list) –

- DiMaharaja Putra II, Maharaja (c.660–712)
- Darma Maharaja, Maharaja (c.712–788)
- Maha Jiwa, Maharaja (c.788–832)

Thailand

- Hariphunchai (complete list) –

- Camadevi, Queen (7th/8th century)

- Ngoenyang (complete list) –

- Lao Sao, King (7th–8th century)
- Lao Tang, King (early 8th century)
- Lao Ghrom, King (mid 8th century)
- Lao Lheaw, King (late 8th century)
- Lao Gab, King (8th–9th century)

Vietnam

- Champa (complete list) –

- Vikrantavarman II, King (c.686–c.731)
- Rudravarman II, King (c.731–c.758)
- Prithindravarman, King (c.758–?)
- Satyavarman, King (c.770–c.787)
- Indravarman I, King (c.787–c.803)

- Mai Uprising of Annam (complete list) –

- Mai Thúc Loan, Emperor (713–723)

- Phùng Uprising (complete list) –

- Phùng Hưng, King (779–791)
- Phùng An, King (791)

=== Asia: South ===
Afghanistan

- Turk Shahi (complete list) –

- Shahi Tegin, King (680–739)
- Fromo Kesaro, King (739–745)
- Bo Fuzhun, King (745–?)
- Khinkhil, King (c.780–785)

Bengal and Northeast India

- Kamarupa: Mlechchha dynasty (complete list) –

- Kumara, King (695–710)
- Vajra, King (710–725)
- Harshavarman, King (725–745)
- Balavarman II, King (745–760)
- Salambha, King (795–815)

- Khadga dynasty –

- Rajabhat, King (673–707)
- Balabhat, King (707–716)

- Mallabhum (complete list) –

- Adi Malla, King (694–710)
- Jay Malla, King (710–720)
- Kinu Malla, King (733–742)
- Kanu Malla, King (757–764)
- Shur Malla, King (775–795)

- Pala Empire (complete list) –

- Gopala I, King (8th century)
- Dharmapala, King (8th–9th century)

India

- Chahamanas of Shakambhari (complete list) –

- Naradeva, King (c.709–721)
- Ajayaraja I, King (c.721–734)
- Vigraharaja I, King (c.734–759)
- Chandraraja I, King (c.759–771)
- Gopendraraja, King (c.771–784)
- Durlabharaja I, King (c.784–809)

- Chalukya dynasty (complete list) –

- Vijayaditya, King (696–733)
- Vikramaditya II, King (733–746)
- Kirtivarman II, King (746–753)

- Eastern Chalukyas (complete list) –

- Mangi Yuvaraja, King (682–706)
- Jayasimha II, King (706–718)
- Kokkili, King (719)
- Vishnuvardhana III, King (719–755)
- Vijayaditya I (Eastern Chalukya), King (755–772)
- Vishnuvardhana IV, King (772–808)

- Western Ganga dynasty (complete list) –

- Shivamara I, King (679–726)
- Sripurusha, King (726–788)
- Shivamara II, King (788–816)

- Gurjara-Pratihara dynasty (complete list) –

- Nagabhata I, King (730–760)
- Kakustha and Devaraja, Kings (760–780)
- Vatsaraja, King (780–800)
- Nagabhata II, King (800–833)

- Kalachuris of Tripuri (complete list) –

- Shankaragana I, King (750–775)

- Maitraka dynasty (complete list) –

- Śīlāditya III, King (c.690–c.710)
- Śīlāditya IV, King (c.710–c.740)
- Śīlāditya V, King (c.740–c.762)
- Śīlāditya VI Dhrubhatta, King (c.762–c.776)

- Pallava dynasty –

- The Pallava dynasty has two chronologies of rulers.
- Paramesvaravarman II, King (705–710)
- Nandivarman II, King (mid/late 8th century)
- Dantivarman, King (late 8th–early 9th century)

- Pandyan dynasty (complete list) –

- Kochadaiyan Ranadhiran, King (710–735)
- Maravarman Rajasimha I, King (735–765)
- Parantaka Nedunjadaiyan, King (765–815)
- Rasasingan II, King (790–800)
- Varagunan I, King (800–830)

- Paramara dynasty of Malwa (complete list) –

- Upendra, King (c.800–c.818)

- Rashtrakuta dynasty –

- Dantidurga, King (735–756)
- Krishna I, King (756–774)
- Govinda II, King (774–780)
- Dhruva Dharavarsha, King (780–793)
- Govinda III, King (793–814)

- Sisodia (complete list) –

- Bappa Rawal, Rajput (728–753)
- Khumman, Rajput (753–773)
- Mathatt, Rajput (773–790)
- Bhathabhatt, Rajput (790–813)

Sri Lanka

- Anuradhapura Kingdom, Sri Lanka (complete list) –

- Manavanna, King (691–726)
- Aggabodhi V, King (726–732)
- Kassapa III, King (732–738)
- Mahinda I, King (738–741)
- Aggabodhi VI, King (741–781)
- Aggabodhi VII, King (781–787)
- Mahinda II, King (787–807)

=== Asia: West ===
Syria

- Umayyad Caliphate (complete list) –

- Abd al-Malik, Caliph (685–705)
- Al-Walid I, Caliph (705–715)
- Sulayman, Caliph (715–717)
- Umar II, Caliph (717–720)
- Yazid II, Caliph (720–724)
- Hisham, Caliph (724–743)
- Al-Walid II, Caliph (743–744)
- Yazid III, Caliph (744)
- Ibrahim, Caliph (744)
- Marwan II, Caliph (744–750)

Mesopotamia

- Abbasid Caliphate, Baghdad (complete list) –

- as-Saffah, Caliph (750–754)
- al-Mansur, Caliph (754–775)
- al-Mahdi, Caliph (775–785)
- al-Hadi, Caliph (785–786)
- Harun al-Rashid, Caliph (786–809)

Tabaristan

- Dabuyid dynasty (complete list) –

- Dabuya, Spahbed (660–712)
- Farrukhan the Great, Spahbed (712–728)
- Dadhburzmihr, Spahbed (728–740/741)
- Farrukhan the Little, Spahbed (740/741–747/748)
- Khurshid, Spahbed (740–759/760)

Yemen

- Yemeni Zaidi State (complete list) –

- Al-Hasan al-Muthanna, Imam (680–706)
- Zayd ibn Ali, Imam (706–740)
- Hasan ibn Zayd ibn Hasan, Imam (740–783)
- Muhammad ibn Ja'far al-Sadiq, Imam (783–818)

== Europe ==
=== Europe: Balkans ===
- First Bulgarian Empire (complete list) –

- Tervel, Khan (7th–8th century)
- Kormesiy, Khan (early 8th century)
- Sevar, Khan (early-mid 8th century)
- Kormisosh, Khan (mid 8th century)
- Vinekh, Khan (754/756–762)
- Telets, Knyaz (762–765)
- Sabin, Khan (765–766)
- Umor, Khan (766)
- Toktu, Khan (766–767)
- Pagan, Khan (767–768)
- Telerig, Khan (768–777)
- Kardam, Khan (777–803)

- Byzantine Empire (complete list) –

- Tiberios III, Emperor (698–705)
- Justinian II, co-Emperor (681–685), Emperor (685–695, 705–711)
- Tiberius, Co-Emperor (706–711)
- Philippikos Bardanes, Emperor (711–713)
- Anastasios II, Emperor (713–715)
- Theodosius III, Emperor (715–717)
- Leo III the Isaurian, Emperor (717–741)
- Constantine V, co-Emperor (720–741), Emperor (741–780)
- Artabasdos, Emperor (741–743)
- Leo IV the Khazar, co-Emperor (751–775), Emperor (775–780)
- Constantine VI, Co-Emperor (776–780), Emperor (780–797)
- Irene, Regent (780–790, 792–797), Empress (797–802)

- Croatia (complete list) –

- Višeslav, Duke (c.785–c.802)

- Principality of Serbia (complete list) –

- Višeslav (fl. c.780)

=== Europe: British Isles ===
Great Britain: Scotland

- Dál Riata (complete list) –

- Fiannamail ua Dúnchado, King (?–700)
- Béc ua Dúnchado, King (?–707)
- Dúnchad Bec, King (?–721)
- Selbach mac Ferchair, King (?–723)
- Dúngal mac Selbaig, King (?–726)
- Eochaid mac Echdach, King (726–733)
- Muiredach mac Ainbcellaig, King (733–736)
- Alpín mac Echdach, King (unknown)
- Eógan mac Muiredaig, King (unknown)
- Indrechtach mac Fiannamail, King (?–741)
- Áed Find, King (pre–768–778)
- Fergus mac Echdach, King (778–781)
- Eochaid mac Áeda Find, King (unknown)
- Caustantín mac Fergusa, King (unknown)

- Picts (complete list) –

- Bridei IV, King (697–706)
- Nechtan, King (706–724, 728–729)
- Drest VII, King (724–726)
- Alpín I, King (726–728)
- Óengus I, King (729–761)
- Bridei V, King (761–763)
- Ciniod I, King (763–775)
- Alpín II, King (775–778)
- Talorgan II, King (778–782)
- Drest VIII, King (782–783)
- Conall, King (785–789)
- Constantine (I), King (789–820)

- Kingdom of Strathclyde / Alt Clut (complete list) –

- Beli II, King (694–722)
- Teudebur, King (722–750)
- Rotri, King (750–754)
- Dumnagual III, King (754–760)
- Eugein II(760–780)
- Riderch II, King (780–798)
- Cynan, King (798–816)

- Isle of Man (complete list) –

- Tudwal, King (c.710)
- Sandde, King (c.730)
- Elidyr, King (c.790)

Great Britain: Northumbria

- Kingdom of Northumbria (complete list) –

- Ealdfrith, King (685–704/705)
- Eadwulf I, King (704–705)
- Osred I, King (705–716)
- Coenred, King (716–718)
- Osric, King (718–729)
- Ceolwulf, King (729–737)
- Eadberht, King (737/738–758)
- Oswulf, King (758–759)
- Æthelwald Moll, King (759–765)
- Ealhred, King (765–774)
- Æthelred I, King (774–779)
- Ælfwald I, King (788–790)
- Osred II, King (790–796)
- Osbald, King (796)
- Eardwulf, King (796–806/808)

Great Britain: England

- The Britons (complete list) –

- Geraint, King (c.670–c.710)
- Rhodri Molwynog, King (c.712–754)
- Cynan Dindaethwy, King (798–816)

- Dumnonia (complete list) –

- Donyarth ap Culmin, King (c.661–c.700)
- Geraint of Dumnonia, King (c.700–c.710)

- Kingdom of East Anglia (complete list) –

- Ealdwulf, King (663–c.713)
- Ælfwald, King (713–749)
- Beonna, Co-King (749–c.760)
- Alberht, Co-King (749–c.760)
- Æthelred I, Sub-King (760s–770s)
- Æthelberht II, King (c.779–794)
- Offa, King (c.796), also King of Kent and of Mercia
- Eadwald, King (c.796–c.800)

- Kingdom of Essex (complete list) –

- Sigeheard, Co-King (694–709)
- Swæfred, Co-King (694–709)
- Offa, King (709)
- Sælred, Co-King (c.709–746)
- Swæfberht, Co-King (c.715–738)
- Swithred, King (746–758)
- Sigeric, King (758–798)
- Sigered

- King (798–812)
- Duke (812–825)

- Kingdom of Kent (complete list) –

- Wihtred, King (c.693–725)
- Alric, King (725–?)
- Eadbert I, King (725–748)
- Æthelbert II, King (725–762)
- Eardwulf, King (unknown)
- Eadberht II, King (fl. 762)
- Sigered, King (fl. 762)
- Eanmund, King (unknown)
- Heaberht, King (fl. 764–765)
- Egbert II, King (fl. 765–779)
- Ealhmund, King (fl. 784)
- Eadberht III Præn, King (796–798)
- Cuthred, King (797/798–807)

- Mercia (complete list) –

- Æthelred I, King (675–704)
- Coenred, King (704–709)
- Ceolred, King (709–716)
- Ceolwald, King (c.716 )
- Æthelbald, King (716–757)
- Beornred, King (757)
- Offa, King (757–796), also King of Kent and of East Anglia
- Ecgfrith, King (796)
- Coenwulf, King (796–821), also King of Kent and of East Anglia

- Kingdom of Sussex (complete list) –

- Noðhelm, King (fl. 692–717)
- Watt, King (fl. 692–c.700)
- Bryni, King (fl. c.700)
- Osric? ]], King (fl. c.710)
- Æðelstan, King (fl. 717)
- Æðelberht, King (fl. c.740)
- Osmund, King (fl. 760–772)
- Oswald, King (fl. 772)
- Oslac, King (fl. c.765–772)
- Ealdwulf, King (fl. c.765–c.791)
- Ælfwald, King (fl. c.765–772)

- Kingdom of Wessex (complete list) –

- Ine, King (688–726)
- Æthelheard, King (726–740)
- Cuthred, King (740–756)
- Sigeberht, King (756–757)
- Cynewulf, King (757–786)
- Beorhtric, King (786–802)

Great Britain: Wales

- Morgannwg (complete list) –

- Morgan ab Athrwys, the Generous, King (fl.c.730)
- Ithel ap Morgan, King (710/15–c.745)

- Glywysing (complete list) –

- Meurig ab Ithel, Rhodri, Rhys, each ruled part (c.755–785)
- Arthfael Hen ap Rhys, King (785–c.825)

- Gwent (complete list) –

- Ffernfael ab Idwal, King (?–c.775)
- Athrwys ap Ffernfael, King (774–810)

- Kingdom of Gwynedd (complete list) –

- Idwal Roebuck, King (c.682–c.720)
- Rhodri Molwynog ap Idwal, King (c.720–c.754)
- Caradog ap Meirion, King (c.754–c.798)
- Cynan Dindaethwy ap Rhodri, King (c.798–816)

- Kingdom of Powys (complete list) –

- Gwylog ap Beli, King (695–725)
- Elisedd ap Gwylog, King (725–c.755)
- Brochfael ap Elisedd, King (c.755–773)
- Cadell ap Brochfael, King (773–808)

- Seisyllwg –

- Arthen ap Seisyll, King (700–735)
- Dyfnwal ap Arthwyr, King (735–770)
- Meurig ap Dyfnwal, King (770–807)

Ireland

- Ireland (complete list) –

- Loingsech mac Óengusso, High King (694–701)
- Congal Cennmagair, High King (702–708)
- Fergal mac Máele Dúin, High King (709–718)
- Fogartach mac Néill, High King (719)
- Cináed mac Írgalaig, High King (720–722)
- Flaithbertach mac Loingsig, High King (723–729)
- Áed Allán, High King (730–738)
- Domnall Midi, High King (739–758)
- Niall Frossach, High King (759–765)
- Donnchad Midi, High King (766–792)
- Áed Oirdnide, High King (793–817)

- Kingdom of Ailech (complete list) –

- Fergal mac Máele Dúin, King (700–722)
- Áed Allán mac Fergaile, King (722–743)
- Niall Frossach mac Fergaile, King (743–770)
- Máel Dúin mac Áedo Alláin, King (770–788)
- Áed Oirdnide mac Néill, King (788–819)

- Kingdom of Breifne (complete list) –

- Dub Dothra, King (c.743)
- Cormacc mac Duibh Dá Críoch, King (c.790)
- Muircheartach mac Donnghal, King (c.800–806)

- Connachta (complete list) –

- Muiredach Muillethan, King (697–702)
- Cellach mac Rogallaig, King (702–705)
- Indrechtach mac Dúnchado, King (705–707)
- Domnall mac Cathail, King (707–715)
- Indrechtach mac Muiredaig, King (707/715–723)
- Domnall mac Cellaig, King (723–728)
- Cathal mac Muiredaig, King (728–735)
- Áed Balb mac Indrechtaig, King (735–742)
- Forggus mac Cellaig, King (742–756)
- Ailill Medraige mac Indrechtaig, King (756–764)
- Dub-Indrecht mac Cathail, King (764–768)
- Donn Cothaid mac Cathail, King (768–773)
- Flaithrí mac Domnaill, King (773–777)
- Artgal mac Cathail, King (777–782)
- Tipraiti mac Taidg, King (782–786)
- Cináed mac Artgail, King (786–792)
- Colla mac Fergusso, King (792–796)
- Muirgius mac Tommaltaig, King (796–815)

- Leinster (complete list) –

- Cellach Cualann, King (693–715)
- Murchad mac Brain Mut, King (715–727)
- Dúnchad mac Murchado, King (727–728)
- Fáelán mac Murchado, King (728–738)
- Bran Becc mac Murchado, King (738)
- Áed mac Colggen, King (738)
- Muiredach mac Murchado, King (738–760)
- Ruaidrí mac Fáeláin, King (776–785)
- Bran ua Máele Dúin, King (785–795)
- Fínsnechta Cethardec, King (795–808)

- Kingdom of Meath (complete list) –

- Domnall Midi mac Murchado, King (743–763)
- Fallomon mac Con Congalt, King (c.763–766)
- Donnchad Midi, King (766–797)
- Domnall mac Donnchada Midi, King (797–799)
- Muiredach mac Domnaill Midi, King (799–802)

- Uí Maine (complete list) –

- Seachnasach, King (691–711)
- Dluthach mac Fithcheallach, King (711–738)
- Cathal Maenmaighe, King (738–745)
- Ailello hui Daimine, King (745–749)
- Inreachtach mac Dluthach, King (749–750)
- Aedh Ailghin, King (750–767)
- Dunchadh ua Daimhine, King (767–780)
- Conall mac Fidhghal, King (780–782)
- Duncadho mac Duib Da Tuadh, King (784)
- Amhalgaidh, King (786)
- Ailell mac Inreachtach, King (786–791/799)
- Dub Dá Leithe mac Tomaltach, King (?–816)

- Ulaid / Ulster (complete list) –

- Bécc Bairrche mac Blathmaic, King (692–707)
- Cú Chuarán mac Dúngail Eilni, King (707–708)
- Áed Róin, King (708–735)
- Cathussach mac Ailello, King (735–749)
- Bressal mac Áedo Róin, King (749–750)
- Fiachnae mac Áedo Róin, King (750–789)
- Tommaltach mac Indrechtaig, King (789–790)
- Eochaid mac Fiachnai, King (790–810)

=== Europe: Central ===
- Duchy of Alsace (complete list) –

- Adalbert, Duke (post-683–723)
- Willehari, Duke (709–712)
- Liutfrid, Duke (723–742)

- Duchy of Alemannia

- Gotfrid, Duke (?–709)
- Lantfrid, Duke (709–730)
- Theudebald, Duke (709–746)

- Bavaria (complete list) –

- Theodo, Duke (c.680–716)
- Theodbert, co-Duke (c.716–c.719)
- Theobald, co-Duke (c.716–c.719)
- Tassilo II, co-Duke (c.716–c.719)
- Grimoald, co-Duke (715–725)
- Hugbert, Duke (725–736)
- Odilo, Duke (736–748)
- Grifo, Duke (c.788)
- Tassilo III, Duke (748–788)

- Civitas Schinesghe (complete list) –

- Piast the Wheelwright, Duke (?–861)
- Siemowit, Duke (9th century)

- Prince-Bishopric of Mainz (complete list) –

- Lullus, Prince-archbishop (754–786)
- Richholf, Prince-archbishop (787–813)

- Obotrites (complete list) –

- Witzlaus, Prince (?–c.795)
- Thrasco, Prince (?–c.800)

- Old Saxony (complete list) –

- Theoderic, Duke (fl.743–744)
- Widukind, Duke (fl.777–785)
- Abo, Duke (fl.785–811)

- Sorbs –

- Miliduch, Duke (fl.790–806)

- Duchy of Thuringia (complete list) –

- Heden II, Duke (689–719)

- Veleti –

- Dragovit, Prince (c.740–post-789)

=== Europe: East ===
- Volga Bulgaria (complete list) –

- Kotrag, Potentate (675–710)
- Irkhan, ruler (710–765)
- Tuqyi, ruler (765–815)

- Khazar Khaganate (complete list) –

Ashina dynasty: Khazar Khagans
- Busir, Khagan (c.690–715)
- Barjik, Khagan (late 720s–731)
- Bihar, Khagan (c.732)
- Prisbit, Regent? (late 730s)
- Baghatur, Khagan (c.760)
Khazar Beks
- Alp Tarkhan, Bek (early 8th century)
- Tar'mach, Bek (c.730)
- Hazer Tarkhan, Bek (?–737)
Bulanid dynasty
- Obadiah, ruler (c.786–809)

- Slavs of Lower Pannonia –

- Vojnomir, Duke (c.791–c.810)
- Ljudevit, Duke (c.810–c.823)
- Ratimir, Duke (829–838)
- Braslav, Duke (880–c.896)

=== Europe: Nordic ===
- Sweden (complete list) –

House of Ynglings/Scylfings
- Harald Hildetand, King (c.705–750)
- Sigurd Hring, King (c.750–c.770)
- Ragnar Lodbrok, King (c.770–c.785)
- Östen Beli, King (late 8th century)
House of Ivar Vidfamne
- Sigurd Hring, King (c.750–770)
- Ragnar Lodbrok, King (c.770–785)
- Östen Beli, King (late 8th century)

=== Europe: Southcentral ===
- Principality of Benevento (complete list) –

- Gisulf I, Duke (689–706)
- Romoald II, Duke (706–730)
- Audelais, Duke (730–732)
- Gregory, Duke (733–739)
- Godescalc, Duke (739–742)
- Gisulf II, Duke (742–751)
- Liutprand, Duke (751–758)
- Arechis II, Duke (758–774)
- Arechis II, Prince (774–787)
- Grimoald III, Prince (787–806)

- March of Istria –

- Hunfrid, Margrave (c.799)

- Kingdom of the Lombards (complete list) –

- Liutpert, King (700–702)
- Raginpert, King (701)
- Aripert II, King (702–712)
- Ansprand, King (712)
- Liutprand, King (712–744)
- Hildeprand, King (744)
- Ratchis, King (744–749)
- Aistulf, King (749–756)
- Desiderius, King (756–774)

- Kingdom of Italy, King (complete list) –

- Charlemagne, King (774–814)
- Pepin, King (781–810)

- Papal States (complete list) –

- Stephen II, Pope (752–757)
- Paul I, Pope (757–767)
- Stephen III, Pope (768–772)
- Adrian I, Pope (772–795)
- Leo III, Pope (795–816)

- Duchy of Spoleto (complete list) –

- Transamund I, Duke (665–703)
- Faroald II, Duke (703–724)
- Transamund II, Duke (724–739, 740–742, 744–745)
- Hilderic, Duke (739–740)
- Agiprand, Duke (742–744)
- Lupus, Duke (745–752)
- Unnolf, Duke (752)
- Aistulf, Duke (752–756)
- Ratchis, Duke (756–757)
- Alboin, Duke (757–759)
- Desiderius, Duke (758–759)
- Gisulf, Duke (758–763)
- Theodicius, Duke (763–773)
- Hildeprand, Duke (774–788)
- Winiges, Duke (789–822)

- Republic of Venice (complete list) –

- Paolo Lucio Anafesto, Doge (697–717)
- Marcello Tegalliano, Doge (717–726)
- Orso Ipato, Doge (726–737)
- Dominicus Leo Abrogatis, Magister militum (737)
- Felice Cornicola, Magister militum (738)
- Teodato Ipato, Magister militum (739)
- Gioviano Cepanico Ipato, Magister militum (740)
- Giovanni Fabriciaco, Magister militum (741)
- Teodato Ipato, Doge (742–755)
- Galla Gaulo, Doge (755–756)
- Domenico Monegario, Doge (756–764)
- Maurizio Galbaio, Doge (764–787)
- Giovanni Galbaio, Doge (787–804)

=== Europe: Southwest ===
Iberian Peninsula

- Kingdom of Asturias (complete list) –

- Pelagius, King (718–737)
- Favila, King (737–739)
- Alfonso I, King (739–757)
- Fruela I, King (757–768)
- Aurelius, King (768–774)
- Silo, King (774–783)
- Mauregatus, King (783–788)
- Bermudo I, King (788–791)
- Alfonso II, King (791–842)

- Emirate of Córdoba (complete list) –

- Abd al-Rahman I, Emir (756–788)
- Hisham I, Emir (788–796)
- al-Hakam I, Emir (796–822)

- Visigothic Kingdom (complete list) –

- Egica, King (687–702)
- Wittiza, King (694–710)
- Roderic, King (710–711)
- Agila II, King (711–714)
- Oppas, King (712)
- Ardo, King (714–721)

Marca Hispanica

- County of Osona (complete list) –

- Borrell, Count (798–820)

- County of Cerdanya (complete list) –

- Borrell, Count (798–820)

- County of Urgell (complete list) –

- Borrell, Count (798–820)

=== Europe: West ===
- Champagne (complete list) –

- Drogo, Duke (690–708)
- Arnulf, Duke (707/08–c.723)

- Frisian Kingdom (complete list) –

- Redbad, King (678–719)
- Poppo, King (719–734)

- County of Paris (complete list) –

- Grifo, Count (751–753)
- Gerard I, Count (752–778)
- Stephen, Count (778–811)

- County of Poitou (complete list) –

- Hatton, Count (735–778)
- Renaud, Count (795–843)

Franks

- Frankish Empire –

- Kings (complete list) –

- Childebert III, King (695–711)
- Dagobert III, King (711–715)
- Chilperic II, King (715–721)
- Chlothar IV, King (717–720)
- Theuderic IV, King (721–737)
- Childeric III, King (743–751)

- Mayors of the Palace (complete list) –

- Pepin II of Herstal

- Mayor of the Palace (680–714)
- Duke and Prince of the Franks (687–714)

- Charles Martel

- Duke and Prince of the Franks (714–741)
- Acting King of the Franks (737–741)

- Pepin the Short

- Mayor of the Palace (741–751)
- King (751–768)

- Frankish Empire –

- Charlemagne, King (768–814), Holy Roman Emperor (800–814)

- Austrasia of the Franks (complete list) –

- Childebert III, King (695–711)
- Dagobert III, King (711–715)
- Chilperic II, King (715–717, 720–721)
- Chlothar IV, King (717–720)
- Theuderic IV, King (721–737)
- Childeric III, King (743–751)

- Auvergne (complete list) –

- Ithier, Count (c.758)
- Blandin, Count (760–763)
- Chilping, Count (763–765)
- Bertmond, Count (765–778)
- Icterius, Count (778–?)
- Guerin of Provence, Count (819–839)

- Neustria of the Franks (complete list) –

- Childebert III, King (695–711)
- Dagobert III, King (711–715)
- Chilperic II, King (715–721)
- Theuderic IV, King (721–737)
- Childeric III, King (743–751)

- Duchy of Aquitaine (complete list) –

- Odo the Great, Duke (c.688–c.735)
- Hunald I, Duke (735–748)
- Waifer, Duke (748–767)
- Hunald II, Duke (767–769)
- Lupo II, Duke (768–781)

- County of Toulouse (complete list) –

- Torson, Count (778–790)
- William of Gellone, Count (790–806)

=== Eurasia: Caucasus ===
- Kingdom of Abkhazia (complete list) –

- Constantine I, King (c.680–710)
- Theodor, King (c.710–730)
- Constantine II, King (c.730–745)
- Leon I, King (c.745–767)
- Leon II, King (c.767–811)

- Arminiya (complete list) –

- Muhammad ibn Marwan, Emir (c.695–705)
- Abd al-Aziz ibn Hatim al-Bahili, Emir (706–709)
- Maslamah ibn Abd al-Malik, Emir (709–721)
- al-Djarrah ibn Abdallah al-Hakami, Emir (721–725)
- Maslamah ibn Abd al-Malik, Emir (725–729)
- al-Djarrah ibn Abdallah al-Hakami, Emir (729–730)
- Maslamah ibn Abd al-Malik, Emir (730–732)
- Marwan ibn Muhammad, Emir (732–733)
- Sa'id ibn Amr al-Harashi, Emir (733–735)
- Marwan ibn Muhammad, Emir (735–744)
- Ishaq ibn Muslim al-Uqayli, Emir (744–750)
- Abu Ja'far Abdallah ibn Muhammad, Emir (750–753)
- Yazid ibn Asid ibn Zafir al-Sulami, Emir (753–755)
- Sulayman, Emir (755–?)
- Salih ben Subai al-Kindi, Emir (c.767)
- Bakkar ibn Muslim al-Uqayli, Emir (c.769–770)
- al-Hasan ibn Qahtaba, Emir (770/771–773/774)
- Yazid ibn Asid ibn Zafir al-Sulami, Emir (773/774–778)
- Uthman ibn 'Umara ibn Khuraym, Emir (778–785)
- Khuzayma ibn Khazim, Emir (785–786)
- Yusuf ibn Rashid al-Sulami, Emir (786–787)
- Yazid ibn Mazyad al-Shaybani, Emir (787–788)
- Abd al-Qadir, Emir (788)
- Sulayman ibn Yazid, Emir (788–799)
- Yazid ibn Mazyad al-Shaybani, Emir (799–801)

- Gazikumukh Khanate (complete list) –

- Shakhbal ibn Abdullah, Shamkhal (c.740)

- Principality of Iberia (complete list) –

- Guaram III, Prince (c.693–c.748)
- Adarnase III, Prince (c.748–c.760)
- Nerse, Prince (c.760–772, 775–779/780)
- Stephen III, Prince (779/780–786)

- First Kingdom of Kakheti (complete list) –

- Stephanus II, Prince (685–736)
- Mihr, Prince (736–741)
- Archil “the Martyr”, Prince (736–786)
- Ioanne, Prince (786–790)
- Juansher, Prince (786–807)

== Oceania ==
Easter Island

- Easter Island (complete list) –

- Tuu Ka(u)nga te Mamaru, King (?)
- Takahita, King (?)
- Ouaraa, King (c.800)

== See also ==
- List of political entities in the 8th century
