= List of monarchs of Sussex =

The list of monarchs of the Anglo-Saxon kingdom of Sussex (or South Saxons) contains substantial gaps, as the chronological details relating to Sussex during the heptarchy is generally poorly documented. No authentic South Saxon king list or genealogy exists, unlike what can be found for other Anglo-Saxon kingdoms. Most kings are known only from Anglo-Saxon charters, some of which are forgeries, which makes it difficult to date the reigns of each king. The monarchs were either known as kings or ealdormen.

According to the charters, most kings did not govern alone: Nothhelm reigned with two or three colleagues and Oslac with four. The locations of the lands granted in their charters indicate that they reigned jointly and that there was no division of territory. Such joint reigns can also be demonstrated for the Hwicce, the East Saxons, and the West Saxons. Indeed, “[t]here is nothing remarkable in the existence of two or even more contemporary kings in the same people in the seventh century. The ancient idea that royal dignity was a matter of birth rather than of territorial rule still survived at this date.”

The traditional residence of the South Saxon kings was at Kingsham, once outside the southern walls of Chichester although within its modern boundaries.

== Kings and Ealdormen of the South Saxons ==
Reign	Incumbent	Style	Notes
477 – after 491	Ælle		First holder of imperium according to Bede. First bretwalda according to the Anglo-Saxon Chronicle, who gives the date of his landing in Sussex and battles against the Britons in 485 and 491.
after 491 ?	Cissa		Son of Ælle according to the Anglo-Saxon Chronicle. Legendary eponym of the town of Chichester.
There is no information on the kings of Sussex for more than a century and a half.
before 674 – c. 682	Æthelwealh		First Christian king of Sussex. Killed by Cædwalla of Wessex.
fl. c. 683?	?Eadric	Ealdulfus dux Suthsax	Listed according to William of Malmesbury. Possibly the same who reigned as king of Kent. Also appears as witness to a possibly spurious charter, S 232, of Cædwalla endowing Wilfrid's monastery at Selsey c.683. Probably represents Ealdwulf, who lived one century later.
fl. c. 683 – c. 685?	Ecgwald	Ecguald subregulus	Mentioned in possibly spurious charters, S 230 and S 232, of Cædwalla endowing Wilfrid's monastery at Selsey between c.683 to 685.
fl.685	Berthun and Andhun		According to Bede, these two ealdormen drove Cædwalla out of Sussex. Berthun was later killed by Cædwalla c.685.
fl.692 – after 714	Nothhelm (Nunna)	Nothelmus rex Suthsax’ Nunna rex Sussax’ Nunna rex Suthsax’	A kinsman of King Ine of Wessex.
fl.692 – c.700	Watt	Wattus rex	Attests charters of King Nothhelm.
fl. c.700	Bryni	Bruny dux Suthsax'	Ealdorman under Nothhelm and Watt.
fl. c.710	?Osric	Osricus	Unknown rank, may not have been king.
fl.714	Æthelstan	Athelstan rex	Attests charters of King Nothhelm.
fl. c.740	Æthelberht	Ethelbertus rex Sussaxonum	A contemporary of King Æthelbald of Mercia and Bishop Sigeferth.
Offa of Mercia gained control of Sussex in the early 770s.
fl.772	Oswald	Osuualdus dux Suðsax'	One of four South Saxon duces appearing on a charter of King Offa of Mercia (S 108). He may have been king at some point before that.
fl.760 – 772	Osmund	Osmundus rex Osmund dux	King in the 760s, maybe with Oslac, Ealdwulf and Ælfwald. One of four South Saxon duces appearing on a charter of King Offa of Mercia (S 108).
fl. c.765 to 780	Oslac	Osiac rex Oslac dux	King in the 760s with Ealdwulf and Ælfwald. One of four South Saxon duces appearing on a charter of King Offa of Mercia (S 108).
fl. c.765 – 772	Ælfwald	Ælhuuald rex Ælbuuald dux	King in the 760s with Oslac and Eadwulf. One of four South Saxon duces appearing on a charter of King Offa of Mercia (S 108).
fl. c.765 to c.791	Ealdwulf	Alduulf rex Aldwlfus dux Suthsaxonum; Aldwlf dux Aldwlfus dux Suthsaxonum; Ealdwlf	King in the 760s with Oslac and Ælfwald. Styled dux after 772.
Around 827 the South Saxons submitted to Egbert of Wessex.
died 982	Eadwine	Eaduuine dux	Ealdorman under Æthelred the Unready.

== See also ==
- List of monarchs of Wessex
- List of English monarchs
