= Eolla =

8th-century Bishop of Selsey

- Bishop of Selsey
- Appointed: 716 or 717
- Term ended: between 716 and 731
- Predecessor: Eadbeorht
- Successor: Sigga
- Other post: Abbot of Selsey

Personal details
- Died: between 716 and 731
- Denomination: Christian

Eolla, Bishop of Selsey, was the successor of Eadberht, and seems to have previously been Abbot of Selsey, as he witnessed a charter of Noðhelm together with Osric and Eadberht. He seems to have succeeded as bishop in either 716 or 717. His date of death is sometime between 716 and 731.

== Citations ==
Christian titles
Preceded by Eadbeorht	Bishop of Selsey flourished about 720	Succeeded by Sigga
