= Bryni of Sussex =

Bryni, Ealdorman of Sussex, issued an undated charter (but before about 705) as Bruny dux Suthsax’, that was witnessed by Kings Noðhelm and Watt.

Brinfast Farm near Sidlesham on the Manhood Peninsula, means Bryni's fortress. It is not known whether this refers to the same Bryni of Sussex.
