= Rape of Hastings =

Traditional territorial sub-division of the county of Sussex in England

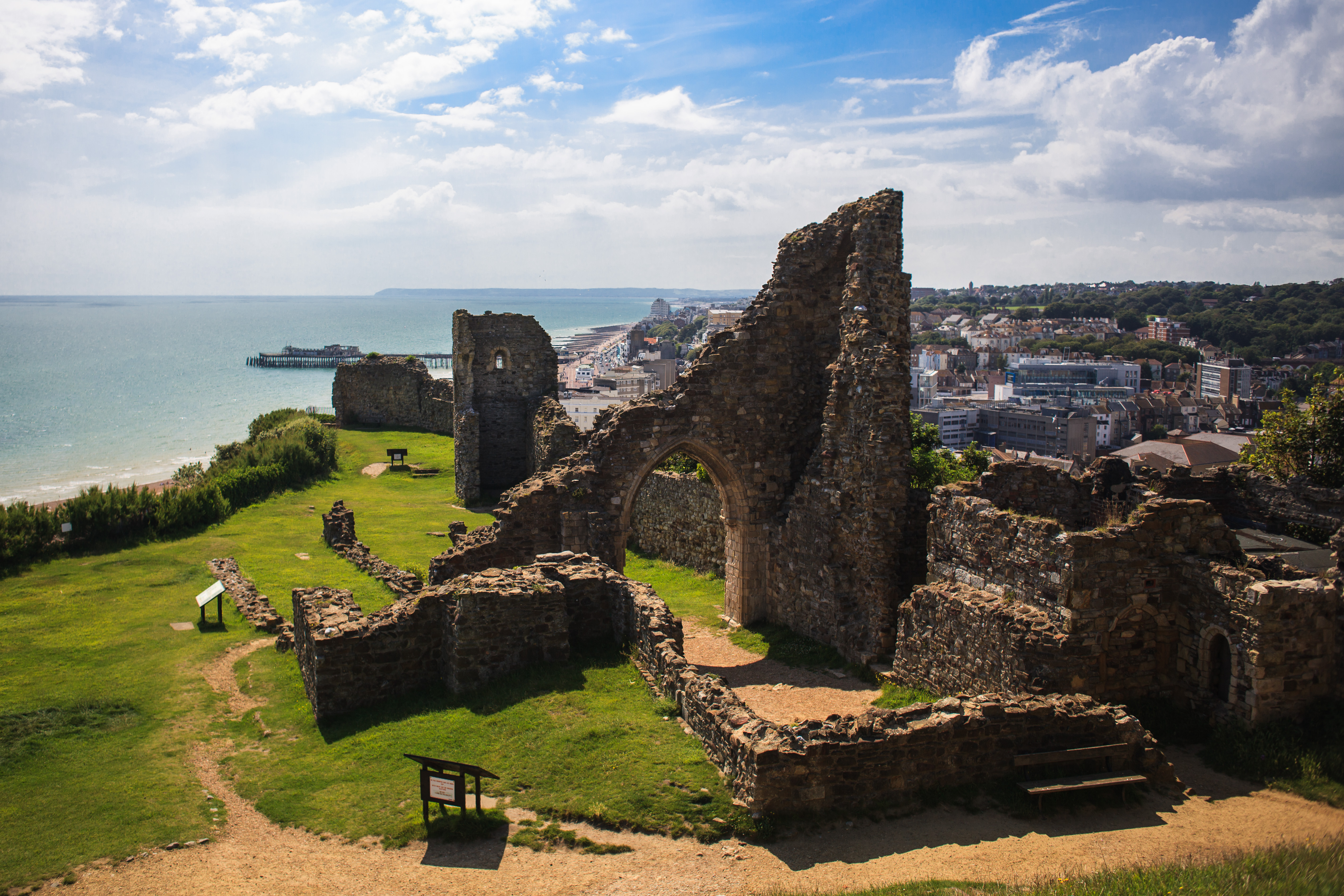
- Hastings Castle, once the administrative centre of the Rape

- The Rape of Hastings shown within Sussex
- Area
  - 1821: 154,069 acres (623.50 km^{2})
  - 1831: 154,069 acres (623.50 km^{2})
- Population
  - 1821: 44,311
  - 1831: 50,239
- Density
  - 1821: 0.29 inhabitants per acre (72/km^{2})
  - 1831: 0.33 inhabitants per acre (82/km^{2})
- History
  - Created: By 11th century
  - Succeeded by: Sussex (eastern division)
- Status: Rape (county subdivision)
  - HQ: Hastings
- Arms of the Rape and town of Hastings
- Subdivisions
  - Type: Hundreds
  - Units: Baldstrow, Battle, Bexhill, Foxearle, Gostrow, Guestling, Hawkesborough, Henhurst, Netherfield, Ninfield, Shoyswell, Staple

The Rape of Hastings (also known as Hastings Rape) is one of the rapes, the traditional sub-divisions unique to the historic county of Sussex in England.

== History ==
Rapes are territorial divisions, peculiar to Sussex, that were used for administrative purpose. The Rape of Hastings was one of six such divisions.

Medieval sources and place name evidence suggest that there were people living in what became the Rape of Hastings by the late 8th century. The people who were known as the Haestingas were a separate group to those of the South Saxons. The Haestingas became a sub-kingdom of the Kingdom of Sussex before being annexed by the Kingdom of Wessex.

William the Conqueror granted the rape of Hastings to his cousin, Robert, Count of Eu, shortly after the Norman Conquest.

== Location ==
Hastings rape is the easternmost of all the Sussex rapes and it borders the rape of Pevensey to the west. To the north and east of the rape lies the county of Kent, while to the south lies the English Channel. The rape of Hastings includes the towns of Battle, Hastings and Rye. At 197 metres (646 ft) tall, Brightling Down in the High Weald is the highest point in the rape.

== Sub-divisions ==
The rape is traditionally divided into the following hundreds:

- Baldstrow
- Battle
- Bexhill
- Foxearle
- Goldspur
- Gostrow
- Guestling
- Hawkesborough
- Henhurst
- Netherfield
- Ninfield
- Shoyswell
- Staple

== See also ==
- History of Sussex
- List of hundreds of England and Wales
