= Æthelbert of Sussex =

Æthelberht

King of Sussex
- Reign: 8th century
- Predecessor: Æthelstan of Sussex
- Successor: Osmund of Sussex
- House: List of monarchs of Sussex

Aethelbert (Old English: Æðelberht; fl. 8th century) was King of Sussex, but is known only from charters. The dates of Æðelberht's reign are unknown beyond the fact that it overlapped at least in part with the bishopric of Sigeferth of Selsey, as Sigeferth witnessed an undated charter of Æðelberht in which Æðelberht is styled Ethelbertus rex Sussaxonum.

Sigeferth, called Sicgga for short, was the 3rd Bishop of Selsey, consecrated in 733 by Archbishop Tatwine, and was still bishop in 747, when he attended the Synod of Clofesho. His date of death is unknown.

Another undated charter, in which Æðelberht is called Adelbertus rex Australium Saxonum (Æðelberht, King of the South Saxons), is believed to be a forgery.

Barker (1947) commented "This pair of charters have certain peculiar phrases, especially the firmiter ... præsumat which takes the place of a form introduced by Si quis in most charters. Both state that they were written by the king, and in No. X confixi is a very unusual word for this; it means literally 'pinned together', hence here 'put together' or 'compiled'. The early eighth century was age of enlightened kings: Ealdfrið and Eadberht of Northumbria and Ine of Wessex are examples. It is, therefore, possible that these two charters were in fact personally drawn up by the king." However, "confixi" is only in the forged charter.

Æðelberht is also mentioned in an undated endorsement to a charter of Noðhelm as Ethilberchto rege.

== See also ==
- Selsey Abbey
