= Eadberht of Selsey =

8th-century Bishop of Selsey

Eadberht
- Bishop of Selsey
- Appointed: between 709 and 716
- Term ended: between 716 and 731
- Predecessor: new foundation
- Successor: Eolla
- Other post: Abbot of Selsey

Orders
- Consecration: between 709 and 731

Personal details
- Died: between 716 and 731
- Denomination: Christian

Eadberht of Selsey (died circa 716) was an abbot of Selsey Abbey, later promoted to become the first Bishop of Selsey. He was consecrated sometime between 709 and 716, and died between 716 and 731. Wilfrid has occasionally been regarded as a previous bishop of the South Saxons, but this is an insertion of his name into the episcopal lists by later medieval writers, and Wilfrid was not considered the bishop during his lifetime or Bede's.

As abbot Eadberht received, around 700, a grant of land from Bryni, Ealdorman of Sussex, that was witnessed by Kings Nothelm of Sussex and Watt of Sussex.

In a charter dated by Birch about 725, Eadberht was named as the beneficiary of land from King Nothelm, witnessed by King Watt. But this charter is now believed to be a forgery from the late 10th century or early 11th century.

Eadberht also appears as a witness to an undated charter of Nothelm, together with Osric and Eolla. The charter can be approximately dated to some point between about 705 and 717. Eadberht last appearance is as a witness to a confirmation, dated 716, of a charter of Wihtred, King of Kent.

== Citations ==
Christian titles
| New title new foundation | Bishop of Selsey flourished around 715 | Succeeded by Eolla |
