= Haestingas =

Anglo-Saxon tribe

- c. AD 5th century – AD 711
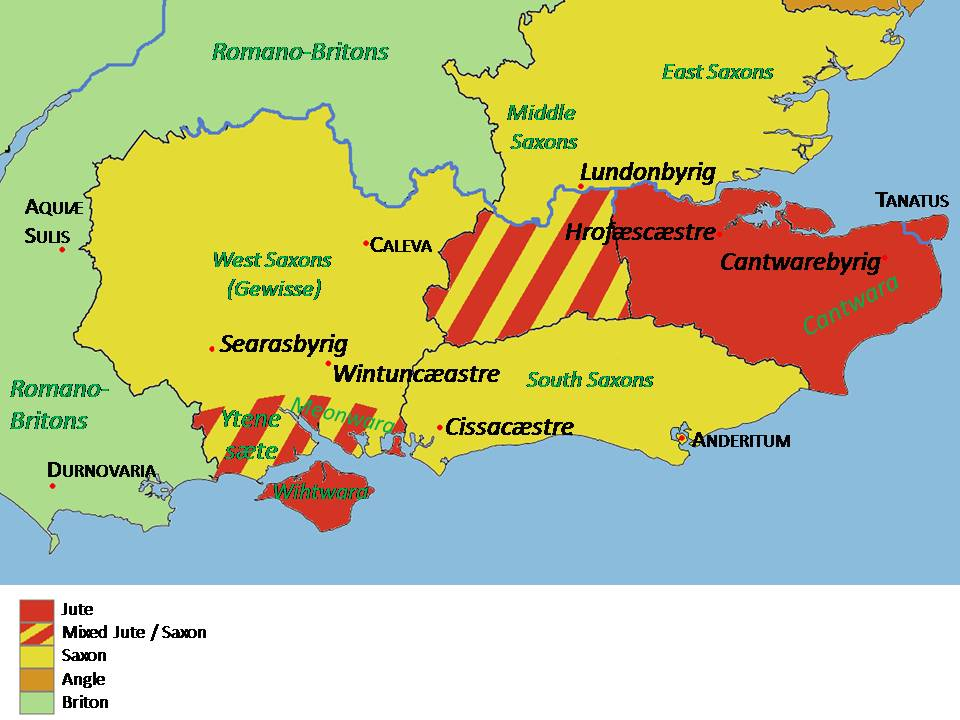
- The Anglo-Saxon settlements of south east Britain c. 572 AD
- Capital: Hastings
- Religion: Anglo-Saxon paganism, Anglo-Saxon Christianity
- Historical era: Anglo-Saxon
  - Established: c. AD 5th century
  - Conquest by Mercia: c. AD 711
Preceded by	Succeeded by
Western Roman Empire; Kingdom of Sussex	Mercia
- Today part of: United Kingdom

The Haestingas, Heastingas or Hæstingas were one of the tribes of Anglo-Saxon Britain. Not very much is known about them. They settled in what became East Sussex and its principal town of Hastings, which bears their name, sometime before the end of the 8th century. A 12th-century source suggested that they were conquered by Offa of Mercia, in 771. They were also recorded in the Anglo-Saxon Chronicle (ASC) as being an autonomous grouping as late as the 11th century.

== History ==
The foundation legend of the Kingdom of the South Saxons is given by the Anglo-Saxon Chronicle, which states that in the year AD 477 Ælle arrived at a place called Cymenshore in three ships with his three sons. (Note: ASC 477. English translation at Project Gutenberg. Accessdate 19 December 2012.) Traditionally Cymenshore is thought to have been located around the Selsey area, in the south west of Sussex. However the archaeological evidence indicates that the principal area of settlement in the 5th century, for the South Saxons, has been identified as between the lower Ouse and Cuckmere rivers in East Sussex, based on the number of Anglo-Saxon cemeteries there.

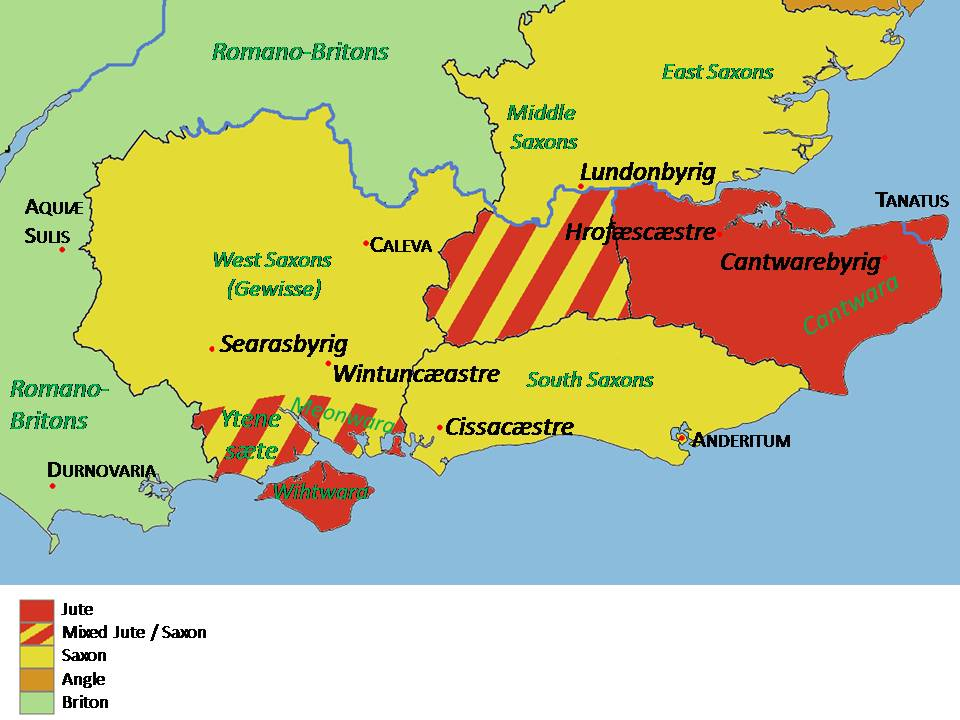
The Anglo-Saxon settlements of south east Britain c. 572 AD

To the east of Pevensey, beyond the Saxon Shore fort of Anderitum, on the other side of the estuary and marsh and from there to the border with the Kingdom of Kent, lived a group known as the Haestingas. They gave their name to Hastings. Not very much is known of the Haestingas but they were believed to be a separate people to the South Saxons; however, there is no archaeological evidence for occupation by Anglo-Saxons in that area of Sussex between the 5th and 8th centuries. Medieval sources and place name evidence suggest that people had begun living there by the late 8th century. Some of the Saxon charters that date from the Kingdom of Sussex provide evidence which suggests the existence of two separate dynasties in Sussex. The charters of King Northelm (or Nunna), who ruled Sussex in the late 7th and early 8th century regularly attest a second king by the name of Watt (or Wattus). The historian C.T. Chevalier has suggested that Watt may have ruled the Haestingas. This is because place-names with the name Watt or What occur in the Hastings region, but are not found in western Sussex. The theory has been seen as plausible by other historians. Chevalier goes on to suggest that the Haestingas may have been of Frankish origin; however, other historians have rejected this, arguing that it is based on a misinterpretation of place-name evidence.

Towards the end of the 8th century, Kent did not have a secure leadership and the kingdom of Wessex was pursuing an expansionist campaign under Cædwalla; the result was that Kent found itself being raided frequently by the West Saxons. The Anglo-Saxon Chronicle for 686 reported that Cædwalla ravaged Kent with his brother Mul. (Note: ASC 686. English translation at Project Gutenberg Accessdate 19 December 2012.) The following year it said that the people of Kent killed his brother Mul by "burning" him and that Cædwalla overran Kent (presumably in response to his brother's violent death). (Note: ASC 687. English translation at Project Gutenberg. Accessdate 19 December 2012.) In 688 Caedwalla went on a pilgrimage to Rome, why he did this is not reported but he died while he was there. (Note: ASC 688. English translation at Project Gutenberg. Accessdate 19 December 2012.) Stability was then returned to Kent under the new king Wihtred and also with Ine becoming king of Wessex. The people of Kent agreed to pay compensation (Weregild) to Wessex for the taking of Mul's life. (Note: ASC 694. English translation at Project Gutenberg. Accessdate 19 December 2012.) The agreement may have included some ceding of border territory, and it has been hypothesized that the overlordship of Haestingas would have been ceded to Ine as part of this treaty. The southern kingdoms lived in relative peace for the next quarter century.

The peace was shattered by the ascent of Mercian power; the chronicler Simeon of Durham records the defeat of the gens Hestingorum (the people of Hastings) by Offa of Mercia in 771. Mercian overlordship was ended when they were defeated in 825, by Egbert of Wessex, at the Battle of Ellandun. Egbert went on to annex the territories of Essex, Kent, Surrey and Sussex, suggesting that by this time the Haestingas had been subsumed into Sussex. (Note: ASC 1011. English translation at Project Gutenberg. Accessdate 19 December 2012.) However it is known that the Haestingas retained a distinct identity till the 11th century as the Anglo-Saxon Chronicle records the Haestingas as having been harried by the Danes in 1011.

The 19th century writer, Grant Allen argued that the Hastings region was predestined to be a separate region between the rest of Sussex and Kent, to later join with Sussex. Effectively isolated, the region was separated from the rest of Sussex and England by the marshland of the Pevensey Levels lying to the west and the forest of the Weald to the north, while Romney Marsh separates the region from Kent to the east. The kingdom of the Haestingas went on to join Sussex and become the rape of Hastings.

== Origins ==
It has been suggested that the Haestingas were of Frankish origin, based on Watt being a sub-king to the South Saxons and there being a place-name of Watten in northern France. However, the more probable explanation is that the Haestingas were Jutes who migrated from Kent. The Frankish princess Bertha had arrived in Kent around 580 to marry the king Æthelberht of Kent. Bertha was already a Christian and had brought a bishop, Liudhard, with her across the Channel. Kent was the earliest Anglo-Saxon kingdom to be evangelized and it would have been at this time the simplified Christian burial was introduced. As there is little archaeological evidence for the Haestingas, it is likely that they were already Christian when they moved to Sussex.

== Etymology ==
Haestingas is from Old English and means settlement of Haesta's People. Haesta would have been the chieftain or ruler and -ingas means People. It is possible that the founder may have been a forebear of the Viking leader Hastein (who invaded Kent in 892), but there is no evidence to support this hypothesis.

== See also ==
- Rape of Hastings
- History of Sussex
- Anglo-Saxon England
- Anglo-Saxon settlement of Britain

== Citations ==
- Allen, Grant (1882). Urban, Sylvanus (ed.). "An English Shire". Gentleman's Magazine. CCLII (January to June ed.). London: Chatto and Windus: 49–70.
- Armstrong, J.R. (1971). A History of Sussex. Sussex: Phillimore. ISBN 978-0-85033-185-1.
- Blair, John (2006). The Church in Anglo-Saxon Society. Oxford: OUP. ISBN 978-0-19-921117-3.
- Ayto, John; Crofton, Ian; Cavill, Paul (2005). Brewer's Britain and Ireland. London: Weidenfeld & Nicolson. ISBN 978-0-304-35385-9.
- Chevalier, C.T. (1966). Bedwin, Owen (ed.). "The Frankish origin of the Hastings tribe". Sussex Archaeological Collections. 104. Lewes, Sussex: Sussex Archaeological Society: 56–62. doi:10.5284/1085790.
- Coates, Richard (1979). Bedwin, Owen (ed.). "On the alleged Frankish origin of the Hastings tribe" (PDF). Sussex Archaeological Collections. 117. Lewes, Sussex: 263–264.
- Historyfiles (2012). "History Files". Whitstable, Kent: Kessler Associates.
- Hunter Blair, Peter (1963). Roman Britain and Early England 55BC-- AD871. London: W W Norton. ISBN 978-0-393-00361-1.
- of Durham, Simon (1855). Joseph Stevenson (ed.). The Church Historians of England. London: Seeleys.
- Gelling, Margaret (1985). Place-Names in the Landscape. London: Phoenix. ISBN 978-1-84212-264-8.
- Kelly, S.E (1998). Anglo-Saxon Charters VI: Charters of Selsey. OUP for the British Academy. ISBN 978-0-19-726175-0.
- Kirby, D.P. (2000). The Earliest English Kings. Revised Ed. London: Routledge. ISBN 978-0-415-24211-0.
- Welch, Martin (1978). "Early Anglo-Saxon Sussex". In Brandon, Peter (ed.). The South Saxons. Chichester: Phillimore. ISBN 978-0-85033-240-7.
- Yorke, Barbara (1990). Kings and Kingdoms of Early Anglo-Saxon England. London: Seaby. ISBN 978-1-85264-027-9.
