= Heptarchy =

Seven kingdoms of Anglo-Saxon England

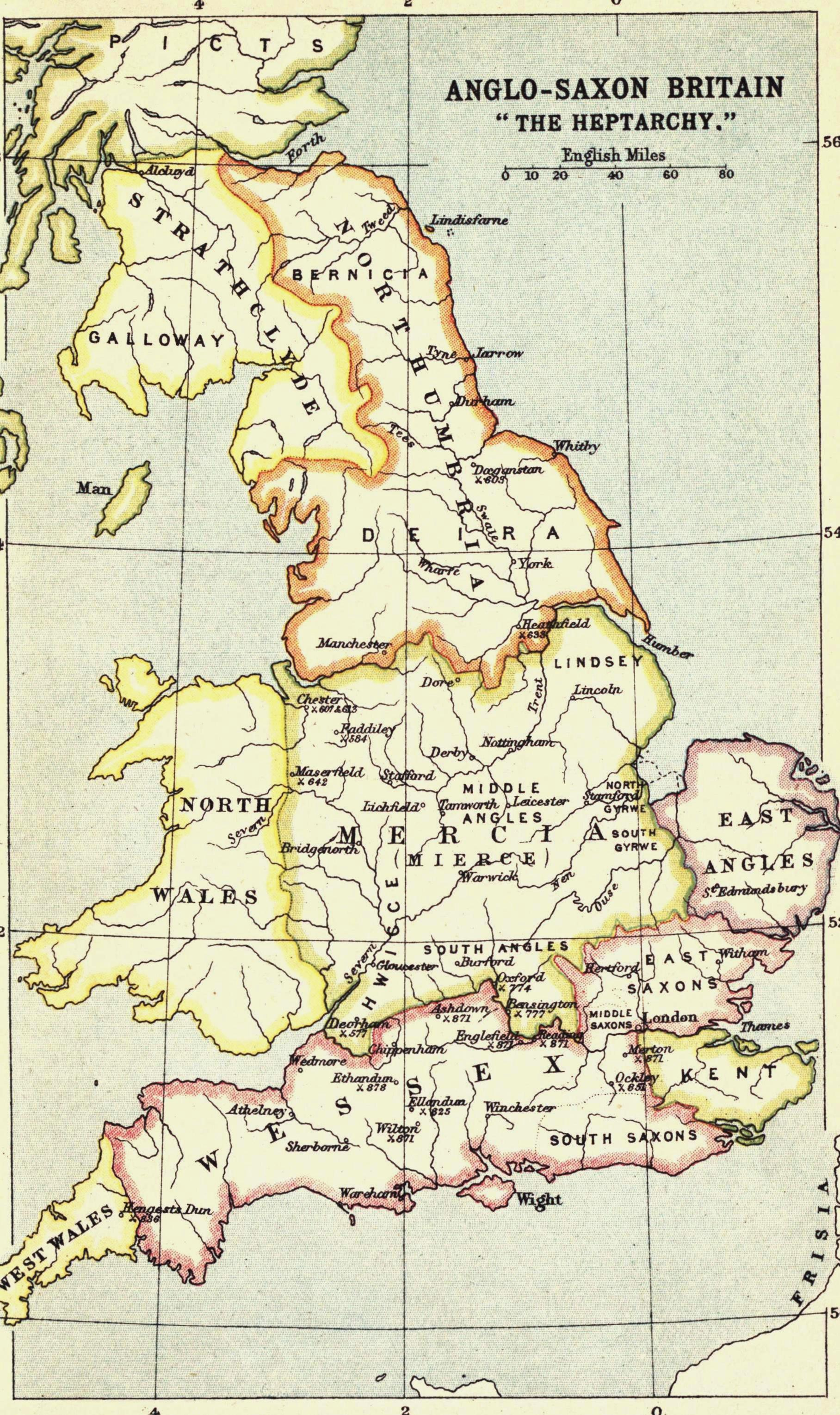
The penultimate set of Anglo-Saxon kingdoms was fivefold. The map annotates the names of the peoples of Essex and Sussex taken into the Kingdom of Wessex, which later took in the Kingdom of Kent and became the senior dynasty, and the outlier kingdoms. From Bartholomew's A literary & historical atlas of Europe (1914)

The Heptarchy was the division of Anglo-Saxon England between the sixth and eighth centuries into petty kingdoms, conventionally the seven kingdoms of East Anglia, Essex, Kent, Mercia, Northumbria, Sussex, and Wessex. The term originated with the twelfth-century historian Henry of Huntingdon and has been widely used ever since, but it has been questioned by historians as the number of kingdoms fluctuated, and there was never a time when the territory of the Anglo-Saxons was divided into seven kingdoms, each ruled by one king. The period of petty kingdoms came to an end in the eighth century, when England was divided into the four dominant kingdoms of East Anglia, Mercia, Northumbria, and Wessex.

== History ==
The main Anglo-Saxon kingdoms' names are written in red

Although heptarchy suggests the existence of seven kingdoms (hepta being Greek for 'seven'), the term is just used as a label of convenience and does not imply the existence of a clear-cut or stable group of seven kingdoms. The number of kingdoms and sub-kingdoms fluctuated rapidly during this period as competing kings contended for supremacy.

In the late 6th century, the king of Kent was a prominent lord in the south. In the 7th century, the rulers of Northumbria and Wessex were powerful. In the 8th century, Mercia achieved hegemony over the other surviving kingdoms, particularly during the reign of Offa the Great.

Alongside the seven kingdoms, a number of other political divisions also existed, such as the kingdoms (or sub-kingdoms) of: Bernicia and Deira within Northumbria; Lindsey in present-day Lincolnshire; the Hwicce in the southwest Midlands; the Magonsæte or Magonset, a sub-kingdom of Mercia in what is now Herefordshire; the Wihtwara, a Jutish kingdom on the Isle of Wight, originally as important as the Cantwara of Kent; the Middle Angles, a group of tribes based around modern Leicestershire, later conquered by the Mercians; the Hæstingas (around the town of Hastings in Sussex); and the Gewisse.

== List of Anglo-Saxon kingdoms ==
The four main kingdoms in Anglo-Saxon England were:

- East Anglia
- Mercia
- Northumbria, including sub-kingdoms Bernicia and Deira
- Wessex

The other main kingdoms, which were conquered and absorbed by others entirely at some point in their history, before the unification of England, are:

- Essex
- Kent
- Sussex

Other minor kingdoms and territories:

- Bernicia
- Deira
- Haestingas
- The Hwicce
- Kingdom of the Iclingas, a precursor state to Mercia
- Lindsey
- Magonsæte
- The Meonwara, a Jutish tribe in Hampshire
- Middle Angles
- Middle Saxons (Middlesex, subsequently absorbed by the Kingdom of Essex)
- Pecsæte
- Surrey
- Tomsæte
- Wreocensæte
- Wihtwara

== Chart of the Seven Kingdoms of the Heptarchy ==
Comparative reigns of the seven kingdoms of the Heptarchy

Wikimedia Link - https://commons.wikimedia.org/wiki/File:Heptarchy_v2.pdf

== See also ==
- History of Anglo-Saxon England
- Related terms: Bretwalda, High King for hegemons among kings
- Compare: Tetrarchy
- Five Burghs

== Bibliography ==
- Westermann Großer Atlas zur Weltgeschichte
- Campbell, James; John, Eric; Wormald, Patrick (6 August 1991). The Anglo-Saxons. Penguin. ISBN 978-0-14-014395-9.
- Sawyer, Peter H. (11 September 2002). From Roman Britain to Norman England. Routledge. ISBN 978-1-134-68246-1.
- Stenton, F. M. Anglo-Saxon England (3rd edition. Oxford U. P. 1971).
