= Eadwine of Sussex =

Anglo-Saxon ruler (died 982)

Eadwine was an Ealdorman of Sussex. His death was recorded in 982 and he was buried at Abingdon Abbey in Berkshire, where one version of the Anglo-Saxon Chronicle was compiled. According to the abbey's records, in which he was called princeps Australium Saxonum, Eadwinus nomine, he bequeathed estates to them in his will, although the document itself has not survived. Earlier in the same year he witnessed a charter of King Æðelræd Unræd as Eaduuine dux. His name was also added to a forged charter dated 956 (possibly an error for 976).
