= Oswald of Sussex =

Anglo-Saxon Ealdorman

Oswald was an Ealdorman of Sussex, jointly with three former kings: Osmund, Ælfwald, and Oslac.

He witnessed a charter of Offa, King of Mercia, dated 772 as Osuualdus dux Suðsax'. He was listed ahead of the three former kings Osmund, Ælfwald, and Oslac, which implies that his rank was higher. It is probable that all four were former Kings of Sussex, demoted after Offa's conquest. However, this is mere speculation; there is no actual evidence that Oswald ever reigned as king.

Oswald is not known to have issued charters of his own.
