= Kingdom of Sussex =

Early English kingdom

Kingdom of the South Saxons Old English: Sūþseaxna rīċe Latin: Regnum Sussaxonum
- c. 477–860
- Britain around AD 800
- Status: Independent kingdom (477–686, 715–771, 796–827); Client state of Wessex (686–715, 827–860); Client state of Mercia (771–796)
- Official languages: West Saxon Old English
- Religion: Anglo-Saxon paganism (before 7th century); Chalcedonian Christianity (after 7th century)
- Government: Monarchy
- Monarchs (see full list)
  - 477–491 or later: Ælle
  - fl. c. 660 – c. 685: Æðelwealh
- Legislature: Witenagemot
- Historical era: Heptarchy
  - Established: c. 477 (Note: The traditional year given for the creation of the Kingdom of Sussex from Bede is 477; many academics think the date was probably about 20 years earlier, c. 457.)
  - Subject to Wessex: c. 686 – c. 715
  - Subject to Mercia: 771 to c. 796
  - Subject to Wessex: From c. 827
  - Full integration into crown of Wessex: 860

Population
  - 450: 25,000
  - 1100: 35,000
- Currency: Sceat
Preceded by	Succeeded by
Sub-Roman Britain; Kingdom of Haestingas	Wessex
- Today part of: United Kingdom

The Kingdom of the South Saxons, today referred to as the Kingdom of Sussex, (Note: /ˈsʌsɪks/; from Middle English: Suth-sæxe, in turn from Old English: Suth-Seaxe or Sūþseaxna rīce, meaning "(land or people of/Kingdom of) the South Saxons") was an early medieval English kingdom, constituting one of the seven traditional kingdoms of Anglo-Saxon England. On the south coast of the island of Great Britain, it was originally a sixth-century Saxon colony and later an independent kingdom. The kingdom remains one of the least known of the Anglo-Saxon polities, with no surviving king-list, several local rulers and less centralisation than other Anglo-Saxon kingdoms. The South Saxons were ruled by the kings of Sussex until the country was annexed by Wessex, probably in 827, in the aftermath of the Battle of Ellendun. In 860 Sussex was ruled by the kings of Wessex, and by 927 all remaining Anglo-Saxon kingdoms were ruled by them as part of the new kingdom of England.

The foundation legend of the kingdom of Sussex is that in 477 Ælle and his three sons arrived in three ships, conquering what is now Sussex. Ælle became overlord, or Bretwalda, over the other Anglo-Saxon kingdoms south of the Humber. Historians are divided over whether or not Ælle really existed; however archaeological evidence supports the view that a short-lived expansion of South Saxon authority as far as the Midlands may have taken place in the 5th century.

For much of the 7th and 8th centuries, Sussex suffered invasion attempts by the kingdom of Wessex to its west. King Æðelwealh formed an alliance with Christian Mercia against Wessex, becoming Sussex's first Christian king. With support from St Wilfrid, Sussex became the last major Anglo-Saxon kingdom to become Christian. South Saxon and Mercian forces took control of what are now east Hampshire and the Isle of Wight. Cædwalla of Wessex killed Æðelwealh and "ravaged Sussex by fierce slaughter and devastation". The South Saxons forced Cædwalla from Sussex and were able to lead a campaign into Kent, replacing its king. At that time Sussex could have re-emerged into a regional power. Shortly afterwards, Cædwalla returned to Sussex, killing its king and putting its people into what Bede called "a worse state of slavery". The South Saxon clergy were put under the control of West Saxon Winchester. Only around 715 was Eadberht of Selsey made the first bishop of the South Saxons, after which further invasion attempts from Wessex ensued.

Following a period of rule by King Offa of Mercia, Sussex regained its independence but was annexed by Wessex around 827 and was fully absorbed into the kingdom of Wessex in 860.

== Geography ==
The Kingdom of Sussex had its initial focus in a territory based on the former kingdom and Romano-British civitas of the Regni and its boundaries coincided in general with those of the later county of Sussex. For a brief period in the 7th century, the Kingdom of Sussex controlled the Isle of Wight and the territory of the Meonwara in the Meon Valley in east Hampshire. From the late 8th century, Sussex seems to have absorbed the Kingdom of the Haestingas, after the region was conquered by the Mercian king Offa.

A large part of its territory was covered by the forest that took its name from the fort of Anderitum at modern Pevensey, and known to the Romano-British as the Forest of Andred and to the Saxons as Andredsleah or Andredsweald, known today as the Weald. This forest, according to the Anglo-Saxon Chronicle, was 120 miles (190 km) wide and 30 miles (50 km) deep (although probably closer to 90 miles (140 km) wide). It was the largest remaining area of woodland and heath in the territories that became England and was inhabited by wolves, boars and possibly bears. It was so dense that Domesday Book did not record some of its settlements. (Note: Whether a place-name was recorded in Domesday Book did not depend on geography alone. Regarding the Weald in particular, "[t]he reason lay in the peculiar economy of the region.") The heavily forested Weald made expansion difficult but also provided some protection from invasion by neighbouring kingdoms. While Sussex's isolation from the rest of Anglo-Saxon England has been emphasised, Roman roads must have remained important communication arteries across the forest of the Weald. The Weald was not the only area of Sussex that was forested in Saxon times—for example, at the western end of Sussex is the Manhood Peninsula, which in the modern era is largely deforested, but the name is probably derived from the Old English maene-wudu meaning "men's wood" or "common wood" indicating that it was once woodland.

The coastline would have looked different from today. Much of the alluvium in the river plains had not yet been deposited and the tidal river estuaries extended much further inland. It is estimated that the coastal plain may have been at least one mile broader than it is today. Before people reclaimed the tidal marshes in the 13th century the coastal plain contained extensive areas of sea water in the form of lagoons, salt marsh, wide inlets, islands and peninsulas. To the South Saxons of the 5th and 6th centuries this coastline must have resembled their original homeland between coastal Friesland, Lower Saxony and Schleswig-Holstein.

The landscape gave rise to some key regional differences within the kingdom. The rich coastal plain continued to be the base for the large estates, ruled by their thegns, some of whom had their boundaries confirmed by charters. The Downs were more deserted. South Saxon impact was greatest in the Weald. Along the north scarp of the Downs runs a series of parishes with land evenly distributed across the different soils to their northern boundaries; the parishes were more or less equal in area, around 4,000 acres (1,600 hectares). In the early mediaeval period, the rivers of Sussex may have acted locally as a major unifier, linking coastal, estuary and riverside communities and providing people in these areas with a sense of identity.

The boundaries of the Kingdom of Sussex probably crystallised around the 6th and 7th centuries. The Domesday Book lists four Mardens on the East Hampshire/ West Sussex border. The Old English for Marden would have been Maere-dun meaning "boundary down", reflecting their position. A tributary of the River Ems rises south of Stoughton and travels north to North Marden, completing the western boundary of the South Saxons. Bede described the western boundary with the Kingdom of Wessex as being opposite the Isle of Wight. (Note: It is possible that the Jutish territories of the Isle of Wight and the Meon Valley in modern Hampshire acted as a buffer zone between the Saxon kingdoms of Sussex and Wessex until they were conquered by the Mercian king Wulfhere and passed to King Aethelwealh of Sussex in the 7th century.) To the east at Romney Marsh and the River Limen (now called the River Rother or Kent Ditch), Sussex shared a border with the Kingdom of Kent. North of the Forest Ridge in the Wealden forest lay the sub-kingdom of Surrey, which became a frontier area disputed by various kingdoms until it later became part of Wessex. To the south of Sussex lay the English Channel, beyond which lay Francia, or the Kingdom of the Franks.

By the 680s, when Christianity was being introduced, there is no doubt that the district around Selsey and Chichester had become the political centre of the kingdom, though there is little archaeological evidence for a reoccupation of Chichester itself before the 9th century. Ditchling may have been an important regional centre for a large part of central Sussex between the Rivers Adur and Ouse until the founding of Lewes in the 9th century. By the 11th century the towns were mostly developments of the fortified towns (burhs) founded in the reign of Alfred the Great.

The ancient droveways of Sussex linked coastal and downland communities in the south with summer pasture land in the interior of the Weald. The droveways were used throughout the Saxon era by the South Saxons and probably originated before the Roman occupation of Britain. The droveways formed a road system that clearly suggests that the settlers in the oldest developed parts of Sussex were concerned not so much with east–west connections between neighbouring settlements as with north–south communication between each settlement and its outlying woodland pasture. The droving roads had an enduring effect on the pattern of Sussex settlement. When churches came to be built, an ideal site was where a drove crossed a river. Eventually traders gravitated to churches, founding villages, and in some cases market towns such as Ditchling, Shermanbury, Thakeham, Ashurst and Shipley. Different names existed for the swine pastures in different parts of Sussex. In the territory of the Haestingas in the east, swine pastures were named denns, in the centre they were referred to as "styes" (stig) and in the west, folds. These places grew from being sheds for animals and temporary huts for swineherders, to permanent farms, water-mills, churches and market towns. Churches in the High Weald are mostly on isolated ridge-top sites, away from the pioneer farms being established on the valley sides, as at Worth and Itchingfield to this day.

Land divisions in the Kingdom of Sussex were sometimes different from other Anglo-Saxon kingdoms and regions. By the Late Saxon period, the main administrative unit of Sussex was the district known as the rape. Their origins may be earlier, possibly originating in the Romano-British period. The rapes were sub-divided into hundreds, which served as taxation and administrative districts. In England generally these contained a nominal 100 hides (a measure of taxable value linked to land area) but in Sussex they were generally much smaller. Sussex may also have had eight virgates for every hide; in most of England a hide was usually made up of four virgates.

== Population ==
The population of Britain as a whole is likely to have declined sharply around the 4th century from around 2–4 million in AD 200 to less than 1 million in AD 300. There would have been a similarly sharp decline in the population of Sussex during this period. At the end of the 4th century there was a decline in the birth rate across Roman Britain; this population decrease would have been exacerbated by the transfer to Continental Europe of three large armies, recruited in Britain in the last 30 years of Roman rule, as well as plague and barbarian attack. Sussex's population around 450 is estimated to have been no more than about 25,000, rising gradually to around 35,000 by 1100. At the time of the Domesday Book in 1086, Sussex had some of the highest population densities in England.

Approximate populations of Sussex towns shortly after the end of the Saxon period in 1086 at the time of the Domesday Book may have been as follows:

Rank	Town	Population (1086 estimate)
1	Chichester	1,200–1,500
2	Lewes	1,200
3	Steyning	600
4	Pevensey	500

== History ==
=== Foundation story ===
The account of Ælle and his three sons landing at Cymenshore appears in the Anglo-Saxon Chronicle, a collection of seven vernacular manuscripts, commissioned in the 9th century, some 400 years or more after the events at Cymenshore. The account describes how on landing Ælle slew the local defenders and drove the remainder into the Forest of Andred. The Anglo-Saxon Chronicle goes on to describe Ælle's battle with the British in 485 near the bank of Mercredesburne, and his siege of the Saxon Shore fort at Andredadsceaster (modern day Pevensey) in 491 after which the inhabitants were massacred. (Note: ASC Parker MS. AD 485 and 491.)

The legendary foundation of Saxon Sussex, by Ælle, is likely to have originated in an oral tradition before being recorded in the Anglo-Saxon Chronicle. (Note: ASC 477 - Her cuom Ęlle on Bretenlond 7 his .iii. suna, Cymen 7 Wlencing 7 Cissa, mid .iii. scipum on þa stowe þe is nemned Cymenesora, 7 þær ofslogon monige Wealas 7 sume on fleame bedrifon on þone wudu þe is genemned Andredesleage.) (Note: The account marks the beginning of Saxon Sussex.) According to legend, various places took their names from Ælle's sons. Cissa is supposed to have given his name to Chichester, Cymen to Cymenshore and Wlencing to Lancing. Cymenshore is traditionally thought to have been located at what is now known as the Owers Rocks, south of Selsey, however there is no archaeological evidence to support the existence of Ælle and his three sons in the Selsey area. (Note: S. E. Kelly believes that The Owers is where Cymenshore is, she gives the alternate spellings as Cumeneshore, Cumenshore, Cimeneres horan, Cymeneres horan)

From 491 until the arrival of Christianity in the 7th century, there was a dearth of contemporary written material.Because of the lack of written history before the 7th century it has made it difficult for historians to produce a definitive story. The preservation of Ælle's sons in Old English place names is unusual. The names of the founders, in other origin legends, seem to have British and/ or Latin roots not Old English. It is likely that the foundation stories were known before the 9th century, but the annalists manipulated them to provide a common origin for the new regime. These myths proport that the British were defeated and replaced by invading Anglo-Saxons arriving in small ships. These origin stories were largely believed right up to the 19th century.

=== Early period (c. 450 – 600) ===
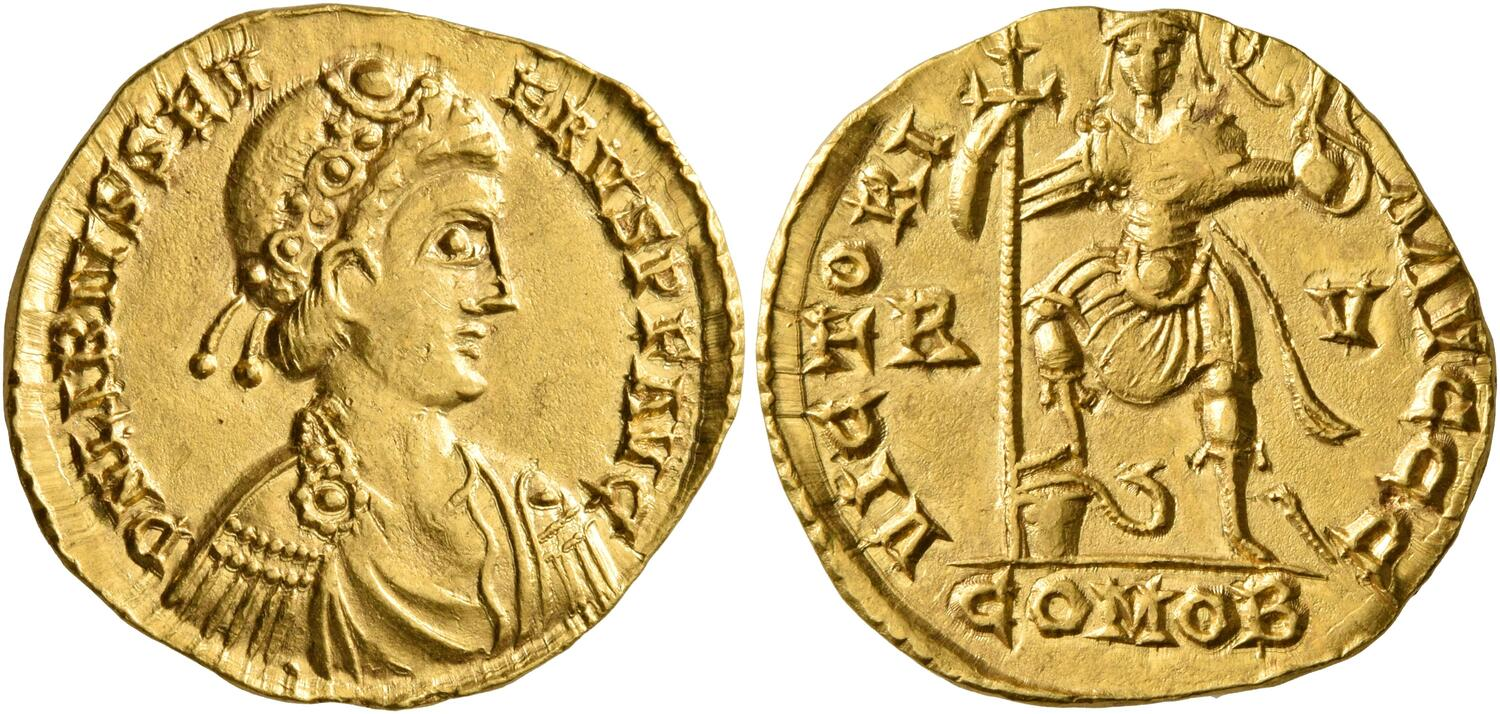
A coin from the Patching Hoard was a gold solidus struck in the name of Severus III

Archaeology gives a different settlement picture to that indicated by the South Saxon foundation story. Germanic tribes probably first arrived in Sussex earlier in the 5th century than 477. The archaeological evidence that we do have indicates the area of settlement by the location of cemeteries of the period. The origins of the settlers can be derived by comparing the design of grave goods and pottery with the designs of similar items in the German homelands. The principal area of settlement in the 5th century has been identified as between the lower Ouse and Cuckmere rivers in East Sussex, based on the number of Anglo-Saxon cemeteries there. However, there are two cemeteries in West Sussex at Highdown, near Worthing and Apple Down, 11 km (7 mi.) northwest of Chichester. (Note: At Appledown 282 cremations and inhumations were recorded.) The area between the Ouse and Cuckmere was believed to have been the location for the federate treaty settlement of Anglo-Saxon mercenaries. Whatever the original settlement pattern of the early Germanic settlers, their culture came to rapidly dominate the whole of Sussex.

There is some evidence to support the treaty hypothesis, based on the grave finds of the period. For example, the excavation of one of the cemeteries, at Rookery Hill at Bishopstone, East Sussex, yielded late Roman or insular Roman metalwork including a Quoit Brooch Style buckle, which would indicate settlement here to the early 5th century. Subsequent excavations revealed a considerable area of Saxon buildings. Of the 22 buildings excavated, three were sunken huts, 17 are rectangular founded on individual post holes, one is represented by post holes between which are beam slots, and one by eight single large posts.

Highdown is the only 5th-century Saxon cemetery found outside the Ouse/Cuckmere area, and is 2 km from a hoard of Roman gold and silver that was found in 1997. The Patching hoard, as it came to be known, contained a coin as recent as 470. (Note: The coin was a gold solidus struck in the name of Severus III. These coins were also minted after Severus's death so the coin from Patching is dated in the range of 461-470 rather than to the actual reign of Severus.) Thus, Highdown cemetery would have been in use by Saxons when the hoard was buried at Patching. The settlement that used Highdown as a burial ground in the 5th century has never been identified, but White speculates that there may have been some link between Patching and Highdown, and Welch has suggested that a Romano-British community was based there and that they controlled a group of Saxon mercenaries.

Despite the difficulties presented by the large forest tract of the Weald that separated Sussex from Surrey, similarities in the archaeological record from this period between Sussex and Surrey help to substantiate the claim of Ælle of Sussex to be the first Bretwalda in the Thames Valley. Such unified regional commands were probably not long-lasting. J. N. L. Myres posits that archaeological evidence, in the form of distinctive Saxon saucer brooches, suggests that Ælle's forces penetrated north as far as modern day Oxfordshire and Gloucestershire to the west. H. R. Loyn suggests that this initial regional hegemony may have ended after the Battle of Mount Badon.

=== Christianisation and loss of independence (600–860) ===
After 491 the written history of Sussex goes blank until 607, when the annals report that Ceolwulf of Wessex fought against the South Saxons. Threatened by Wessex, the South Saxons sought to secure their independence by alliance with Mercia. To the South Saxons, the more distant influence and control of a king from Mercia is likely to have been preferable to that of the West Saxons. The alliance between Mercia and the South Saxons was further sealed by Æðelwealh, king of Sussex, receiving baptism into the Christian church through the Mercian court, with Wulfhere acting as his sponsor, making Æðelwealh Sussex's first Christian king. Wulfhere gave Æðelwealh the Isle of Wight and the territory of the Meonwara (the Meon valley of present-day Hampshire). Æðelwealh also married Eabe, a princess of the Hwicce, a Mercian satellite province.

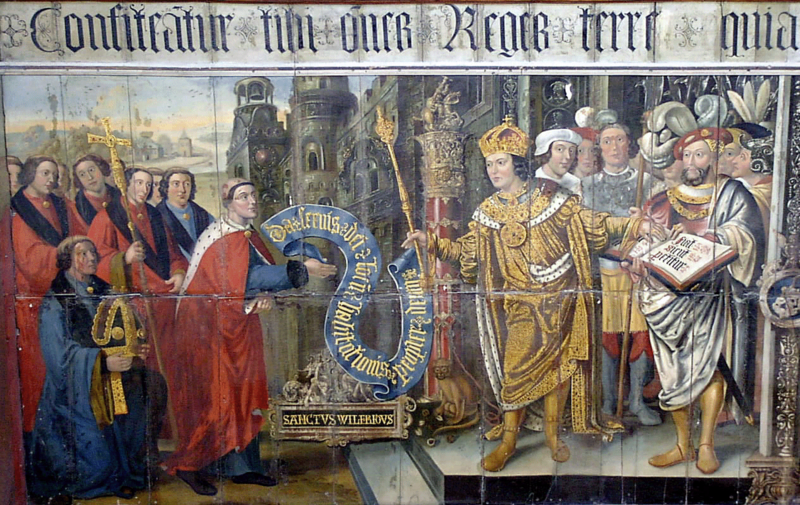
16th-century Barnardi picture of Cædwalla granting lands to Wilfrid.

In 681, the exiled St Wilfrid of Northumbria arrived in the kingdom of the South Saxons and remained there for five years evangelising (Note: An hypothesis, posited by some modern academics has suggested that it is possible that the people of Sussex were already members of the British church (Insular Christians). Because Wilfrid and his followers did not like the British church his biographer Stephen of Ripon would have suppressed this knowledge in the "Life of Wilfrid". Also for similar reasons Bede would have excluded this from his "History".) and baptising the people. There had been a famine in the land of the South Saxons when Wilfrid arrived. Wilfrid taught the locals to fish, and they were impressed with Wilfrid's teachings and agreed to be baptised en masse. On the day of the baptisms the rain fell on the "thirsty earth", so ending the famine. Æðelwealh gave 87 hides (an area of land) and a royal vill to Wilfrid to enable him to found Selsey Abbey. The abbey eventually became the seat of the South Saxon bishopric, where it remained until after the Norman Conquest, when it was moved to Chichester by decree of the Council of London of 1075.

Shortly after the arrival of St Wilfrid, the kingdom was ravaged with "fierce slaughter and devastation" and Æðelwealh was slain by an exiled West Saxon prince Cædwalla. The latter was eventually expelled, by Æðelwealh's successors, two Ealdormen named Berhthun and Andhun. In 686 the South Saxons attacked Hlothhere, king of Kent, in support of his nephew Eadric, who afterwards became king of Kent. At this time, a new South Saxon hegemony extending from the Isle of Wight into Kent could conceivably have seen Sussex re-emerge as a regional power but the revival of Wessex ended this possibility. Eadric's rule in Kent lasted until Kent was invaded by Cædwalla who had managed to establish himself as ruler of Wessex. With his additional resources, Cædwalla once more invaded Sussex, killing Berhthun. Sussex now became for some years subject to a period of harsh West Saxon domination. According to Bede, the subjection reduced the kingdom of Sussex to "a worse state of slavery"; it also included placing the South Saxon clergy under the authority of Wessex through the bishops of Winchester. Cædwalla also seized the Isle of Wight where he ruthlessly exterminated its population, including its royal line. According to David Dumville, Cædwalla's savage behaviour towards Sussex and the Isle of Wight can be explained by Sussex's westward expansion with assistance from Mercia at the expense of Wessex and Cædwalla was determined that this should never happen again.

Of the later South Saxon kings we have little knowledge except from occasional charters. In 692 a grant is made by a king called Noðhelm (or Nunna) to his sister, which is witnessed by another king called Watt. There is a theory that Watt may have been a sub-king who ruled over a tribe of people centred around modern day Hastings, known as the Haestingas and Nunna is described, in the Anglo-Saxon Chronicle, as the kinsman of Ine of Wessex who fought with him against Geraint, King of the Britons, in 710. According to Bede, Sussex was subject to Ine for a number of years and like Cædwalla, Ine also oppressed the people of Sussex in the same harsh way for many years.

In 710 Sussex was still under West Saxon domination when King Nothhelm of Sussex is recorded as having campaigned with Ine in the west against Dumnonia. Sussex evidently broke away from West Saxon domination some time before 722 when Ine is recorded as invading Sussex, which he repeated three years later, killing a West Saxon exile named Ealdberht who had fled to the Weald of Sussex and Surrey and appears to have attempted to find support in Sussex. The Anglo Saxon Chronicle records a further campaign against the South Saxons by the West Saxons in 725.

According to a charter dated 775, the former abbot of Selsey, Bishop Eadberht of Selsey (c. 705 x?709) – (716 x?), was given a grant of land by King Nunna; the document included King Watt as a witness. However, the charter is now believed to have been a 10th- or early-11th-century forgery.

There is another charter, that is thought to be genuine, that records a series of transactions of a piece of land near modern-day Burpham in the Arun Valley. It starts off with a grant of land, at Peppering, by Nunna to Berhfrith probably for the foundation of a minster. Berhfrith transferred the land to Eolla, who in turn sold it to Wulfhere. The land then went to Beoba who passed it on to Beorra and Ecca. Finally King Osmund bought the land from his comes Erra and granted it to a religious woman known as Tidburgh. The charter is undated but it has been possible to date the various transactions approximately, by cross referencing people who appear both on this charter and on other charters that do provide dates. On the transaction, where Eolla has acquired the land from Berhfrith and sells it to Wulfhere [c. 705 x (716x?)], Nunna's subscription is followed by a certain Osric who was possibly Nunna's co-ruler. The other witnesses who followed Osric were Eadberht and Eolla, both who can be identified as ecclesiastics.

Nunna's last surviving charter, which is dated 714 in error for 717, is witnessed by a King Æðelstan.

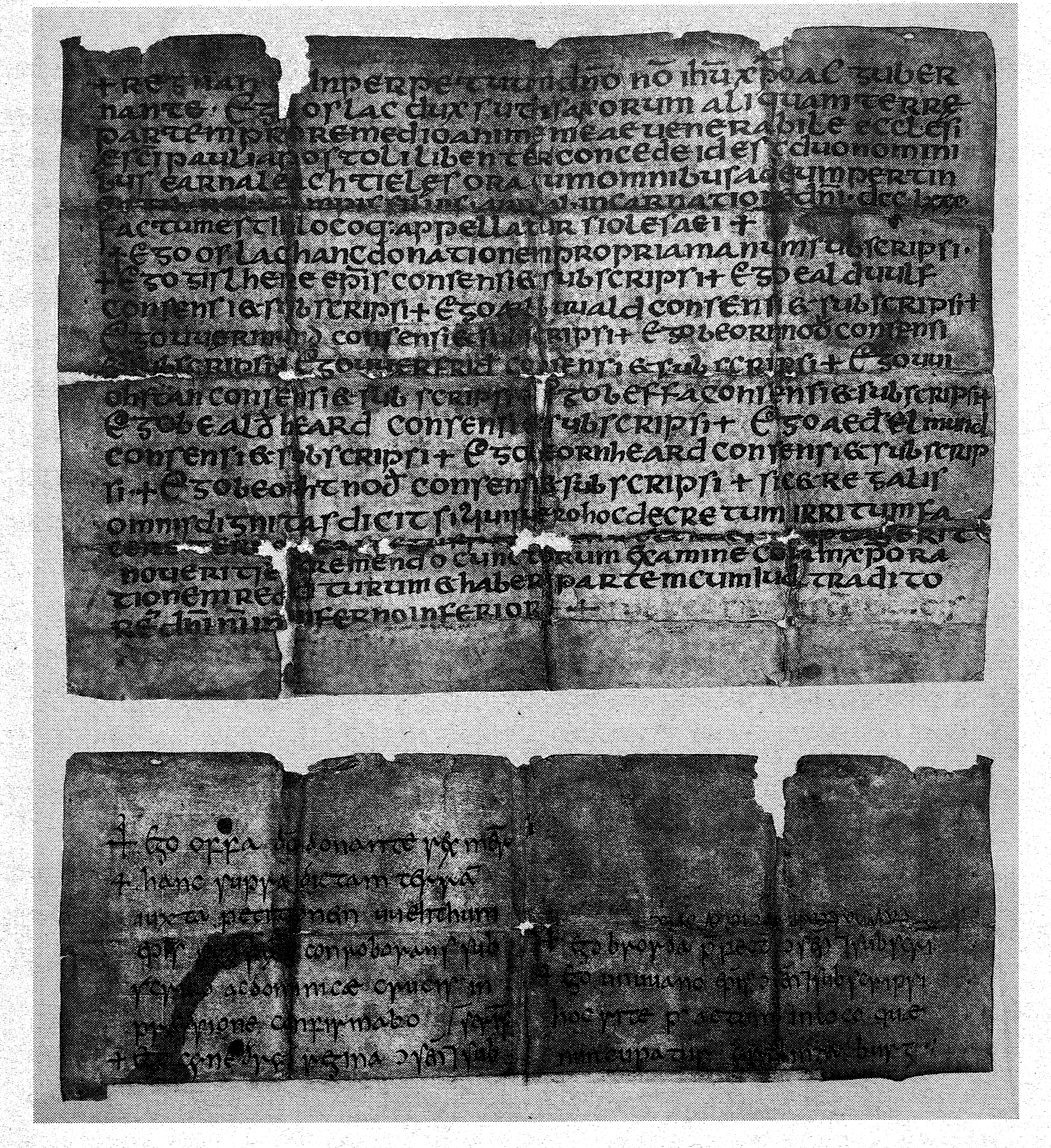
Charter S 1184 dated 780 of Oslac, ealdorman of the South Saxons, granting land to the Church of St Paul (Selsey Cathedral). Below is an endorsement of the charter by King Offa dated between 789 and 796.

A little later, Æðelberht was King of Sussex, but he is known only from charters. The dates of Æðelberht's reign are unknown beyond the fact that he was a contemporary of Sigeferth, Bishop of Selsey from 733, as Sigeferth witnessed an undated charter of Æðelberht in which Æðelberht is styled Ethelbertus rex Sussaxonum.

After this we hear nothing more until about 765, when a grant of land is made by a king named Ealdwulf, with two other kings, Ælfwald and Oslac, as witnesses.

In 765 and 770 grants are made by a King Osmund, the latter one was later confirmed by Offa of Mercia.

The independent existence of the Kingdom of Sussex came to an end in the early 770s. In 771, King Offa of Mercia conquered the territory of the Haestingas; he may have entered Sussex from the Kingdom of Kent, where he was already dominant. By 772 he apparently controlled the whole of the Kingdom of Sussex. The Mercians controlled Sussex until they were defeated in the Battle of Ellendun in 825 by King Ecgberht of Wessex, and Sussex passed under West Saxon control. According to Heather Edwards in the Oxford Dictionary of National Biography, it is probable that Sussex was not annexed by Wessex until 827. Control of Sussex seems later to have been sometimes combined with that of Kent. Æthelberht of Wessex was ruling Sussex and the other south-eastern kingdoms by 855, and succeeded to the kingship of Wessex on the death of his brother, King Æthelbald, thus bringing Sussex fully under the crown of Wessex.

=== Ealdormanry and shire (860–1066) ===
From 895 Sussex suffered from constant raids by the Danes, until the accession of Canute, after which arose the two great forces of the house of Godwine and of the Normans. Godwine was probably a native of Sussex, and by the end of Edward the Confessor's reign a third part of the county was in the hands of his family.

The death of Eadwine, Ealdorman of Sussex, is recorded in 982, because he was buried at Abingdon Abbey in Berkshire, where one version of the Anglo-Saxon Chronicle was compiled. According to the abbey's records, in which he was called princeps Australium Saxonum, Eadwinus nomine (Eadwine leader of the South Saxons), he bequeathed estates to them in his will, although the document itself has not survived. Earlier in the same year he witnessed a charter of King Ethelred the Unready as Eaduuine dux. His name was also added to a forged charter dated 956 (possibly an error for 976).

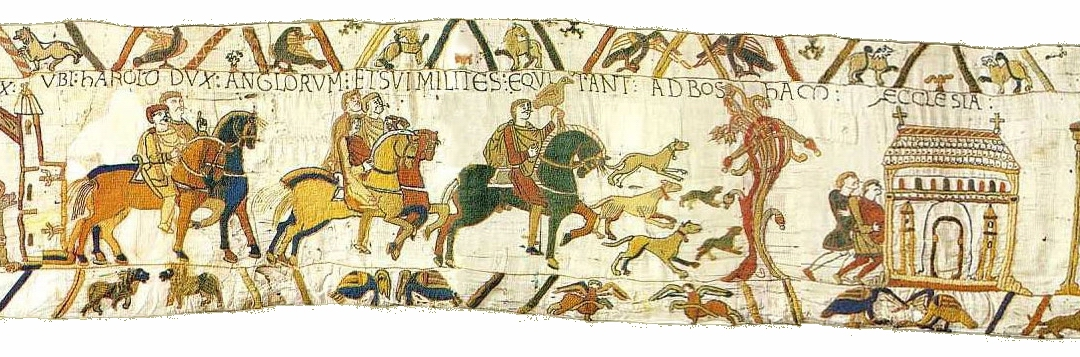
Harold Godwinson, the future king of England, shown on the Bayeux Tapestry riding with his knights to Bosham from where he set sail in 1064.

In the next generation, Wulfnoth Cild, a Sussex thegn, played a prominent part in English politics. In 1009 his actions resulted in the destruction of the English fleet, and by 1011 Sussex, together with most of South East England, was in the hands of the Danes. In an early example of local government reform, the Anglo-Saxon ealdormanries were abolished by the Danish kings and replaced with a smaller number of larger earldoms. Wulfnoth Cild was the father of Godwin, who was made Earl of Wessex in 1020. His earldom included Sussex. When he died in 1053, Godwin was succeeded as Earl of Wessex (including Sussex) by his son Harold, who had previously been Earl of East Anglia.

Edward the Confessor, who had spent much of his early life in exile in Normandy, was pro-Norman and in Sussex gave to the abbot of Fécamp Abbey the minster church at Steyning, as well as confirming land existing land grants at Hastings, Rye and Winchelsea. To his chaplain, Osborn, later William's Bishop of Exeter, Edward gave the harbour and other land at Bosham. Many of the Saxon nobles grew jealous and from 1049 there was conflict between the disgruntled Saxon nobility, the king and the incoming Normans. Godwine and his second son Harold kept the peace off the Sussex coast by using Bosham and Pevensey to drive away pirates. In 1049 the murder by Sweyn Godwinson of his cousin Beorn after Beorn has been tricked in going to Bosham resulted in the entire Godwine family being banished. It was from Bosham in 1051 that Godwin, Sweyn and Tostig fled to Bruges and the court of Baldwin V, Count of Flanders, a relative of Tostig's wife, Judith of Flanders. When they returned in 1052 to an enthusiastic welcome in the Sussex ports, Edward had to reinstate the Godwine family.

In 1064 Harold sailed from Bosham, from where a storm cast him up in Normandy. Here he was apparently tricked into pledging his support for William of Normandy as the next king of England. On 14 October 1066, Harold II, the last Saxon king of England was killed at the Battle of Hastings and the English army defeated, by William the Conqueror and his army. It is likely that all the fighting men of Sussex were at the battle, as the county's thegns were decimated and any that survived had their lands confiscated.

== Life and society ==
=== Defence and warfare ===
The earliest recorded Viking raid on Sussex took place in 895 and it was particularly difficult for a scattered farming community to meet these sudden attacks. In 895 the population of Chichester killed many hundreds of Danes who plundered the area. Eadulf, a Saxon noble, was appointed to organise the defence of Sussex but died from the plague before much could be done.

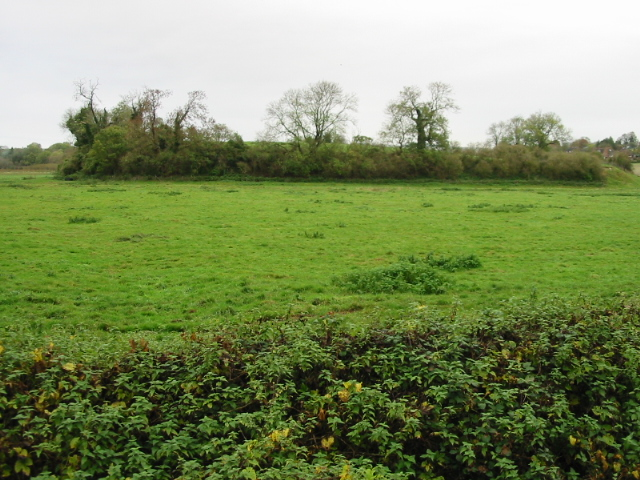
Remains of the burh wall at Burpham

Alfred the Great almost certainly inaugurated the building of a series of burhs or forts to be garrisoned at the threat of danger by men drawn from the surrounding population. The development of the burhs across the southern half of England suggests a considerable awareness of a repeated problem The Burghal Hidage documents five such fortifications in Sussex — at Chichester, Burpham, Lewes, Hastings and Eorpeburnan.

In the reign of Æthelred the Unready, the threat of the Danes continued — in 994 and 1000 the Anglo Saxon Chronicle records burning, plundering and manslaughter on the coast of Sussex and neighbouring counties. The most serious attacks took place in 1009, when a Viking army took up position over the winter period on the Isle of Wight and ravaged Sussex, Hampshire and Berkshire.

The rectilinear street plan of Chichester is typical of the towns which developed from the fortified burhs, which had intramural streets running around the town walls; this allowed garrison troops to defend the town and large peripheral blocks that were left as hedged areas (hagae) into which fugitives from the countryside could flee.

=== Economy ===
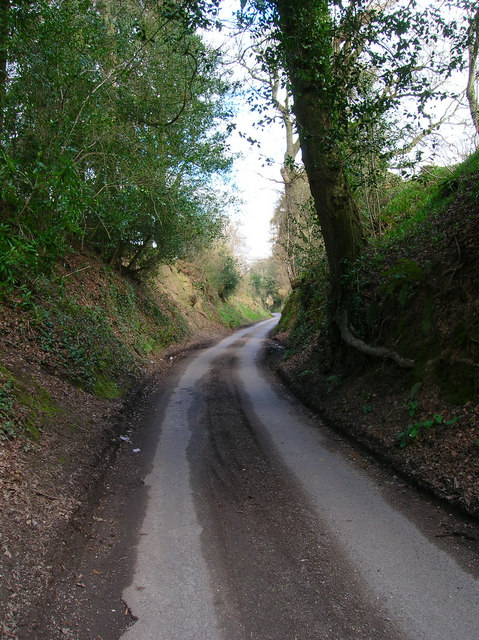
Droveways such as this one near Chanctonbury Ring were used throughout the Saxon period to transport pigs and cattle between coastal areas and summer pasture in the Weald

Deposited around c. 470 as the kingdom of Sussex was being established, the Patching hoard of coins represents the earliest early mediaeval coins found in Britain. The hoard includes five imported siliquae that had not been clipped, so coin-clipping had probably ceased by then, although the coinage had probably collapsed decades earlier than this, after Roman rule in Britain collapsed.

In the first quarter of the 8th century the Kingdom of Sussex was among the kingdoms producing coinage, possibly from a mint near Selsey where the finds of coins termed Series G sceattas are concentrated. That a cash economy had returned by the 10th century is suggested by the various mints which became increasingly plentiful after King Æthelstan reorganised England's coinage. There were mints at Chichester, Lewes and Steyning. A new mint also seems to have existed on a temporary basis in the Iron Age hillfort at Cissbury, which may have been refortified as a refuge during the Danish invasions in the reign of Æthelred the Unready. The Cissbury mint seems to have worked in close association with the mint at Chichester rather than replacing it. By the eve of the Norman conquest, there were further mints at Arundel, Pevensey and Hastings.

Lewes seems to have prospered with overseas trade; coins from Lewes stamped "LAE URB" travelled as far as Rome. The substantial sea-faring trade of Lewes is indicated by the payment of 20 shillings for munitions of war payable whenever Edward the Confessor's fleet put to sea. This is the probable origin of the Cinque Ports organisation that flourished under the Normans. The River Ouse would have been navigable at least as far north as Lewes. Armstrong argues that while Sussex was separated from much else of mainstream English experience, this should not hide the rich trade that Sussex had with other parts of Europe. By the 1060s Lewes also supported a cattle market.

By the end of the Anglo Saxon period and the Domesday Survey by the Normans in 1086, Sussex contained some of the richest and most heavily populated pockets of England on the coastal plain, albeit alongside some of England's most economically underdeveloped areas in the Weald. By this time, Sussex had a network of urban centres such that farmers were within 15 km to 30 km of market facilities.

Agriculture seems to have flourished on the Sussex coastal plain and on the Sussex Downs. The fact that the Sussex coast appears to have been relatively densely settled for centuries implies that the land was being more competently farmed than was typical of the standard of the day. The Weald was pig-fattening and cattle-grazing country. Drovers would divide their year between their "winter house" in their parent village outside the Weald and their "summer house" in the outlying woodland pasture up to 20 miles (30 km) away. Surviving features include a close network of former droveways and surviving fragments of wood pasture, such as the Mens and Ebernoe Common near Petworth.

The Domesday Book records that by the 11th century, the unknown Rameslie in Sussex had 100 salt pans to extract salt from sea water. Fisheries were also important to the economy of Sussex. Lewes was an important centre of a herring industry and had to pay a rent of 38,500 herrings for its sea fisheries.

=== Capital ===
At the time of the South Saxons it is unlikely that they would have had a capital in Sussex. The archaeologist Martin Biddle said that "the evidence we have for the residences and itineraries of English kings before the Norman conquest is all too thin" and according to Frank Stenton "In the eleventh century the conception of a capital city had not yet taken a definite shape anywhere in the west. The centre of government in England was the kings' mobile court. The king was free to hold a council at any point in his realm.." In Roman times Chichester was known as Noviomagus Reginorum and served as the capital of the Civitas Reginorum, a client kingdom ruled by Tiberius Claudius Cogidubnus. After the departure of the Romans, Noviomagus appears to have been largely abandoned with the earliest Saxon find, by archaeological excavation, being a small amount of mid-Saxon pottery dated around 8th-9th century.

Before Saxon occupation of Chichester, Sussex had been annexed, by the Kingdom of Wessex, in the middle of the 7th century.It was then ruled by Mercia and after regaining its independence, it was finally annexed and then absorbed, into Wessex, in 860. The Anglo Saxon Chronicle suggests that Sussex was founded in the Selsey and Chichester area, however the archaeology does not support this. What the archaeology does show is that the initial settlement, of the South Saxons, was in the downland areas, between the River Ouse and River Cuckmere to the east of Sussex. From there the South Saxons migrated to the west of Sussex and by the 680s the area between Chichester and Selsey had become the political and ecclesiastical centre of the kingdom with the kings residence in Orreo Regis (Kingsham), south west of Chichester, and Wilfrid's religious centre in Selsey. According to Martin Welch "After the Romans left there is no evidence for the reoccupation of Chichester till the 9th century", when it was rebuilt and fortified as part of a programme of defence, instigated by Alfred the Great, of Wessex, to protect against Danish raids.

=== Kingship ===
The South Saxon kingdom remains one of the most obscure of the Anglo-Saxon polities. A few names of South Saxon kings are recorded, and the history of the kingdom is sometimes illustrated by that of other areas, but information is otherwise limited. Sussex seems to have had a greater degree of decentralisation than other kingdoms. For a period during the 760s there may have been as many as four or five kings based within the territory, perhaps with each ruling over a distinct tribal territory, perhaps on a temporary basis. It seems possible that the people of the Haestingas may have had their own ruler for a while, and another sub-division may have been along the River Adur.

Complex tiers of relationships between kings and kingdoms existed. For instance in the 7th century, when Wulfhere of Mercia was trying to increase his influence over the South Saxons, he ceded control of the provinces of the Meonwara and Wight to the South Saxon king Æðelwealh. Wight at least had its own ruler, Arvald, who presumably recognised the authority of the South Saxon king, Æðelwealh, and who in turn recognised the overlordship of the Mercian king, Wulfhere.

The Kingdom of Sussex was an independent unit until the reign of Offa of Mercia. Under Offa, who ruled over most of the kingdoms of the heptarchy, local South Saxon rulers were allowed to continue provided that they recognised Offa's overriding authority and some estates seem to have come into his direct possession.

In the 9th century, Sussex was ruled by the West Saxons. It would appear that the ultimate intention of Æthelwulf of Wessex was for the kingdom of Wessex and the eastern regions of Sussex, Surrey, Kent and Essex to become separate kingdoms, with separate but related royal dynasties. It was only the early deaths of Aethelwulf's first two sons that allowed Æthelbert of Wessex, his third son, to reunite Wessex and the eastern regions, including Sussex, into a single kingdom in 860. This occurred only after Athelberht had secured the consent of his younger brothers, Aethelred and Alfred. Though in part due to the careful cultivation of conquered regions, the establishment of an enduring "Greater Wessex" stretching along the southern coast owed much to chance, early deaths, and perhaps, to the growing recognition of the need for unity in the face of an increasing Viking threat. Sussex was never again treated as part of an eastern subkingdom but was not closely integrated with the old West Saxon provinces either. Sussex seems to have had its own ealdorman for much of the 10th century.

Royal tributes and dues were often collected at settlements known as king's tuns, often a separate place from where the royal hall of that the king would stay when in the area. Sussex has several places that are king's tuns including from west to east, Kingston by Ferring, Kingston by Sea, now part of Shoreham-by-Sea, and Kingston near Lewes. King's tuns in Anglo-Saxon England often acted as places of assembly, where the king could settle disputes or hear appeals. According to Æthelstan, the first king of England, his grandmother Ælfthryth had the use of an estate at Æthelingadene (East and West Dean near Chichester). Ælfthryth may have brought up her grandchildren, the sons of Æthelred of Wessex, at Æthelingadene, which may have been one of the estates set aside for the benefit of the royal princes or Æthelings.

=== Law ===
Various folkmoots would have been held in Sussex, for instance at Ditchling, Tinhale (in Bersted) and Madehurst. Placename evidence for early assemblies in Sussex comes from Tinhale (from the Old English þing (thing) meaning hold a meeting, so "meeting-hill") and Madehurst (from the Old English maedel meaning assembly, so "assembly wooded hill"). There is also a location in Durrington that had the name gemot biorh meaning a moot barrow or meeting barrow, a boundary barrow.

The early hundreds often lacked the formality of later attempts of local government: frequently they met in the open, at a convenient central spot, perhaps marked by a tree, as at Easebourne. Dill, meaning the boarded meeting place, was one of the few hundreds in Sussex that provided any accommodation. From the 10th century onwards the hundred became important as a court of justice as well as dealing with matters of local administration. The meeting place was often a point within the hundred such as a bridge (as in the bridge over the western River Rother in Rotherbridge hundred) or a notable tree (such as a tree called Tippa's Oak in Tipnoak hundred).

It is also recorded that an England-wide Royal Council (Witenagemot) took place in Sussex on 3 April 930, when Æthelstan, the first king of the English, and his councillors gathered at Lyminster by the River Arun. Another Witenagemot took place in Sussex in the reign of Æthelstan (924-939), probably at Hamsey, on the River Ouse near Lewes.

A small number of diplomas (documents affirming the grant or tenure of specified land) from Sussex survive from this period.

By the 1060s Lewes may have been Sussex's legal centre.

=== Religion ===
After the departure of the Roman army, the Saxons arrived in Sussex in the 5th century and brought with them their polytheistic religion. The Saxon pagan culture probably caused a reversal of the spread of Christianity. Wilfrid's biographer records that in the year 666 Wilfrid's ship ran aground on the Sussex coast near Selsey where it was attacked and a pagan priest sought to cast magic spells from a high mound. Bede also refers to a mass suicide committed by groups of 40 or 50 men who jumped from cliffs during a time of famine. It is probable that these suicides represented sacrifices to appease the god Woden.

Æðelwealh became Sussex's first Christian king when he married Eafe, the daughter of Wulfhere, the Christian king of Mercia. In 681, Saint Wilfrid, the exiled Bishop of York, landed at Selsey and is credited with evangelising the local population and founding the church in Sussex. King Æðelwealh granted land to Wilfrid which became the site of Selsey Abbey. According to Bede, it was the lastarea of the country to be converted. While Wilfrid is credited with the conversion of the Kingdom of Sussex to Christianity, it is unlikely that it was wholly heathen when he arrived. Æðelwealh, Sussex's king, had been baptised. Damianus, a South Saxon, was made Bishop of Rochester in the Kingdom of Kent in the 650s and may indicate earlier missionary work in the first half of the 7th century. At the time of Wilfrid's mission there was a monastery at Bosham containing a few monks led by an Irish monk named Dicul, which was probably part of the Hiberno-Scottish mission of the time. Wilfrid was a champion of Roman customs and it was these customs that were adopted by the church in Sussex rather than the Celtic customs that had taken root in Scotland and Ireland.

Shortly after Æðelwealh granted land to Wilfrid for the church, Æðelwealh was killed by Cædwalla of Wessex, Sussex was conquered by Cædwalla and Christianity in Sussex was put under control of the diocese of Winchester. It was not until c. 715 that Eadberht, Abbot of Selsey was consecrated the first bishop of the South Saxons.

In the late 7th or early 8th century, St. Cuthman, a shepherd who may have been born in Chidham and had been reduced to begging set out from his home with his disabled mother using a one-wheeled cart. When he reached Steyning he saw a vision and stopped there to build a church. Cuthman was venerated as a saint and his church was in existence by 857 when King Æthelwulf of Wessex was buried there. Steyning was an important religious centre and St Cuthman's grave became a place of pilgrimage in the 10th and 11th centuries. According to the hagiography of the 11th century Secgan manuscript, another saint, St Cuthflæd of Lyminster, is buried in or near to Lyminster Priory. In 681, Bede records that an outbreak of the plague had devastated parts of England, including Sussex and the monks at Selsey Abbey fasted and prayed for three days for an end to the outbreak. A young boy with the plague prayed to St Oswald and his prayers were answered, and a vision of St Peter and St Paul was said to have appeared to the boy, telling the boy that he would be the last to die.

The church built at Steyning was one of around 50 minster churches across Sussex and these churches supplied itinerant clergy to surrounding districts. Other examples include churches at Singleton, Lyminster, Findon and Bishopstone. The jurisdiction of each minster church in the pre-Viking era seems to match early land divisions that were replaced by hundreds in the 10th or 11th centuries. It was not until 200–300 years after its conversion to Christianity in the 680s that a network of local parish churches existed in Sussex.

=== Slavery ===
Wilfrid's first act after he was given land at Selsey by King Æðelwealh was to build a monastery to free 250 male and female slaves from slavery who were tied to the estate. These people were probably mainly of Romano-British descent. This is an indication of the very high percentage of slaves in England at this time. Fisher argues that slavery would have been the fate of many people of Romano-British descent at this time. By the 11th century it has been estimated that the proportion of slaves in Sussex was very low at around 4 per cent, some of the lowest rates in England; this compares with 25 per cent in Gloucestershire, 18 per cent in Hampshire and 10 per cent in Kent.

== Culture ==
There is significant evidence for Frankish cultural influence on the kingdom of Sussex as well as the neighbouring kingdom of Kent; occasional references in Continental works suggest that Frankish kings may at one point have thought of the people of Sussex and other south eastern kingdoms as their political dependants.

According to Gabor Thomas, there are clear cultural differences between how wealth and status were expressed in South Saxon society compared with Anglo Saxon kingdoms to the north. In the kingdom of Sussex and the neighbouring kingdom of Kent the range of ornamented dress accessories metalwork is significantly more austere and limited that in kingdoms to the north. However alternative status symbols were used fully in Sussex by those with higher status. Archaeological evidence shows that luxury food items were consumed in Sussex and exuberant architectural displays were constructed, such as a cellared tower excavated at Bishopstone.

=== Art ===
From the beginning of the 6th century, Merovingian artefacts were present in Sussex, as they were in Kent and on the Isle of Wight, which is thought to reflect cross-Channel exchanges between Saxon Sussex and Merovingian Gaul. Assemblages such as have been found in Eastbourne show that Merovingian dress fashion had spread along the coastline of what is now Sussex, Kent and Hampshire and northern Gaul. Cemeteries at Alfriston, Highdown and Eastbourne show continuous contacts with Gaul from the first half of the 5th century until the early 7th century.

== Heraldic device ==
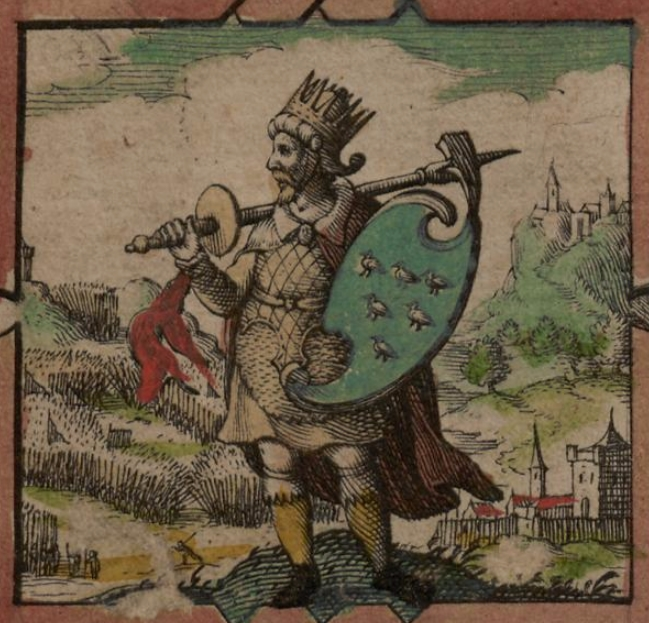
Depiction of Ælle holding a shield with a design representing Sussex, taken from John Speed's 1611 "Saxon Heptarchy"

The shield or emblem of Sussex, sometimes referred to as a coat of arms, consists of six gold martlets on a blue field. (Note: Sussex's six martlets are today held to symbolise the county's six rapes of Chichester, Arundel, Bramber, Lewes, Pevensey and Hastings. Martlets have appeared on heraldic shields in Sussex since the 14th century. Back then it was on the coat of arms belonging to Sir John de Radynden and featured silver birds on a blue background.) was attributed to the Kingdom of Sussex later in a work called "Saxon Heptarchy" by John Speed that dates from 1611. The depiction shows Ælle of Sussex, the founder and first king of Sussex, holding the shield over his shoulder.

== See also ==
- History of Sussex
- Timeline of Sussex history
- Sussex in the High Middle Ages
- History of Christianity in Sussex
- History of local government in Sussex

== Bibliography ==
- Abdy, Richard (2013). "The Patching Hoard". In Hunter, F; Painter, K (eds.). Late Roman silver and the end of the Empire: the Traprain Treasure in context. Society of Antiquaries of Scotland. ISBN 978-1-90833-202-8.
- Armstrong, J.R. (1971). A History of Sussex. Sussex: Phillimore. ISBN 978-0-85033-185-1.
- Bately, J.M., ed. (1986). The Anglo-Saxon Chronicle. Cambridge: D.D.Brewer. ISBN 978-0-85991-103-0.
- Bede (1990). Farmer, D.H. (ed.). Ecclesiastical History of the English People. Translated by Leo Sherley-Price. London: Penguin. ISBN 978-0-14-044565-7.
- Bell, Martin (1978). "Saxon Sussex". In Drewett, P. L. (ed.). Archaeology in Sussex to AD 1500 : essays for Eric Holden.
- Biddle, Martin (1981). "Capital at Winchester'". In Roesdahl, Else; Graham-Campbell, James; Connor, Patricia; Pearson, Kenneth (eds.). The Vikings in England, The Anglo-Viking Danish Viking Project. Anglo-Danish Viking Project. ISBN 0-9507432-0-8.
- Brandon, Peter, ed. (1978). The South Saxons. Chichester: Phillimore. ISBN 978-0-85033-240-7.
- Brandon, Peter (2006). Sussex. London: Phillimore. ISBN 978-0-7090-6998-0.
- Cunliffe, Barry (1973). The Regni. Peoples of Roman Britain. Duckworth. ISBN 978-0-71-560669-8.
- Darby, H.C (1987). "Geography". Domesday Book: Studies. Alecto. ISBN 978-0-948459-51-1.
- Down, Alex (1978). The Chichester Excavations 3. Chichester: Phillimore. ISBN 0-85033-272-9.
- Down, Alex; Welch, Martin (1990). The Chichester Excavations 7: Apple Down and the Mardens. Chichester: Chichester District Council. ISBN 978-0-85017-002-3.
- Drewett, Peter; Rudling, David; Gardiner, Mark (1998). The South East to AD 1000. Longman Higher Education. ISBN 978-0582492721.
- Dumville, David N (1997). "The Terminology of Overkingship in Early Anglo-Saxon England". In Hinds, John (ed.). The Anglo-Saxons from the Migration Period to the Eighth Century: An Ethnographic Perspective. Boydell Press. ISBN 0-85115-479-4.
- Fisher, D J V (2014). The Anglo-Saxon Age c.400-1042 A History of England. Routledge. ISBN 978-1317873204.
- Gardiner, Mark (2010). "Late Saxon Sussex c.650-1066". In Leslie, Kim; Short, Brian (eds.). An Historical Atlas of Sussex. Phillimore & Co Ltd. ISBN 9781860771125.
- Gelling, Margeret (2000). Place-Names in the Landscape. London: Phoenix. ISBN 1-84212-264-9.
- Goffart, Walter (2012). The Narrators of Barbarian History(ad 550-800). Notre Dame: University of Notre Dame. ISBN 978-0-268-02967-8.
- Haslam, Jeremy, ed. (1984). Anglo-Saxon Towns in Southern England. Chichester: Phillimore. ISBN 0-85033-438-1.
- Hawkes, Sonia Chadwick (1982). "Anglo-Saxon Kent c 425-725". In Leach, Peter E. (ed.). Archaeology in Kent to AD 1500: in memory of Stuart Eborall CBA Research Reports. Vol. Research Report Number 48. London: Council for British Archaeology. ISBN 0-906780-18-7.
- Higham, Nicholas; Ryan, M.J. (2013). The Anglo-Saxon World. Yale University Press. ISBN 9780300125344.
- Jones, Michael E. (1998). The End of Roman Britain. Ithaca, NY: Cornell University Press. ISBN 978-0-8014-8530-5.
- Kelly, S.E (1998). Anglo-Saxon Charters VI: Charters of Selsey. OUP for the British Academy. ISBN 978-0-19-726175-0.
- Kelly, S.E (2001). Anglo-Saxon Charters VIII: Charters of Abingdon Abbey, Pt. 2. OUP for the British Academy. ISBN 978-0-19-726221-4.
- Kelly, S.E. (1994). "Bishopric of Selsey". In Mary Hobbs (ed.). Chichester Cathedral. An Historic Survey. Chichester: Phillimore. ISBN 978-0-85033-924-6.
- Kelly, S.E. (2011). "Kings of the South Saxons (act. 477–772)". Oxford Dictionary of National Biography. Oxford University Press. doi:10.1093/ref:odnb/52344. (subscription, Wikipedia Library access or UK public library membership required)
- Kirby, D.P. (1978). "The Church in Saxon Sussex". In Brandon, Peter (ed.). The South Saxons. Chichester: Phillimore. ISBN 0-85033-240-0.
- Kirby, D.P. (2000). The Earliest English Kings. Routledge. ISBN 9780415242110.
- Leslie, Kim; Short, Brian (2010). An Historical Atlas of Sussex. Phillimore & Co Ltd. ISBN 9781860771125.
- Lapidge, Michael; Blair, John; Keynes, Simon; Scragg, Donald (2013). The Wiley Blackwell Encyclopedia of Anglo-Saxon England. Wiley. ISBN 9780470656327.
- Lavelle, Ryan (2003). Fortifications in Wessex c. 800-1066. Osprey Publishing. ISBN 978-1-84176-639-3.
- Livitt, Patricia (1990). "The Origin of Village Study and Gazetteer". In Down, Alex; Welch, Martin (eds.). The Chichester Excavations 7: Apple Down and the Mardens. Chichester: Chichester District Council. ISBN 978-0-85017-002-3.
- Lowerson, John (1980). A Short History of Sussex. Folkestone: Dawson Publishing. ISBN 978-0-7129-0948-8.
- Loyn, H.R. (1991). Anglo-Saxon England and the Norman Conquest. Longman. ISBN 9780582072978.
- Morris, John (1965). "Dark Age Dates". In Michael Jarrett; Brian Dobson (eds.). Britain and Rome.
- Myres, J.N.L. (1989). The English Settlements. Oxford University Press. ISBN 9780192822352.
- Naismith, Rory (2026). Offa, King of the Mercians. New Haven, Connecticut: Yale University Press. ISBN 978-0-300-25746-5.
- Phillips, C.B.; Smith, J.H. (2014). The South East from 1000 AD. Routledge. ISBN 9781317871699.
- Roach, Levi (2013). Kingship and Consent in Anglo-Saxon England, 871-978: Assemblies and the State in the Early Middle Ages. Cambridge University Press. ISBN 978-1107036536.
- Rushton, Neil S. (1999). "Parochialization and patterns of patronage in 11th-century Sussex" (PDF). Sussex Archaeological Collections (PDF). 137: 133–152. doi:10.5284/1086268.
- Sawyer, P.H. (1978). From Roman Britain to Norman England. St. Martin's Press. ISBN 9780312307837.
- Shapland, Michael (2023). Kaminski, Jamie (ed.). "Selsey Cathedral and the Early Medieval Kingdoms of Sussex". Sussex Archaeological Collections. 161. Lewes: Sussex Archaeological Society.
- Semple, Sarah (2013). Perceptions of the Prehistoric in Anglo-Saxon England: Religion, Ritual and Rulership in the Landscape. Oxford: Oxford University Press. ISBN 978-0199683109.
- Seward, Desmond (1995). Sussex. London: Random House. ISBN 978-0-7126-5133-2.
- Stenton, F.M. (1971). Anglo-Saxon England (3rd ed.). Oxford University Press. ISBN 978-0-19-280139-5.
- Swanton, Michael (1996). The Anglo-Saxon Chronicle. New York: Routledge. ISBN 978-0-415-92129-9.
- Thomas, Gabor (2001). "Hamsey, near Lewes, East Sussex=The Implications of Recent Finds of Late Anglo-Saxon Metalwork For Its Importance in the Pre-Conquest Period" (PDF). Sussex Archaeological Collections. 139: 123–132. doi:10.5284/1086206.
- Veitch, Robert (2021). "Emblems of Gold in a field of blue". Sussex Living Magazine. Burgess Hill, West Sussex: Sussex Living and Aiir. Archived from the original on 8 June 2021.
- Venning, Timothy (2013). An Alternative History of Britain: The Anglo-Saxon Age. Pen & Sword Books Limited. ISBN 9781781591253.
- Welch, Martin (1978). "Early Anglo Saxon Sussex". In Brandon, Peter (ed.). The South Saxons. Chichester: Phillimore. ISBN 978-0-85033-240-7.
- Welch, M.G. (1992). Anglo-Saxon England. English Heritage. ISBN 978-0-7134-6566-2.
- White, S; Manley, J; Jones, R; Orna-Ornstein, J; Johns, C; Webster, L (1999). "A Mid-Fifth Century Hoard of Roman and Pseudo-Roman Material from Patching, West Sussex". Britannia. 30. Society for the Promotion of Roman Studies: 301–315. doi:10.2307/526688. JSTOR 526688. S2CID 163048477.
- Williams, Ann (2003). Athelred the Unready: The Ill-Counselled King. A & C Black. ISBN 9781852853822.
- Yorke, Barbara (1995). Wessex: Studies in the early history of Britain. A&C Black. ISBN 9780718518561.
- Yorke, Barbara (2002). Kings and Kingdoms of Early Anglo-Saxon England. Seaby. ISBN 978-1-85264-027-9.
- Yorke, Barbara (2008). "Anglo-Saxon Origin Legends". In Barrow, Julia; Wareham, Andrew (eds.). Myth, Rulership, Church and Charters. London: Routledge. ISBN 978-0-75465120-8.
