= Aelfwald of Sussex =

King of Sussex

Ælfwald was a King of Sussex, who reigned jointly with Ealdwulf and Oslac, and probably also with Oswald and Osmund.

Ælfwald witnessed an undated charter of Ealdwulf, believed to be from about 765, with his name corruptly recorded as Ælhuuald rex.

Ælfwald also witnessed a charter of Offa, King of Mercia, dated 772, as Ælbuuald dux, with his name placed after Oswald, Osmund, but before Oslac.

He is not known to have issued charters of his own.

== Bibliography ==
- Flaherty, W. E. The Annals of England: An Epitome of English History. London, 1876.
- Kelly, S. E. "Kings of the South Saxons". Oxford Dictionary of National Biography. Retrieved September 4, 2007.
