= Æthelstan of Sussex =

Æðelstan (floruit 717–724) was a King, presumably of Sussex, reigning jointly with Noðhelm.

He witnessed Noðhelm's last surviving charter, which is dated 714 in error for 717, as Athelstan rex. There is no indication of his kingdom. The same charter was also witnessed by Queen Æðelðryð, as Edeldrið regina, presumably Æðelstan's wife. Barker (1947) speculated "They may well be the parents of the Æðelberht of twenty years later".
