= Oslac of Sussex =

Oslac was a King of Sussex. He reigned jointly with Ealdwulf and Ælfwald, and probably also Oswald and Osmund.

Oslac witnessed an undated charter of Ealdwulf, believed to be from about 765, with his name corruptly recorded in the surviving revision as Osiai rex.

After the conquest of Sussex by Offa, King of Mercia, Oslac witnessed a charter of Offa, dated 772, as Oslac dux, with his name placed after Oswald, Osmund, and Ælfwald, suggesting that he was the most junior of the former kings.

His latest surviving charter is dated 780, and the original still exists; in it he is styled Oslac dux Suthsaxorum.
