= Ealdwulf of Sussex =

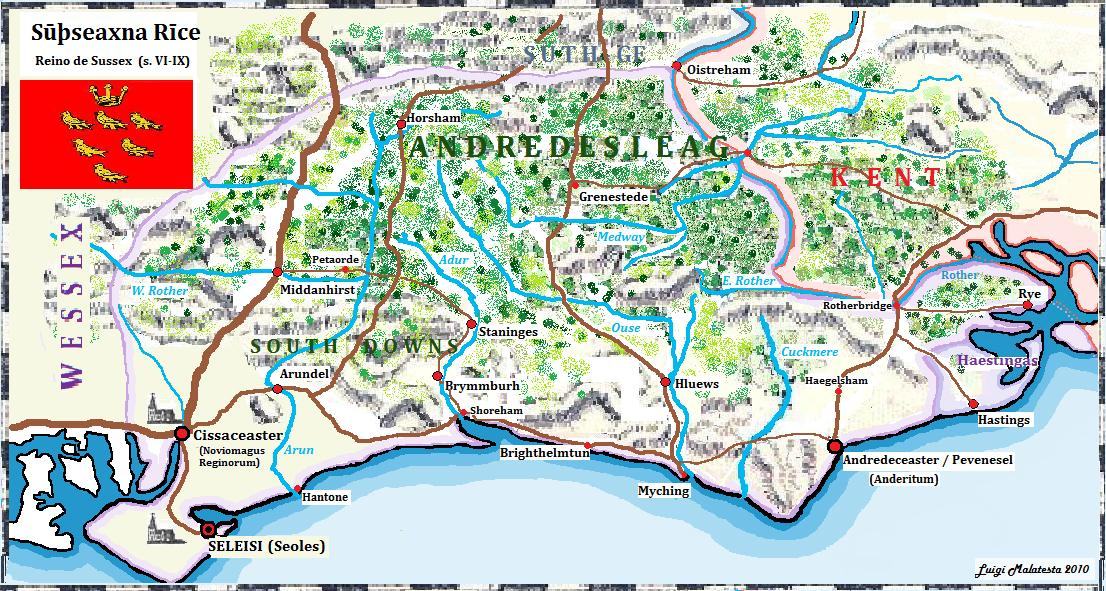
Susseaxna Rice Map

Ealdwulf was a King of Sussex, but is known only from his charters. He reigned jointly with Ælfwald and Oslac.

Ealdwulf issued an undated charter, believed to be from about 765, as Alduulf rex.

Later, he issued a further undated charter as Aldwlfus dux Suthsaxonum, and signed as Aldwlf dux, and another, dated 711 in error for 791, as Aldwlfus dux Suthsaxonum with the subscription Ealdwlf.

A stone marking the resting place of King Ealdwulf lies in the village of Westmeston, which lies in the Lewes District of East Sussex.
