= Osmund of Sussex =

King of Sussex

Osmund (fl. c. 760 – c. 772) was a King of Sussex, apparently reigning jointly with Oswald, Ælfwald, and Oslac.

According to the Anglo-Saxon Chronicle, version D, Osmund was reigning in Sussex when Archbishop Cuthbert died in 760, so his rule commenced before that event.

Osmund issued a charter, dated 762 in error for 765, as Osmundus.

Osmund also issued a charter dated 770 in which he is listed as Osmundus rex.

So Osmund's reign was from in or before 760 to between 770 and 772, as he witnessed a charter of Offa, King of Mercia, dated 772 as Osmund dux. Evidently he was demoted from king to ealdorman following Offa's conquest of Sussex.
