= Osric of Sussex =

Osric was possibly a King of Sussex, reigning jointly with Noðhelm.

There is an undated charter of Noðhelm that is witnessed by Osric, as Osricus, without indication of rank or territory, but listed before, and therefore ranked higher than, Eadberht, Bishop of Selsey, whose rank and see are also omitted. The charter can be dated to some point between about 705 and 717.
