= Watt of Sussex =

Watt (Note: also Wattus or What) was a king in what is now the county of Sussex in southern England. His existence is attested by three charters that he witnessed, in the reign of Noðhelm, as Wattus Rex. He probably would have ruled between about AD 692 and 725 and there is some suggestion that he may have been King of the Hæstingas.

== Charter evidence ==
Some of the Anglo-Saxon charters that date from the Kingdom of Sussex provide evidence which suggests the existence of two separate dynasties in Sussex. The charters of Noðhelm (or Nunna), who ruled Sussex in the late 7th and early 8th century regularly attest a second king by the name of Watt. Watt witnessed a charter from Noðhelm in 692, (Note: A.D. 692. Nothhelm (Nunna), king of Sussex, to Nothgyth, his sister; grant, in order to found a minster, of 33 hides (cassati) at Lidsey, Aldingbourne, Lenstedegate (? Westergate in Aldington) and (North) Mundham, Sussex. Latin) without any indication of his territory, he also witnessed (again as Wattus rex) a charter where Bruny (Bryni), dux of Sussex, grants to Eadberht, abbot of Selsey, 4 hides. The charter lacks a dating clause but as Eadberht was known to have been appointed bishop in 705 or slightly later, then the charter would have been created in 705 or slightly earlier. Watt is named as a witness on the charter together with Nunna. Watt is also listed as a witness (as Uuattus rex (Note: In the 7th century scribes wrote uu for /w/; later they used the runic symbol known as wynn)) of another charter, erroneously dated 775, which is believed to be a late copy or forgery. (Note: A.D. 775 for c. 705 x c. 717. Nunna, king of Sussex, to Eadberht, bishop; grant of 20 hides (tributarii) at Hugabeorgum and Dene (probably East and West Dean near Chichester). Latin with English bounds.)

== King of the Hæstingas ==
The historian C.T. Chevalier has suggested that Watt may have ruled the Haestingas tribe, which settled around the Hastings area of East Sussex. This is because place-names with the name Watt or What occur only in the Hastings area of Sussex. The theory has been seen as plausible by other historians. Chevalier goes on to suggest that the Haestingas may have been of Frankish origin, but other historians reject this part of the theory as it is based solely on a misinterpretation of the place-name evidence.

== See also ==
- History of Sussex
