= Nothhelm of Sussex =

Noðhelm, or Nunna for short, was King of Sussex, apparently reigning jointly with Watt, Osric, and Æðelstan.

== Life ==
Kelly noted the names of rulers in Sussex starting with Aethel- and Os- and suggested they might have been relatives. She also referred to the King list of Hwicce in this respect and its similarity. Queen Eafe was an Hwiccean princess (Bede) and married to Aethelwalh. Following Anglo-Saxon naming patterns (A-S genealogies and the observation of Kelly), King Aethelwalh could be said to have been an older relative of King Aethelstan and Queen Aethelthryth; Aethelstan and Aethelthryth could be said to have been older kinsfolk of King Aethelberht (of the South Saxons). Slaughter (Rulers of the South Saxons before 825) contends that Aethelthryth was Nothhelm's wife. Following the same comments from Kelly, it could also be said that Alderman Osric of Hwicce might have been an ancestor of Alderman Osric of Sussex and Bishop Osa of Selsey and that Kings Osmund and Oslac might have been younger members of the same family. On the same basis (re: genealogy of the later House of Wessex for comparison) Ealdberht, who rebelled against King Ine in 722 and 725 (A-S Chronicles), could have been a contemporary and relative of Aethelberht. This could point to Nothhelm having died in 722 and a bid by Ealdberht, known to have been a dissident (A-S Chronicles), to become a king in Sussex. King Watt is not heard of after circa 700 (cartulary evidence), indicating that he might have died at about this time.

In 692 Noðhelm granted land to his sister Noðgyð (Nothgyth). He was styled Nothelmus rex Suthsax’ in the body of the charter, but he signed it as Nunna rex Sussax’. Nothgyth was granted land to build a minster, and in the charter it states that she promised to be Bishop Wilfrid's nun and to go on a pilgrimage. In these early years a Christian example certainly needed to be set, for it was during the 690s that Cuthman established his mission at Steyning, otherwise known as Cuthman's Port, to convert the South Saxons from their heathenry. This was in spite of Wilfrid's conversion of Sussex in the previous decade. Moreover, there was the martyrdom of St Lewinna, killed by pagans c. 690 probably at Alfriston. Noðhelm’s last surviving charter, in which he was called Nunna rex Suthsax’, is dated 714, probably in error for 717, so his reign began in or before 692 and ended in or after 717. In this charter, witnessed by King Aethelstan and Queen Aethelthryth, Nothhelm expressed the wish to be buried at Church Norton. He is mentioned by the Anglo-Saxon Chronicle as fighting for his kinsman Ine, King of Wessex, against Geraint, King of the Britons, in the year 710. Many scholars are of the opinion that the main battle was fought at Langport in Somerset, where King Geraint of Dumnonia was slain (Armes Prydain). Another important event during Nothhelm's reign was the establishment of the Diocese of Selsey for the South Saxons, probably in 705 (Kelly). Until this development Sussex had come under the See of Winchester (Kelly). 705 is also the earliest date (Kelly) for Nothhelm's charter allowing four hides to be granted at Peppering to Berhfrith. This man was to build a church at Peppering where prayers could to be said for the king.

Two of his charters were witnessed <and signed?> by Cœnred, King of Wessex. Concerning one of these, strangely dated 775, Barker (1947) commented:

"20. Cœnred was the father of Ine. He is not mentioned in ASC. as having ever been king of Wessex; but ASC. says that Ini succeeded in 688 and abdicated in 728, while insisting on the length of his reign as 37 years. Cœnred appears for the last time in 692 (No. IV) and Ine was certainly sole king by 704, when then men of Kent compounded with him for the death of his relative Mul. Mul was Caedwalla's younger brother and the chroniclers record that when Caedwalla, king of the South Saxons, abdicated in 688 Ine succeeded him. The Anglo-Saxon conception of family as the basis of law was so strict that they would not have done so if his father had been alive (citation from Saxon Dooms needed). Therefore Cœnred must have died before 688 proving conclusively that this charter must bear date in 689 (but why 689?). In fact, to allow for a reign of 37 years (or nearly 37) by Ine, he (Ceonred ??) must have died in 692 (but Ine was elected King of the West Saxons in 688 and abdicated in 726). Coenred was a minor king in Wessex, but, quite apart from this, Cynegils and Cwichelm had ruled together ?614-636.
21. The signature of Ine here and in No. IV without the title rex bears out the statement of n. 20 about the reign of Cœnred. This is not surprising, since the main king list for Wessex at this time is thus: Cynegils 611-643, Cenwealh 643-645 and 648-672, Seaxburh 672-673, Aescwine 673-676, Centwine 676-685, Caedwalla 685-688, Ine 688-726.

But Kelly (1998) concluded that this charter "is without doubt a forgery, and not an innocent tenth-century copy of a genuine eighth-century charter. The incarnation date is impossible for the donor and beneficiary, and for the witnesses to the charter. Birch's suggested emendation to 725 is still unsatisfactory, since it is too late for Bishop Eadberht and does not agree with the indication". Hence it is wrong to extend Noðhelm's reign to 725 on the authority of this charter.
