= Timeline of conflict in Anglo-Saxon Britain =

The Timeline of conflict in Anglo-Saxon Britain is concerned with the period of history from just before the departure of the Roman Army, in the 4th century, to just after the Norman Conquest in the 11th century.

The information is mainly derived from annals and the Venerable Bede. The dates, particularly from the fourth to the late sixth centuries, have very few contemporary sources and are largely later constructions by medieval chroniclers. The historian Diana Greenway described one such 12th-century chronicler, Henry of Huntingdon, as a 'weaver' compiler of history, and the archaeologist Martin Welch described the Anglo-Saxon Chronicle as "a product of the West Saxon court... concerned with glorifying the royal ancestry of Alfred the Great. Manipulation of royal genealogies, in this and other sources, to enhance the claims of contemporary rulers was common. Literary formulas associated with original myths are a common feature of earlier entries." Although the timeline uses the annals for this period of history, information provided by these sources can be problematic, particularly with the earlier dates.

== Chronology ==
Constructing a chronology of the early Anglo-Saxon period, and how the Anglo-Saxons took over land in Britain from Romano-Britons (Celtic-speakers, Latin-speakers, or both), is highly complex. The limitations of source material place constraints on just how accurate any chronology can be. As an example, the following table shows how much variation there is between historians on just one date, the Battle of Badon:

Suggested dates for the Battle of Badon
| Sources | Date |
|---|---|
| Annales Cambriae | 516 |
| Bede | 493 |
| Higham | c. 430 – c. 440 |
| Snyder | c. 485 |
| M. Wood | 490s |
| Morris | 494–497 |
| Dumville | c. 500 |
| I. Wood | c. 485 – c.520 |

Much of the dating of the period comes from Bede (672/673–735), who in his Ecclesiastical History of the English People, tried to compute dates for events in early Anglo-Saxon history. Although primarily writing about church history, Bede is seen as Britain's first true historian, in that he cited his references and listed events according to dates rather than regnal lists. So we know that he relied heavily on De Excidio et Conquestu Britanniae by Gildas, a sixth-century cleric, for his early dates and historians have found Gildas unreliable where dates were concerned. Bede's work was widely read among the literate in the Anglo-Saxon kingdoms, and his dates were used by the monks who compiled the various Anglo-Saxon Chronicles from the late ninth century onwards. Some sources say that the Saxon warriors were invited to come, to the area now known as England, to help keep out invaders from Scotland and Ireland. Another reason for coming may have been because their land often flooded and it was difficult to grow crops, so they were looking for new places to settle down and farm.

The most controversial dates in the period—those from the fourth to the late sixth centuries—have very few contemporary sources, and are mainly derived from later attempts to construct Anglo-Saxon history.

The following is an outline of some events recorded in Bede's Ecclesiastical History, the Anglo-Saxon Chronicle, the Welsh Annals (Annales Cambriae), and Brut y Tywysogion. Many of the dates from the fourth, fifth, and sixth century are points of contention.

AC = "from the Annales Cambriae" (English translation at this link).
ASC = "from the Anglo-Saxon Chronicle".
B = "from Bede's writings".
ByT = "from Brut y Tywysogion".
(?) = Dates and events that are contentious or subject to debate.

== 4th century ==
- 360 and after, and perhaps before: various Germanic peoples (Alemanni, Saxons, etc.) came to Roman Britain: raiders, Roman armies recruited from among German tribes, some settlers (The Saxon Shore (Latin: litus Saxonicum)).

== 5th century ==
- 410 : Emperor Honorius refuses a call for help from Britain, and tells the cities to look to their own defence.
- 429 : Germanus of Auxerre leads Romano-Britons to victory over Saxon raiders.
- c. 430 to 520: The range of dates for the Battle of Badon. See effects of the battle for the strategic situation resulting afterwards.
- c. 446: The "Groans of the Britons" - A last appeal (possibly to the Consul Aetius) for the Roman army to come back to Britain.
- 449: Vortigern invites Saxons to come and help them against the Picts, who were raiding the east coast, and allows them to settle on "The eastern side of the island." (The name Vortigern may mean "Great King" rather than being a lifelong personal name.)
- 455: (Note: ASC 455. Her Hengest & Horsa fuhton wiþ Wyrtgeorne þam cyninge, in þære stowe þe is gecueden Agælesþrep, & his broþur Horsan man ofslog; & æfter þam Hengest feng to rice & Æsc his sunu.) (Battle of Aylesford: Here Hengest and Horsa fought against Vortigern the king, in the place that is called Aylesford, and his brother Horsa was slain; and after that Hengest took the throne with Æsc, his son.)
- 457: (Note: ASC 457.Her Hengest & Æsc fuhton wiþ Brettas in þære stowe þe is gecueden Crecganford & þær ofslogon .iiiim. wera, & þa Brettas þa forleton Centlond & mid micle ege flugon to Lundenbyrg.) (Here Hengest & Æsc fought against Britons in the place which is called Crecganford and there slew 4,000 men, and the Britons abandoned Kent and with great fear fled to London.)
- c. 460: Treachery of the Long Knives. Death of all British kings, and the beginning of violent land grab by Saxons.
- 466: Battle of Wippedesfleot (Note: ASC 465. Her Hengest & Æsc gefuhton uuiþ Walas neah Wippedesfleote & þær .xii. wilisce aldormenn ofslogon, & hiera þegn an þær wearþ ofslægen, þam wæs noma Wipped.) Here Hengest and Æsc fought together against the Welsh (meaning 'foreigner': the manner in which the invaders referred to the Britons) near Wippedesfleot and there slew 12 Welsh chief men, and one of their thanes was slain, whose name was Wipped. [This battle is said to have resulted in much bloodshed and slaughter on both sides, to the extent that hostilities abated for a while thereafter. It is not known where Wippedesfleot (= "Wipped's tidal estuary") was.])
- 473: (Note: ASC 473. Her Hengest & Æsc gefuhton wiþ Walas & genamon unarimedlico herereaf, & þa Walas flugon þa Englan swa þær fyr.) (Here Hengest & Æsc fought against Welsh and took countless war-loot, and the Welsh fled from the English like fire.)
- 477:(?) (Note: ASC 477. Her cuom Ælle on Bretenlond & his .iii. suna, Cymen & Wlencing & Cissa, mid .iii. scipum on þa stowe þe is nemned Cymenesora, & þær ofslogon monige Wealas & sume on fleame bedrifon on þone wudu þe is genemned Andredesleage.) (Here Ælle came to Britain and [with him] his 3 sons Cymen & Wlencing & Cissa, with 3 ships to the place which is named Cymenesora [probably now The Owers, rocks off Selsey in West Sussex], and there slew many Welsh & drove some in flight into the wood which is called Andredesleag [= The Weald ].)
- 485: Battle of Mercredesburne (Note: ASC 485. Her Ælle gefeaht wiþ Walas neah Mearcrædesburnan stæðe.) (Here Ælle fought against Welsh near the margin of Mearcrædesburna [= Mearcræd's stream].)
- 491: (Note: ASC 491.Her Ælle & Cissa ymbsæton Andredescester & ofslogon alle þa þe þærinne eardedon; ne wearþ þær forþon an Bret to lafe.) (Here Ælle and Cissa besieged Andredescester [now Pevensey] and slew all who dwelt therein; no Briton was left [alive] afterwards.)
- c. 497: The Anglo-Saxons are defeated in the Battle of Mons Badonicus by the Britons led by Ambrosius Aurelianus (possible King Arthur).

== 6th century ==
- c. 500: Average of suggested dates for the Battle of Badon.
- c. 500: Angles colonised the North Sea and Humber coastal areas, particularly around Holderness.
- 501: (Note: ASC 501.Her cuom Port on Bretene & his .ii. suna Bieda & Mægla mid .ii. scipum on þære stowe þe is gecueden Portesmuþa & ofslogon anne giongne Brettiscmonnan, swiþe æþelne monnan.) (Here Port and his 2 sons Bieda and Mægla came to Britain with 2 ships to the place which is called Portsmouth and slew a young British man, a very noble man. [But this may be an old fiction, as a folk-etymology to explain the placename Ports-mouth.] )
- 508: (Note: ASC 508.Her Cerdic & Cynric ofslogon ænne Brettisccyning, þam was nama Natanleod, & .v. þusendu wera mid him. Æfter was þæt lond nemned Natanleaga oþ Cerdicesford.) (Here Cerdic and Cynric slew a British king, whose name was Natanleod, and 5000 men with him. Afterwards that land was named Natanleag as far as Cerdicesford [= North Charford and South Charford ].)
- c. 520: Saxons took control of Sussex, Kent, East Anglia and part of Yorkshire, West Saxons founded a Kingdom in Hampshire under Cerdic.
- 535 & 536: The extreme weather events of 535–536 likely caused a great famine and thus population loss.
- In or before 547: Bernicia established by Angles taking over part of a British area called Bryneich.
- Around 549: A great plague caused much population loss.
- 556 Battle of Beran Byrig. The West Saxons are said to have defeated the Britons at Barbury Castle Hill Fort near Swindon.
- About 560: Saxons conquered all of east Yorkshire and the British kingdom of Ebrauc, and there established Deira.
- 571: (Note: ASC 571.Her Cuþwulf feaht wiþ Bretwalas æt Bedcan forda. & .iiii. tunas genom, Lygeanburg. & Ægelesburg. Benningtun. & Egonesham. & þy ilcan geare he gefor.) (Battle of Bedcanford: Here Cuthwulf fought against Britons at Bedcanford and took 4 settlements: Limbury, Aylesbury, Benson & Eynsham. And in the same year he died.)
- 573: Battle of Arfderydd at Arthuret in Cumbria: Briton fought Briton and weakened their numbers.
- 577: Battle of Dyrham: Capture of Glevum, Corinium, Aquae Sulis by Saxons of Wessex led by Cealin. (Note: ASC 577.Her Cuþwine & Ceawlin fuhton wiþ Brettas, & hie .iii. kyningas ofslogon, Coinmail, & Condidan, & Farinmail, in þære stowe þe is gecueden Deorham. & genamon .iii. ceastro Gleawanceaster, & Cirenceaster, & Baþanceaster.) (Here Cuthwine and Ceawlin fought against Britons and they slew 3 kings: Coinmail & Condidan & Farinmail, in the place which is called Dyrham, and took 3 towns: Gloucester & Cirencester & Bath. ): These entries seem to show that the Britons' defences in the English Midlands collapsed, and the peace that followed the Battle of Mons Badonicus ended, and the Saxons obliterated the British Watling Street salient and united their areas and overran the London - Verulamium area and much of the plain of the Midlands. Loss of Bath would separate the Britons of Wales from the Britons of the southwest. After this, the border between Saxons and the southwest Britons was probably at the Wansdyke along the ridge of the Mendip Hills.
- 581: Ælla of Deira took land from the Britons, thus establishing or enlarging Deira.
- c. 584: The Kingdom of the Iclingas became Mercia.
- 584: (Note: ASC 584.Her Ceawlin & Cuþa fuhton wiþ Brettas, in þam stede þe mon nemneþ Feþanleag. & Cuþan mon ofslog. & Ceaulin monige tunas genom, & unarimedlice herereaf, & ierre he hwearf þonan to his agnum.) (Battle of Fethanleag: Here Ceawlin and Cutha fought against Britons in the place that is named Fethanleag and Cutha was slain, and Ceawlin took many settlements and countless war-loot, and in anger he returned to his own land.)
- 590: Elmet joined an alliance of British kingdoms against the expanding Angles of Bernicia. See Elmet and History of Yorkshire#Sub-Roman.
- 592: West Saxons were defeated in the Battle of Woden's Burg (Wōden's Burg).
- 596: Angles defeated an alliance of Britons, Scots and Picts in the Battle of Raith.
- Afterwards: The British king, Urien of Rheged was murdered. A feud broke out between two of this alliance's key members.
- 597: St. Augustine of Canterbury, a monk sent by Pope Gregory I, arrived in the Kingdom of Kent on a mission to convert the Anglo-Saxons to Christianity, under the patronage of King Æthelberht of Kent, reputedly a descendant of Hengest.

== 7th century ==
- c. 600: Battle of Catraeth (Catterick): also see Y Gododdin: An army from the Celtic kingdom of Gododdin fell in battle against the Angles of Deira and Bernicia at Catterick in Yorkshire.
- c. 604: Deira and Bernicia united as Northumbria.
- Afterwards: Elmet built earthworks in near Aberford, north and west of Barwick-in-Elmet where Elmet's king's seat was.
- 614: (Note: ASC 614.Her Cynegils & Cuichelm gefuhton on Beandune, & ofslogon .ii. þusendo Wala & .lxvi.) (Here Cynegils and Cwichelm fought together at Beandun, and slew 2,066 Welsh.)
- 616: Autumn – Northumbria invaded and conquered Elmet.
- 616: Likeliest date for the Battle of Chester, between a Northumbrian army and a Welsh army: heavy Welsh casualties, and their defeat severed the land connection between Wales and the Celts of northwest Britain.
- 616 or 617: Battle of the River Idle – major victory for Rædwald of East Anglia over Æthelfrith of Northumbria.
- 633, 12 October: Battle of Hatfield Chase (AC: 630, Meigen) near Doncaster in Yorkshire: Gwynedd and Mercia attacked and defeated Northumbria; Elmet and Ebrauc temporarily returned to Celtic rule.
- 633 or 634: Battle of Heavenfield (AC: 631, Cantscaul) about 6 miles NW of Hexham: Northumbria expels the Gwynedd army.
- 642: (Note: ASC 642.Her Oswald Norþanhymbra cyning ofslægen wæs.) (Here Oswald king of Northumbria was slain) This may be the same battle as:-
- 644: The Battle of Maserfield (alias Battle of Maes Cogwy), in which Oswald king of the Northmen and Eawa king of the Celtic Mercians fell. AC B
- 652: Cenwalh of Wessex won a battle at Bradford-on-Avon.
- 655, 15 Nov: Battle of the Winwaed in which King Oswiu of Bernicia defeated and killed King Penda of Mercia. King Cadafael ap Cynfeddw of Gwynedd was allied with Penda but stayed out of the battle.
- 658: (Note: ASC 658.Her Cenwalh gefeaht æt Peonnum wiþ Walas, & hie gefliemde oþ Pedridan; þis wæs gefohten siþþan he of East Englum com. He wæs þær .iii. gear on wrece, hæfde hine Penda adrifenne, & rices benumenne. forþon he his swostor anforlet.) (Here Cenwalh fought against Welsh [= Britons] at Penselwood, and drove them in flight as far as [the river] Parrett [in Somerset]; this was fought after he came from East Anglia. He was there 3 years in exile. Penda had driven him out, and taken his kingdom, because he abandoned his [= Penda's] sister.)
- 682: (Note: ASC 682. On þissum geare Centwine gefliemde Bretwealas oþ sę.On the Parker MS it was 682. On the Cotton Tiberius 683) This year also, Centwine chased the Britons into the sea.

== 8th century ==
- 710: (Note: ASC 710..... & þam ylcan geare feaht Beorhtfrið ealdorman wið Pehtas betwux Hæfe & Cære, & Ine & Nun his mæg gefuhton wið Gerente Weala cyninge,) (... and in the same year ealdorman Beorhtfrith fought against Picts between [the rivers] Avon and Carron [which flow into the River Forth from the south about 20 miles west of Edinburgh ], and Ine and his relative Nunna fought against Geraint king of Welsh ... [This second battle may have been the Battle of Llongborth.] ) ...
- 722: According to the Annales Cambriae, 722 saw "the battle of Hehil among the Cornish, the battle of Garth Maelog, [and] the battle of Pencon among the south Britons, and the Britons were the victors in those three battles."
- Before 730: Northumbria annexed the kingdom of Rheged.
- 760: A battle between the Britons and the Saxons, the Battle of Hereford, in which Dyfnwal son of Tewdwr dies. AC
- 778: The devastation of the South Britons by Offa. AC
- 779: "Cynewulf and Offa fought at Bensington, and Offa took the town." Asc
- 784: The devastation of Britain by Offa in the summer AC
- 794: (Note: ASC 794.Her Adrianus papa & Offa cyning forþferdon ...) (796 [corrected from 794]: In this year Pope Hadrian and king Offa die.) (AC: 797: Offa king of the Mercians and Maredudd king of the Demetians die, and the battle of Rhuddlan.)
- 798: Caradog king of Gwynedd is killed by the Saxons. AC

== 9th century ==
- 813: (Note: ASC 813.... & þy geare gehergade Ecgbryht cyning on West Walas from easteweardum oþ westewearde.) (815 [corrected from 813]: ... and in this year king Ecgbryht raided in Cornwall from east to west.)
- 816: ... Saxons invaded the mountains of Eryri and the kingdom of Rhufoniog. AC
- 818: Cenwulf devastated the Dyfed region. AC
- 822: The fortress of Degannwy is destroyed by the Saxons and they took the kingdom of Powys into their own control. AC
- 823: (Note: ASC 823.Her wæs Wala gefeoht & Defna æt Gafulforda. ...) (825 [corrected from 823]: Here was a fight of Welsh/Britons [against] men of Devon at Gafulford ...)
- 825: The Battle of Ellendun was fought in Wiltshire between Ecgberht of Wessex and Beornwulf of Mercia It effectively ended Mercian Supremacy over the southern kingdoms of Anglo-Saxon England and established West Saxon dominance in southern England.
- 835: (Note: ASC 835.Her cuom micel sciphere on Westwalas & hie to anum gecierdon, & wiþ Ecgbryht West Seaxna cyning winnende wæron. Þa he þæt hierde & mid fierde ferde & him wiþ feaht æt Hengestdune & þær gefliemde ge þa Walas ge þa Deniscan.) (838 [corrected from 835]: Here a great ship-army [of Vikings] came to Cornwall and they [= the Cornish] joined them, and were fighting against Ecgbryht king of the West Saxons. Then he heard and with an army fought against them at Hengestdun and there put to flight both the Cornish and the Danes.)
- 877: Rhodri Mawr, a Welsh opponent of the Vikings, and his son Gwriad were killed by Mercian forces, even though Mercia was almost completely under the control of the Vikings at the time. AC
- 878: Alfred the Great defeated the remnants of the Great Heathen Army at The Battle of Edington. A
- 893:A combined force containing men from Mercia, Wessex and Wales besieged the Vikings at Buttington for several weeks, starving them out until finally the Vikings had to emerge and they were defeated there by the English and the Welsh: the surviving Vikings fled back to Essex.A

== 10th century ==
- 4 and 5 August 910 Battle of Wednesfield near Wolverhampton. 'The first written references to Wednesfield came in the Anglo-Saxon Chronicle where there is mention of a great battle at Wednesfield in which the Mercians and their allies inflicted a defeat on the Danes, leading to the effective end of their power.'
- 927: Athelstan evicted the Cornish from Exeter and refortified the city.
- 934: Æthelstan's invasion of Scotland
- 936: King Athelstan set the boundary between England and Cornwall at the River Tamar.
- 937: Æthelstan's victory at the Battle of Brunanburh
- 946: ... And Strathclyde was laid waste by the Saxons. AC

== 11th century ==
- 1016: Battle of Assandun, fought in Essex on 18 October between the armies of Edmund Ironside (King of England) and Canute (King of Denmark).
- 1059: Macht, son of Harold, came to Wales with a great army in his train; and the Prince Gruffudd, and Macht, with combined forces, proceeded against the Saxons, and devastated the country of England a great way towards its centre; and they returned to Wales with great spoil. ByT
- 1060: Caradoc, son of Rhydderch, son of lestin, hired Harold to come with an army to S.Wales. Then, conjointly with a great host of the men of Glamorgan and Gwent, they went against Grufudd. After Grufudd, son of Llywelyn, was slain, his head was cut off and taken as a present to Harold. (The ASC dates this as 1063) ByT
- 1063: Here Earl Harold and his brother Earl Tostig went into Wales both with land-army and ship-army, and conquered that land; and that people gave hostages and submitted to them, and afterwards went to and killed their king Gruffudd, and brought Harold his head, and he set another king for it. ASC (Peterborough manuscript).
- 1066: Battle of Hastings. William, Duke of Normandy, came as an intruder to the island of Britain, and a pitched battle took place between him and Harold; in which, after a severe and bloody fight, Harold was killed. ByT
- 1068: Some of the Saxons sought protection from the Normans in Powys then.. Afterwards, by the power of the Saxons, Bleddyn, son of Cynvyn, reigned sole king of Gwynedd and Powys; and Meredydd, son of Owain, son of Edwin, by the power of the Saxons became prince of South Wales. ByT

== ASC Notes ==
The Timeline was constructed using the following extracts from the Anglo-Saxon Chronicle, they are in their original Old English form. For a more complete version and explanation Click Here :

== See also ==
- Anglo-Saxon invasion of Britain
- Anglo-Saxon England
- Kingdom of Gwynedd
- Kingdom of Powys
