= Ebbsfleet, Thanet =

Hamlet in Kent, England

Coordinates: 51.315°N 1.350°E

Ebbsfleet
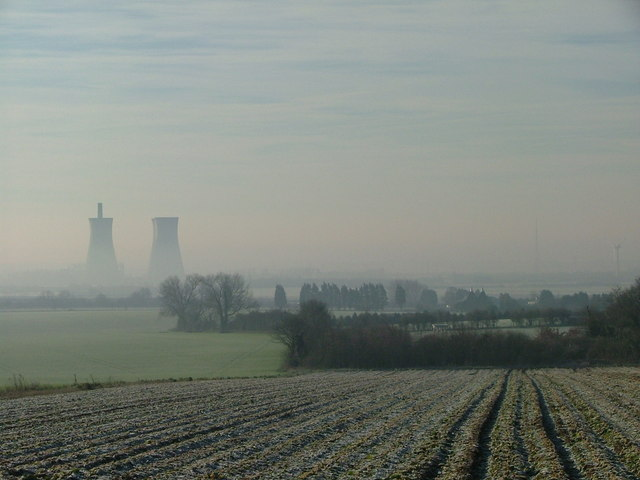
- Farmland at Ebbsfleet, with Richborough Power Station in the distance (prior to the demolition of the cooling towers in 2012)

- Location within Kent
- OS grid reference: TR333631
- Civil parish: Minster
- District: Thanet
- Shire county: Kent
- Region: South East
- Country: England
- Sovereign state: United Kingdom
- Post town: RAMSGATE
- Postcode district: CT12
- Police: Kent
- Fire: Kent
- Ambulance: South East Coast
- UK Parliament: Herne Bay and Sandwich

Ebbsfleet is a hamlet near Ramsgate, Kent, at the head of Pegwell Bay. Historically it was a peninsula on the southern coast of the Isle of Thanet, marking the eastern end of the Wantsum Channel that separated Thanet from the Kentish mainland. It is in the civil parish of Minster-in-Thanet.

Pegwell Bay is a natural harbour on the part of the coast nearest to the Continent, and consequently, Ebbsfleet was the focus of three important arrivals in English history: Julius Caesar’s first invasion of England, in 54 BC; then Hengist and Horsa, said to have led the Anglo-Saxons in their conquest of Britain, in AD 449; and, lastly, Augustine of Canterbury, who converted much of England to Christianity, in 597.

Ebbsfleet is the titular see of the Bishop of Ebbsfleet, an episcopal visitor for the Province of Canterbury.

== Geography ==
Ebbsfleet Lane marks the line of the peninsula today. The Wantsum Channel silted up and was reclaimed in the 15th century; all that remains of it is the channel of the River Stour, which enters the sea by Richborough Power Station. There are a couple of houses and Ebbsfleet House at Stonelees, where Ebbsfleet Lane meets the Sandwich road, and Ebbsfleet Farm on the hill behind.

== History ==
There are prehistoric, Iron Age, Roman, and Saxon settlement remains on the peninsula around Ebbsfleet Farm, which may have also been the landing stage for the Roman ferry across the channel to Richborough. Archaeologists suggest that Pegwell Bay was the site of both Roman invasions of Britain. Julius Caesar may have landed here on 4 July 54 BC; Claudius landed his army at Richborough, on the other side of the channel, to start his AD 43 invasion; and the site became a major port of Roman Britain.

According to the Anglo-Saxon Chronicle it is also the site of the landings made by the Saxons in the fifth century AD; an entry states that Hengist and Horsa, on the invitation of Vortigern, King of the Britons, landed in 449 at Eopwinesfleot, usually assumed to be Ebbsfleet. A fleot is a creek and Eopwine is a Germanic personal name; the modern Ebbsfleet may have developed from Eoppa/Eobba, a short form of this name. The arrival of the Saxons is commemorated by a monument and replica longship up the coast at Cliffsend. The Battle of Wippedesfleot between the Britons and the English in 465 is thought to have taken place at Ebbsfleet.

Bede wrote in his Ecclesiastical History: "On the east of Kent is the large Isle of Thanet containing, according to the English way of reckoning, 600 families, divided from the other land by the river Wantsum, which is about three furlongs over, and fordable only in two places, for both ends of it run into the sea. In this island landed the servant of our Lord, Augustine, and his companions, being, as is reported, nearly forty men. They had, by order of the blessed Pope Gregory, taken interpreters of the nation of the Franks."

This has been interpreted to mean Ebbsfleet was where Augustine landed. In 1884, St Augustine's Cross was erected on the lane between Cliffsend and Sevenscore to commemorate his first sermon in Kent.

== Energy ==
Richborough Power Station to the south was operational from 1962 to 1996; the towers were demolished in 2012. The power lines are being reused for the Thanet Wind Farm in the sea off Broadstairs.

Ebbsfleet Solar Farm is on the site of the former Richborough Power Station. It has a capacity of 4.9 MWp and became operational in 2011. The solar farm is part of a larger ongoing project, Richborough Energy Park.

== Archaeology ==
The site of Julius Caesar's landing in Britain, on 4 July 54 BC, had been a source of dispute. It was assumed that a fort would have been built to protect the landing, and none had been found. On 29 November 2017, archaeologists from the University of Leicester, led by Honorary Research Professor Andrew Fitzpatrick, announced that during the excavation they had done at Ebbsfleet, fortifications had been found.
