= 465 =

465 in various calendars
- Gregorian calendar: 465; CDLXV
- Ab urbe condita: 1218
- Assyrian calendar: 5215
- Balinese saka calendar: 386–387
- Bengali calendar: −129 – −128
- Berber calendar: 1415
- Buddhist calendar: 1009
- Burmese calendar: −173
- Byzantine calendar: 5973–5974
- Chinese calendar: 甲辰年 (Wood Dragon); 3162 or 2955 — to — 乙巳年 (Wood Snake); 3163 or 2956
- Coptic calendar: 181–182
- Discordian calendar: 1631
- Ethiopian calendar: 457–458
- Hebrew calendar: 4225–4226
- Hindu calendars
- Vikram Samvat: 521–522
- Shaka Samvat: 386–387
- Kali Yuga: 3565–3566
- Holocene calendar: 10465
- Iranian calendar: 157 BP – 156 BP
- Islamic calendar: 162 BH – 161 BH
- Javanese calendar: 350–351
- Julian calendar: 465; CDLXV
- Korean calendar: 2798
- Minguo calendar: 1447 before ROC 民前1447年
- Nanakshahi calendar: −1003
- Seleucid era: 776/777 AG
- Thai solar calendar: 1007–1008
- Tibetan calendar: ཤིང་ཕོ་འབྲུག་ལོ་ (male Wood-Dragon); 591 or 210 or −562 — to — ཤིང་མོ་སྦྲུལ་ལོ་ (female Wood-Snake); 592 or 211 or −561

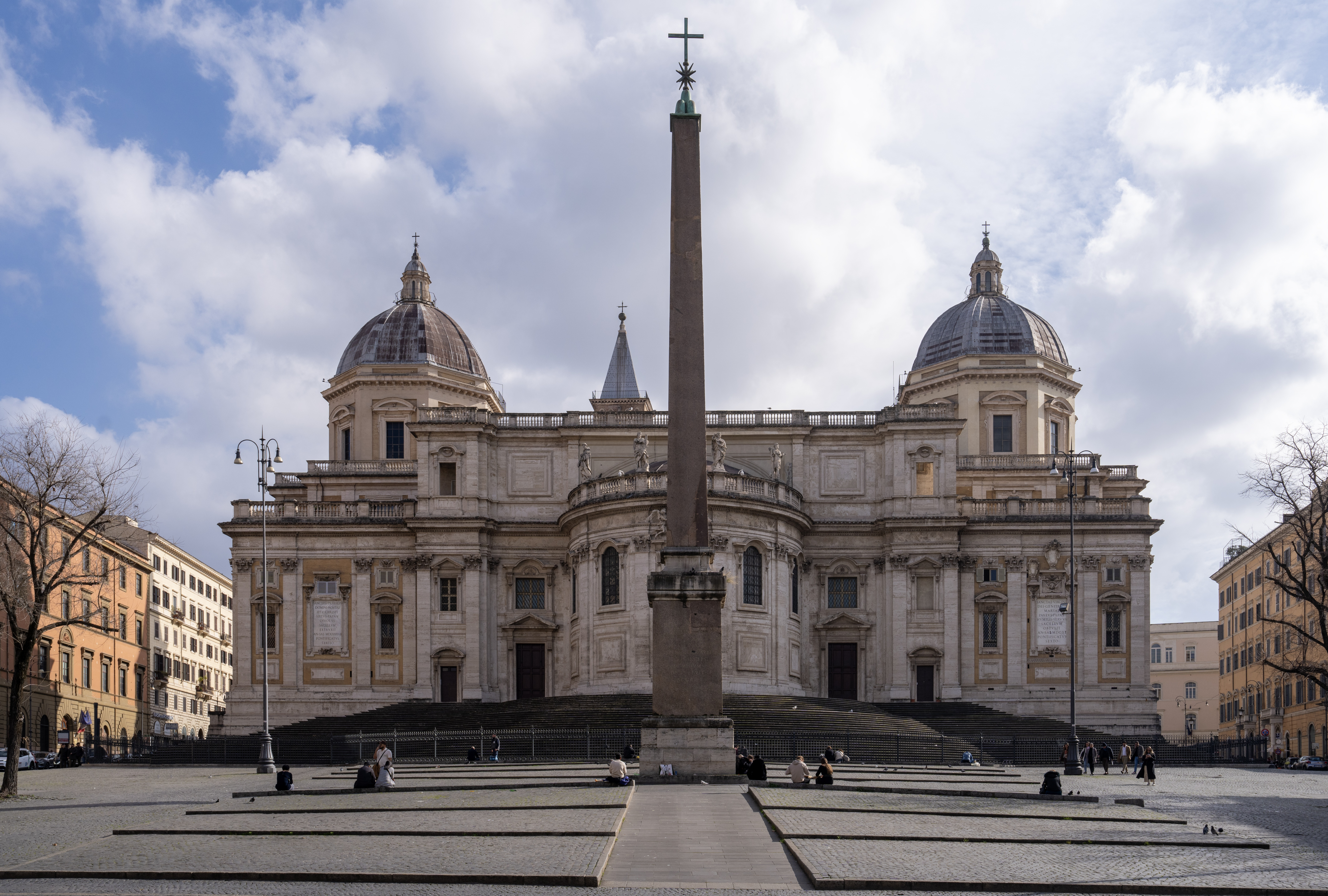
The Santa Maria Maggiore (Rome)

Year 465 (CDLXV) was a common year starting on Friday of the Julian calendar. At the time, it was known as the Year of the Consulship of Hermenericus and Basiliscus (or, less frequently, year 1218 Ab urbe condita). The denomination 465 for this year has been used since the early medieval period, when the Anno Domini calendar era became the prevalent method in Europe for naming years.

== Events ==
=== By place ===
==== Roman Empire ====
- Basiliscus, with the help of his sister Verina (wife of emperor Leo I), becomes a consul in the Eastern Roman Empire.
- August 15 – Libius Severus, puppet emperor of the Western Roman Empire, dies after a 4-year reign.
- September 2 – A fire begins in Constantinople and, over the next six days, destroys the buildings in eight of the 14 sections into which the Eastern Roman Imperial capital had been divided.
- Ricimer, de facto ruler, establishes political control for 2 years from his residence in Rome.

==== Britannia ====
- Battle of Wippedesfleot: The Saxons under command of Hengist and Aesc are defeated by the Britons near Ebbsfleet (Kent). During the battle 12 Welsh leaders are killed (according to the Anglo-Saxon Chronicle).

==== Europe ====
- King Remismund establishes a policy of friendship with the Visigoths, and promotes the conversion of the Suebi into Arianism in Galicia (Northern Spain).

==== China ====
- Qian Fei Di, then Ming Di, becomes ruler of the Liu Song dynasty after his nephew is assassinated.

=== By topic ===
==== Religion ====
- November 19 – Pope Hilarius convokes a synod at Rome's Church of Santa Maria Maggiore.
- Peter the Fuller becomes patriarch of Antioch (approximate date).

== Births ==
- July 5 – Ahkal Moʼ Nahb I, Maya ruler of Palenque (d. 524)
- Dubricius, bishop and saint (approximate date)
- Liberius, Roman aristocrat (approximate date)
- Procopius of Gaza, Christian sophist and rhetorician (approximate date)
- Severus, patriarch of Antioch (approximate date)
- Zacharias Rhetor, bishop and ecclesiastic historian (approximate date)

== Deaths ==
- May 5 – Gerontius, Archbishop of Milan
- June 20 – Wen Cheng Di, emperor of Northern Wei (b. 440)
- August 15 – Libius Severus, emperor of the Western Roman Empire
- Buliugu Li, official of the Northern Wei dynasty
- Eógan mac Néill, king of Tír Eoghain (Ireland)
- Liu Chuyu, princess of the Liu Song dynasty
