= Weald =

Area of South East England

Coordinates: 51°N 0.4°E

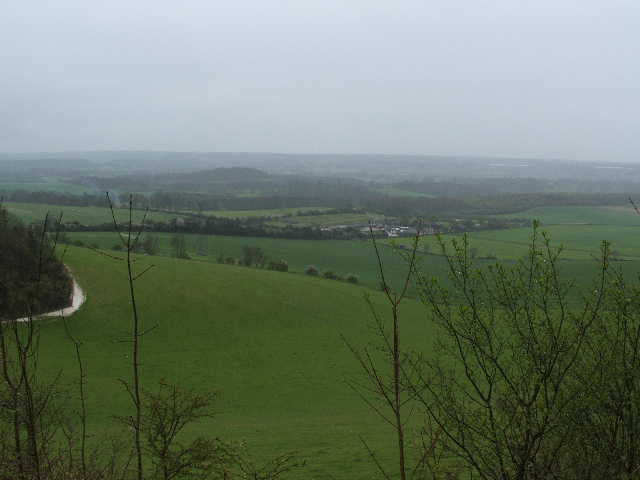
View south across the Weald of Kent as seen from the North Downs Way near Detling

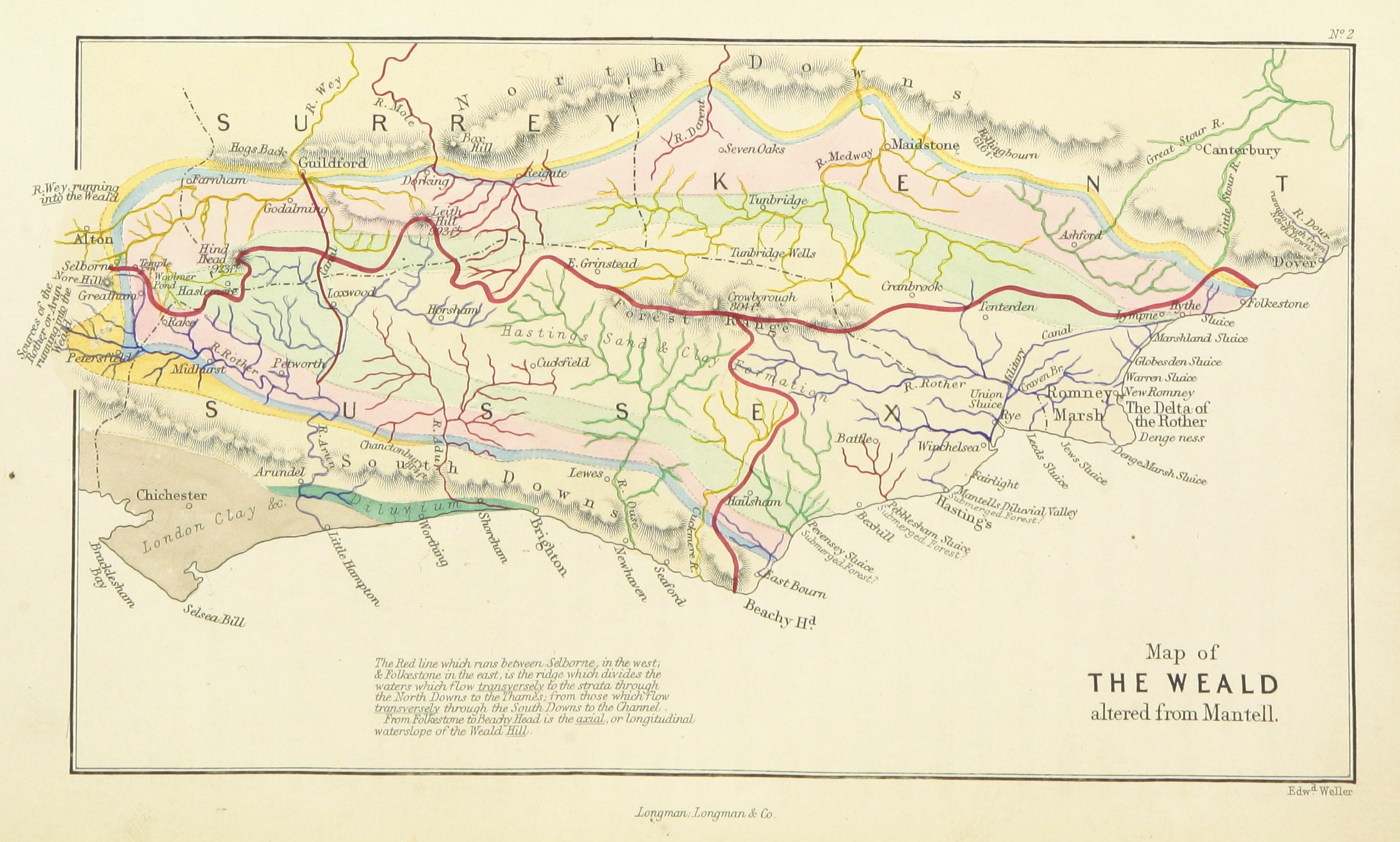
Map of the Weald

The Weald (/ˈwiːld/) is an area of South East England between the parallel chalk escarpments of the North and the South Downs. It crosses the counties of Hampshire, Surrey, West Sussex, East Sussex, and Kent. It has three parts, the sandstone "High Weald" in the centre, the clay "Low Weald" periphery and the Greensand Ridge, which stretches around the north and west of the Weald and includes its highest points. The Weald once was covered with forest and its name, Old English in origin, signifies "woodland". The term is still used, as scattered farms and villages sometimes refer to the Weald in their names.

== Etymology ==
The name "Weald" is derived from the Old English weald, meaning "forest" (cognate of German Wald, but unrelated to English "wood"). This comes from a Germanic root of the same meaning, and ultimately from Indo-European. Weald is specifically a West Saxon form; with wold as the Anglian dialect form of the word. The Middle English form of the word is wēld, and the modern spelling is a reintroduction of the Old English form attributed to its use by William Lambarde in his A Perambulation of Kent of 1576.

In early medieval Britain, the area had the name Andredes weald, meaning "the forest of Andred", the latter derived from Anderida, the Roman name of present-day Pevensey. The area is also referred to in early English texts as Andredesleage, where the second element, leage, is another Old English word for "woodland", represented by the modern leigh.

== Geology ==
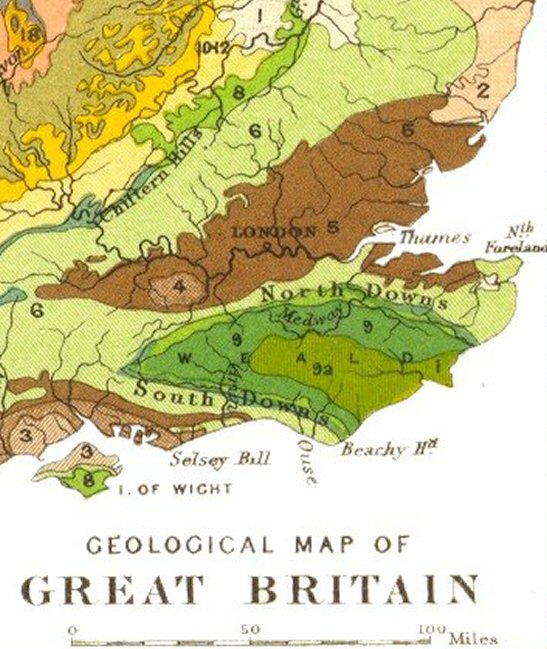
Geology of south-eastern England showing the High Weald in yellow-green (9a) and the Low Weald in darker green (9); chalk downland is in pale green (6)

Geological section from north to south: High and Low Weald shown as one

The Weald is the eroded remains of a geological structure, an anticline, a dome of layered Lower Cretaceous rocks cut through by weathering to expose the layers as sandstone ridges and clay valleys. The oldest rocks exposed at the centre of the anticline are correlated with the Purbeck Beds of the Upper Jurassic. Above these, the Cretaceous rocks, include the Wealden Group of alternating sands and clays – the Ashdown Sand Formation, Wadhurst Clay Formation, Tunbridge Wells Sand Formation (collectively known as the Hastings Beds) and the Weald Clay. The Wealden Group is overlain by the Lower Greensand and the Gault Formation, consisting of the Gault and the Upper Greensand.

The rocks of the central part of the anticline include hard sandstones, and these form hills now called the High Weald. The peripheral areas are mostly of softer sandstones and clays and form a gentler rolling landscape, the Low Weald. The Weald–Artois Anticline continues some 40 miles (64 km) further south-eastwards under the Straits of Dover, and includes the Boulonnais of France.

In the first edition of On The Origin of Species, Charles Darwin used an estimate for the erosion of the chalk, sandstone and clay strata of the Weald in his theory of natural selection. Charles Darwin was a follower of Lyell's theory of uniformitarianism and decided to expand upon Lyell's theory with a quantitative estimate to determine if there was enough time in the history of the Earth to uphold his principles of evolution. He assumed the rate of erosion was around one inch per century and calculated the age of the Weald at around 300 million years. Were that true, he reasoned, the Earth itself must be much older. In 1862, William Thomson (later Lord Kelvin) published a paper "On the age of the sun's heat", in which – unaware of the process of solar fusion – he calculated the Sun had been burning for less than a million years, and put the outside limit of the age of the Earth at 200 million years. Based on these estimates he denounced Darwin's geological estimates as imprecise. Darwin saw Lord Kelvin's calculation as one of the most serious criticisms to his theory and removed his calculations on the Weald from the third edition of On the Origin of Species.

Modern chronostratigraphy shows that the Weald Clays were laid down around 130 million years ago in the Early Cretaceous.

Many important fossils have been found in the sandstones and clays of the Weald, including Baryonyx, discovered in 1983. The Piltdown Man hoax specimen was claimed to have come from a gravel pit at Piltdown near Uckfield. The first Iguanodon was identified after the fossil collector and illustrator Mary Ann Mantell supposedly unearthed some fossilised teeth by a road near Cuckfield in 1822. Her husband, the geologist Gideon Mantell sent them to various experts and this important find led to the discovery of dinosaurs. The area contains significant reserves of shale oil, totalling 4.4 billion barrels of oil in the Wealden basin according to a 2014 study, which then Business and Energy Minister Michael Fallon said "will bring jobs and business opportunities" and significantly help with UK energy self-sufficiency. Fracking in the area would be required to achieve these objectives, which has been opposed by environmental groups.

== History ==
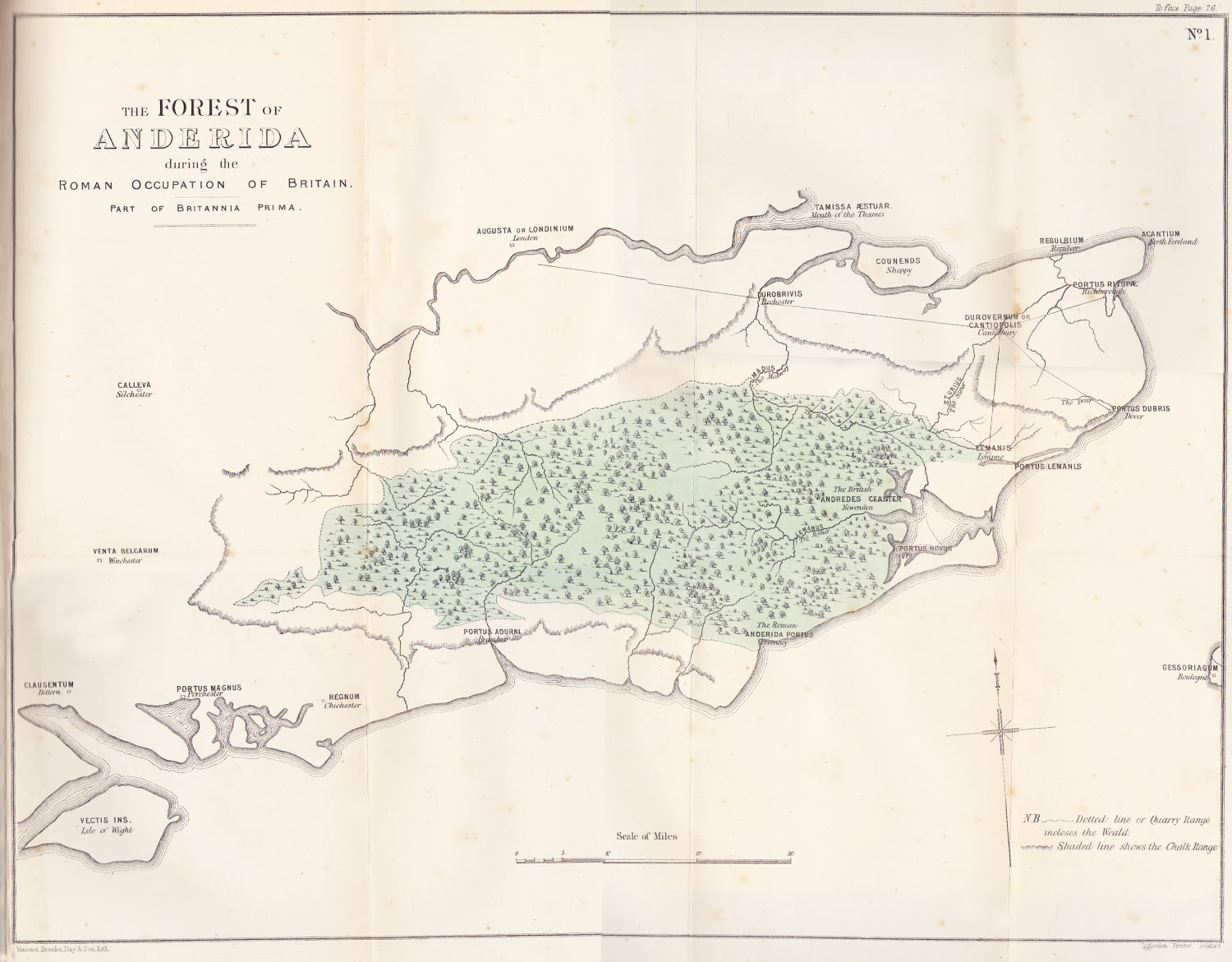
The Forest of Anderida during the Roman occupation of Britain

Prehistoric evidence suggests that, following the Mesolithic hunter-gatherers, the Neolithic inhabitants had turned to farming, with the resultant clearance of the forest. With the Iron Age came the first use of the Weald as an industrial area. Wealden sandstones contain ironstone, and with the additional presence of large amounts of timber for making charcoal for fuel, the area was the centre of the Wealden iron industry from then, through the Roman times, until the last forge was closed in 1813. The index to the Ordnance Survey Map of Roman Britain lists 33 iron mines, and 67% of these are in the Weald.

The Weald is thought to have undergone repeated cycles of clearance and re-forestation, and the decline in the population following the end of the Romano-British period allowed the tree cover to re-establish. According to the 9th-century Anglo-Saxon Chronicle, the Weald measured 120 miles (193 km) or longer by 30 miles (48 km) in the Saxon era, stretching from Lympne, near Romney Marsh in Kent, to the Forest of Bere or even the New Forest in Hampshire. The area was sparsely inhabited and inhospitable, being used mainly as a resource by people living on its fringes, much as in other places in Britain such as Dartmoor, the Fens and the Forest of Arden. While most of the Weald was used for transhumance by communities at the edge of the Weald, several parts of the forest on the higher ridges in the interior seem to have been used for hunting by the kings of Sussex.

The forests of the Weald were often used as a place of refuge and sanctuary. The Anglo-Saxon Chronicle relates events during the Anglo-Saxon conquest of Sussex when the native Britons (whom the Anglo-Saxons called Welsh) were driven from the coastal towns into the forest for sanctuary:

AD 477. This year came Ælle to Britain, with his three sons, Cymen, and Wlenking, and Cissa, in three ships; landing at a place that is called Cymenshore. There they slew many of the Welsh; and some in flight they drove into the wood that is called Andred'sley.

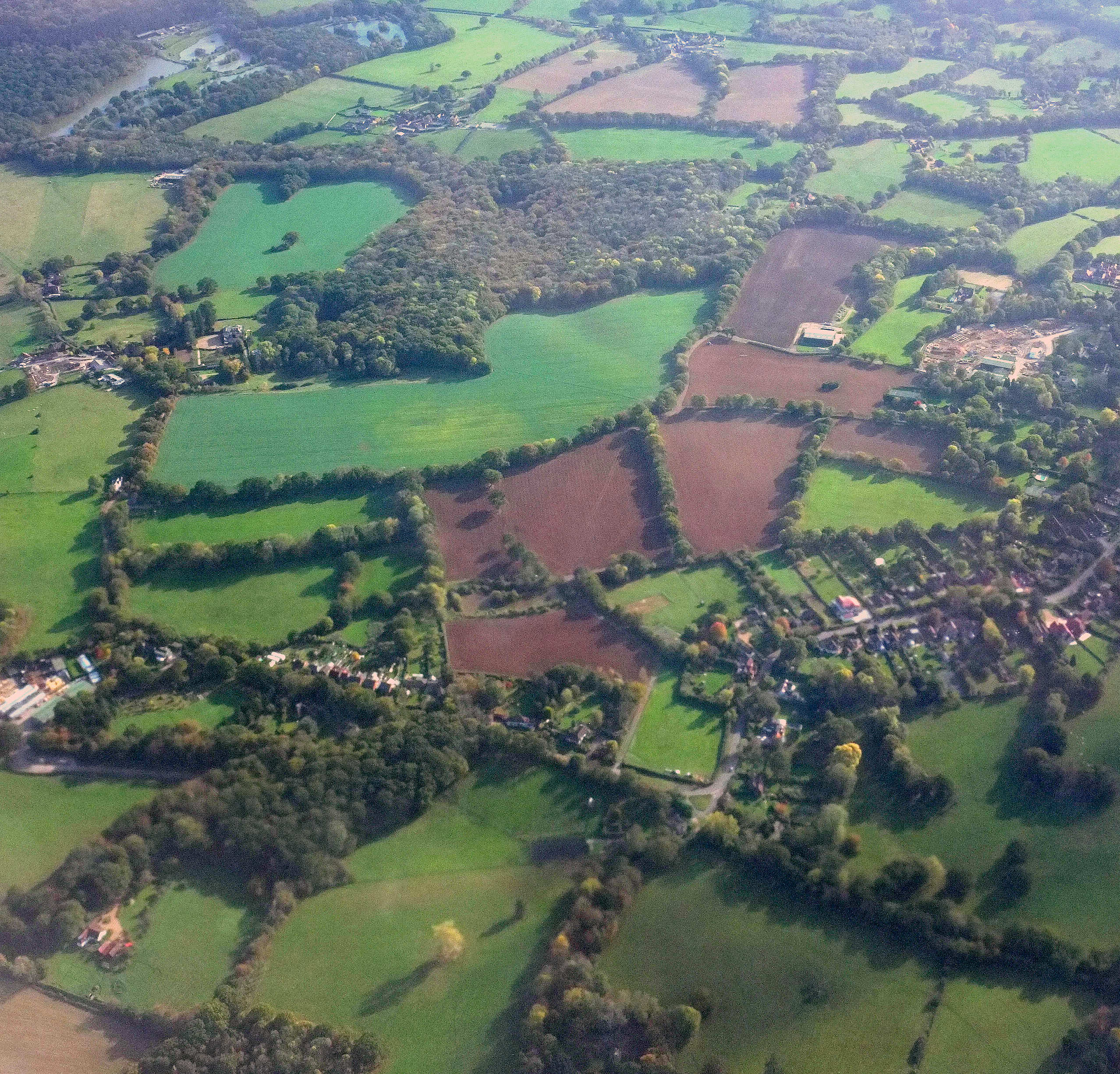
The bocage pattern of fields and woodland on the Surrey–West Sussex border between Ewhurst and Rudgwick

Domesday Book of 1086 suggests that the Weald was sparsely populated, but Peter Brandon suggests that the inhabitants and settlements may have been undercounted. The population of the area increased steadily between 800 and 1300, as woodland was cleared, resulting in the bocage pattern of irregularly shaped fields. Charters of Sele and Lewes Priories from the end of the 11th century, indicate that numerous churches had been established in the Sussex Weald. Similarly, the Domesday Monachorum of Christ Church Canterbury, compiled 1089–c. 1100, suggests that Kent Weald had already been divided into parishes by the start of the 12th century.

The origins of several Wealden settlements are reflected in their toponyms. Villages whose names end in —fold, were established on better drained soils by inhabitants of the Sussex Coastal Plain in the late Anglo-Saxon period. The suffix derives from the Old English falod, meaning an enclosure of pasture. These folds were occupied on a seasonal basis to graze livestock during the summer months. Settlements ending in —den, found in the Kentish Weald, were established on a similar basis. The seasonal settlements in the region are thought to have become permanently occupied by the end of the 12th century. By the outbreak of the Black Death in England in June 1348, most parts of the Weald were under human influence.

In 1216 during the First Barons' War, a guerilla force of archers from the Weald, led by William of Cassingham (nicknamed Willikin of the Weald), ambushed the French occupying army led by Prince Louis near Lewes and drove them to the coast at Winchelsea. The timely arrival of a French fleet allowed the French forces to narrowly escape starvation. William was later granted a pension from the Crown and made warden of the Weald in reward for his services.

The inhabitants of the Weald remained largely independent and hostile to outsiders during the next decades. In 1264 during the Second Barons' War, the royalist army of King Henry III of England marched through the Weald in order to force the submission of the Cinque Ports. Even though they were not aligned with the rebellious barons, the Weald's natives – mostly operating as archers – opposed the royalist advance, using guerrilla warfare. Even though they were unable to stop the army, their attacks inflicted substantial losses on the royalists. In retribution, King Henry ordered the execution of any Weald archers who were captured alive, for instance beheading 300 after a local shot his cook. The king also fined Battle Abbey for the disloyalty of its tenants.

== Geography ==
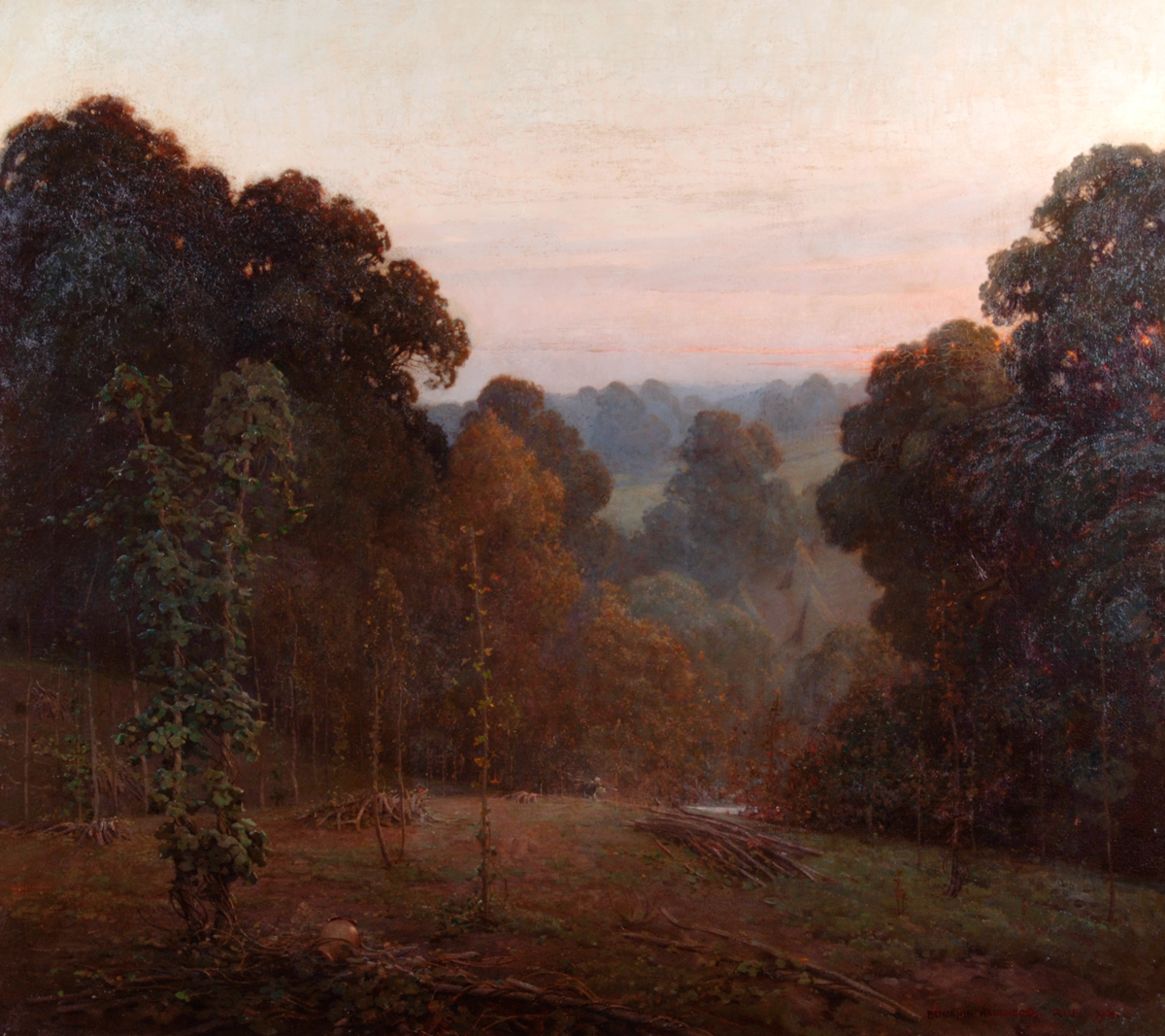
Autumn, Weald of Kent (1904), by Benjamin Haughton

The Weald begins north-east of Petersfield in Hampshire and extends across Surrey and Kent in the north, and Sussex in the south. The western parts in Hampshire and West Sussex, known as the Western Weald, are included in the South Downs National Park. Other protected parts of the Weald are included in the Surrey Hills Area of Outstanding Natural Beauty and the High Weald Area of Outstanding Natural Beauty. In extent it covers about 85 miles (137 km) from west to east, and about 30 miles (48 km) from north to south, covering an area of some 500 square miles (1,300 km^{2}). The eastern end of the High Weald, the English Channel coast, is marked in the centre by the high sandstone cliffs from Hastings to Pett Level; and by former sea cliffs now fronted by the Pevensey and Romney Marshes on either side.

Much of the High Weald, the central part, is designated as the High Weald Area of Outstanding Natural Beauty. Its landscape is described as:

rolling hills, studded with sandstone outcrops and cut by streams to form steep-sided ravines (called gills); small irregular-shaped fields and patches of heathland, abundant woodlands; scattered farmsteads and sunken lanes and paths.

Ashdown Forest, an extensive area of heathland and woodland occupying the highest sandy ridge-top at the centre of the High Weald, is a former royal deer-hunting forest created by the Normans and said to be the largest remaining part of Andredesweald.

There are centres of settlement, the largest of which are Horsham, Burgess Hill, East Grinstead, Haywards Heath, Tonbridge, Tunbridge Wells, Crowborough; and the area along the coast from Hastings and Bexhill-on-Sea to Rye and Hythe.

The geological map shows the High Weald in lime green (9a).

The Low Weald, the periphery of the Weald, is shown as darker green on the map (9), and has an entirely different character. It is in effect the eroded outer edges of the High Weald, revealing a mixture of sandstone outcrops within the underlying clay. As a result, the landscape is of wide and low-lying clay vales with small woodlands ("shaws") and fields. There is a great deal of surface water: ponds and many meandering streams.

Some areas, such as the flat plain around Crawley, have been utilised for urban use: here are Gatwick Airport and its related developments and the Horley-Crawley commuter settlements. Otherwise the Low Weald retains its historic settlement pattern, where the villages and small towns occupy harder outcrops of rocks. Settlements tend to be small, because of its original wooded nature and heavy clay soils, although many villages with good transport links have undergone expansion starting in the 20th century.

The Weald is drained by the many streams radiating from it, the majority being tributaries of the surrounding major rivers: particularly the Mole, Medway, Stour, Rother, Cuckmere, Ouse, Adur and Arun. Many of these streams provided the power for the watermills, blast furnaces and hammers of the iron industry and the cloth mills. By the later 16th century, there were as many as one hundred furnaces and forges operating in the Weald.

== Transport infrastructure ==
The M25, M26 and M20 motorways all use the Vale of Holmesdale to the north, and therefore run along or near the northern edge of the Weald. The M23/A23 road to Brighton, uses the western, narrower, part of the Weald where there are stream headwaters, crossing it from north to south. Other roads take similar routes, although they often have long hills and many bends: the more sedate, but busy A21 trunk road to Hastings is still beset with traffic delays, despite having had some new sections.

Five railways once crossed the Weald, now reduced to three. Building them provided the engineers with difficulties in crossing the terrain, with the hard sandstone adding to their problems. The Brighton Main Line followed the same route as its road predecessors: although it necessitated the construction of Balcombe tunnel and the Ouse Valley Viaduct. Tributaries of the River Ouse provided some assistance in the building of now-closed East Grinstead–Lewes and Uckfield–Lewes lines. The Tonbridge–Hastings line had to negotiate difficult terrain when it was first built, necessitating many sharp curves and tunnels; and similar problems had to be faced with the Ashford-Hastings line.

Several long-distance footpaths criss-cross the Weald, and it is well-mapped recreationally, covered by routes from:

- The Ramblers' Associations and most District Councils for walkers
- Sustrans and local county councils for cyclists

== Farming ==
Neither the thin infertile sands of the High Weald or the wet sticky clays of the Low Weald are suited to intensive arable farming and the topography of the area often increases the difficulties. There are limited areas of fertile greensand which can be used for intensive vegetable growing, as in the valley of the Western Rother. Historically the area of cereals grown has varied greatly with changes in prices, increasing during the Napoleonic Wars and during and since World War II.

About 60% of the High Weald farmed land is grassland, with about 20% being arable.

The Weald has its own breed of cattle, called the Sussex, although the breed has been as numerous in Kent and parts of Surrey. Bred from the strong hardy oxen, which continued to be used to plough the clay soils of the Low Weald longer than in most places, these red beef cattle were highly praised by Arthur Young in his book Agriculture of Sussex when visiting Sussex in the 1790s. William Cobbett commented on finding some of the finest cattle on some of the region's poorest subsistence farms on the High Weald. Pigs, which were kept by most households in the past, were able to be fattened in autumn on acorns in the extensive oak woods. In his novel Memoirs of a Fox-hunting Man, the poet and novelist Siegfried Sassoon refers to "the agricultural serenity of the Weald widespread in the delicate hazy sunshine".

Viticulture has expanded quite rapidly across the Weald, where the climate and soil is well suited to the growing of grapes, with over 20 vineyards now in the Wealden district alone.

== Wildlife ==
The Weald has largely maintained its wooded character, with woodland still covering 23% of the overall area (one of the highest levels in England) and the proportion is considerably higher in some central parts. The sandstones of the Wealden rocks are usually acidic, often leading to the development of acidic habitats such as heathland, the largest remaining areas of which are in Ashdown Forest and near Thursley.

Although common in France, the wild boar became extinct in Great Britain by the 17th century, but wild breeding populations have recently returned in the Weald, following escapes from boar farms.

== Culture ==
The Weald has been associated with many writers, particularly in the 19th and early 20th centuries. These include Vita Sackville-West (1892–1962), Sir Arthur Conan Doyle (1859–1930) and Rudyard Kipling (1865–1936). The setting for A.A. Milne's Winnie-the-Pooh stories was inspired by Ashdown Forest, near Milne's country home at Hartfield. John Evelyn (1620–1706), whose family estate was Wotton House on the River Tillingbourne near Dorking, Surrey, was an essayist, diarist, and early author of botany, gardening and geography. The second half of E. M. Forster's A Room with a View takes place at the protagonist's family home, "Windy Corner", in the Weald.

Sir Winston Churchill, British statesman and a prolific writer himself, did much of his writing at his country house, Chartwell, near Westerham, which has extensive views over the Weald. The view from the house was of crucial importance to Churchill; he once remarked, "I bought Chartwell for that view." (Note: Lord Moran, Churchill's physician from 1940 until the latter's death, recorded Chartwell's pull upon his patient, "He loves Chartwell, although there is nothing there except a rather ordinary house - and the Weald.")

== Sport ==
The game of cricket may have originated prior to the 13th century in the Weald. The related game of stoolball is still popular in the Weald; it was originally played mainly by women's teams, but since the formation of the Sussex league at the beginning of the 20th century, it has been played by both men and women.

== Other English wealds and wolds ==
Several other areas in southern England have the name "Weald", including North Weald in Essex, and Harrow Weald in north-west London.

"Wold" is used as the name for various open rolling upland areas in the North of England, including the Yorkshire Wolds and the Lincolnshire Wolds, although these are, by contrast, chalk uplands.

The Cotswolds are a major geographical feature of central England, forming a south-west to north-east line across the country.

== See also ==
- Weald and Downland Open Air Museum
- Recreational walks in Kent
- History of Sussex

== Sources ==
- Brandon, Peter F. (1988). "3B South-eastern England". In Hallam, H. E. (ed.). The Agrarian History of England and Wales. Vol. II: 1042-1350. Cambridge: Cambridge University Press. ISBN 978-0-52-120073-8.
- Brandon, Peter F. (2003). The Kent and Sussex Weald. Chichester: Phillimore. ISBN 978-1-86-077241-2.
- Brooks, Richard (2015). Lewes and Evesham 1264–1265. Simon de Montfort and the Barons' War. Oxford: Osprey Publishing. ISBN 978-1-47-281150-9.
- Ekwall, Eilert (1991). The Concise Oxford Dictionary of English Place Names (4 ed.). OUP. ISBN 0-19-869103-3.
- Gallois, R. W. (1965). British Regional Geology: The Wealden District. London: H.M. Stationery Office. ISBN 0-11-884078-9. OCLC 655080512.
- Hoad, T, ed. (1996). "Weald". The Concise Oxford Dictionary of English Etymology. Oxford University Press.
- Levy, Joel (2010). Scientific Feuds. New Holland Publishers. ISBN 978-1-84-773717-5.
- Locke, Tim (2011). Slow Sussex and the South Downs. Buckinghamshire: Bradt Travel Guides. ISBN 978-1-84-162343-6.
- Moran, Lord (2006). Churchill:The Struggle for Survival 1945-60. New York: Caroll & Graf. ISBN 978-0-78671-706-4.
- Russell, Miles (2012). The Piltdown Man Hoax: Case Closed. Stroud: The History Press. ISBN 978-0-75-248774-8.
- Sawyer, P. F. (1976). "Introduction: Early Medieval English Settlement". In Sawyer, P. F. (ed.). Medieval Settlement: Continuity and Change. London: Edward Arnold. ISBN 978-0-84-481092-8.
- Underdown, D. (2000). Start of Play: Cricket and Culture in Eighteenth Century England. London: Allen Lane. ISBN 978-0-71-399330-1.
- National History Museum (2015). "Igauanodon Teeth". London: Natural History Museum. Archived from the original on 9 September 2015.
