= Richborough Power Station =

Former power station in Kent, England

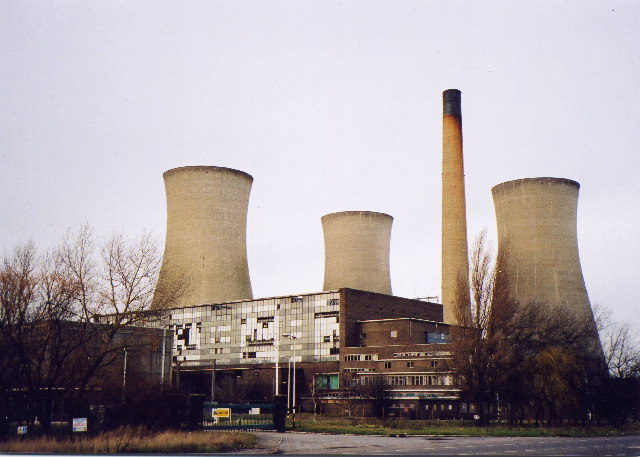
- Country: UK
- Location: Richborough Kent
- Coordinates: 51°18′36″N 1°20′46″E
- Status: Decommissioned and demolished
- Construction began: 1958
- Commission date: 1962
- Decommission date: 1996
- Owners: Central Electricity Generating Board (1962–1996)
- Operator: CEGB

Thermal power station
- Primary fuel: Coal (1962-71), Oil (1971-89), Orimulsion (1989-96)
- Chimneys: 1 (127 metres)
- Cooling towers: Three
- Cooling source: Recirculating water

Power generation
- Units operational: 3 × 120 MW
- Nameplate capacity: 336 MW
- Annual net output: See graph in text

External links
- Commons: Related media on Commons

Richborough Power Station was a 336 MW power station close to the mouth of the River Stour near Sandwich, on the east coast of Kent. It was built on land within the Port of Richborough but being on the northern edge its site lies mostly within the neighbouring parish of Minster, Kent. It operated from 1962 to 1996; the towers were demolished on 11 March 2012. BFL Management Ltd, the current owners of the site plan to bring it back into use as the £750 million Richborough Energy Park.

== History ==
The Central Electricity Generating Board started construction of the power station in 1958, with Unit 1 coming online in December 1962, and Unit 2 following in August 1963. It opened as a 336 MW coal-fired station, using coal from East Kent coalfield and elsewhere.

The maximum total steam capacity of the station boilers was 2,580,000 lb/hr (325 kg/s). Steam pressure and temperature at the turbine stop valves was 1500 psi (103.4 bar) and 538 °C.

From 1964 to 1972 Richborough was one of the CEGB's twenty stations with the highest thermal efficiencies. The thermal efficiency was 30.88% (1964); 32.84% (1965); 33.83% (1966); 33.82% (1967); 32.9% (1968); 32.26% (1969); 32.62% (1970); 32.31% (1971); 32.03% (1972).

It was converted to burn oil in summer 1971 and further converted in 1989 to burn a proprietary oil and water emulsion called Orimulsion, imported from Venezuela through Port Richborough.

The site was also chosen as the site for an experimental 1 MW wind turbine, which was at that time the largest ever installed in the UK, with permission given in 1987, and the turbine becoming live in 1989.

After growing concerns over the environmental effects of the Orimulsion fuel in the main power station, court action was taken in two separate actions, with both cases settled out of court. One of the turbo-alternators was decommissioned in 1994, this reduced the output capability to 228 MW. The station ceased generating electricity in 1996.

=== Electricity output ===
Electricity output from Richborough power station over the period 1963–1987 was as follows.

Richborough annual electricity output GWh

The higher output in 1984/5 reflects the increased use of oil-fired power stations because of limitations on the availability of coal during the 1984-5 miners' strike.

== Demolition ==
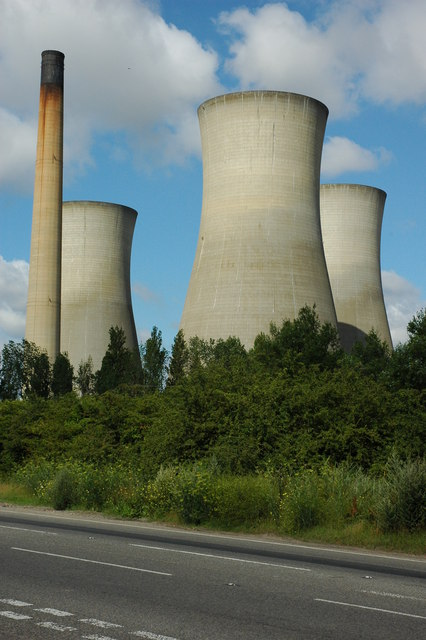
The three cooling towers and chimney of Richborough power station, prior to demolition

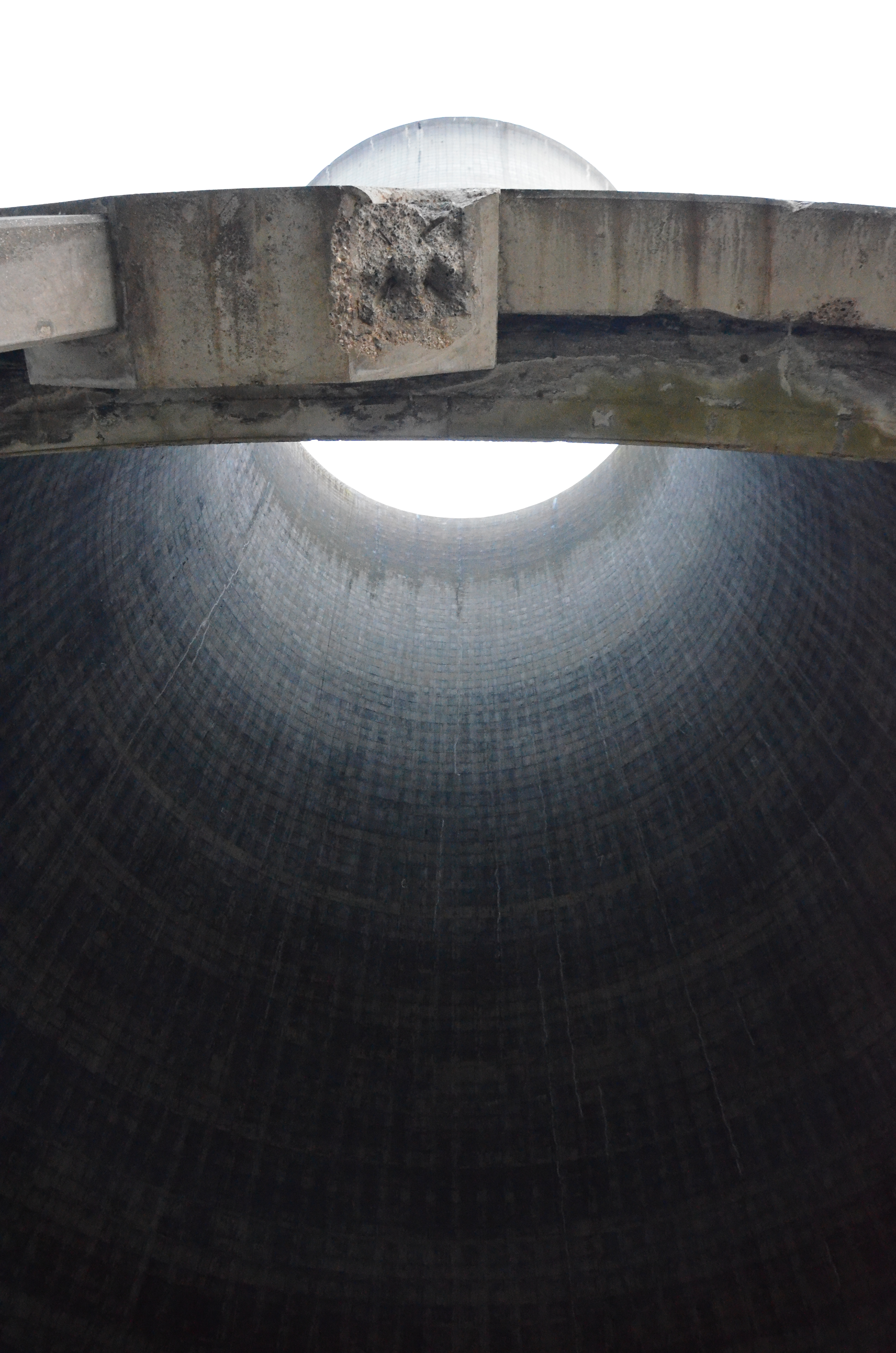
View inside one of the cooling towers

Following the plant closure, the majority of the equipment was removed during a strip out programme, which also saw the demolition of a number of the buildings, leaving only a few outbuildings, the office block and the landmark cooling towers and chimney standing.

In controlled blasts, the three 97m cooling towers and the 127m chimney stack were demolished at 9:07 am on 11 March 2012. Some locals had campaigned to keep the towers, saying they formed part of the historical landscape and were used as a navigation point by boats wanting to enter the mouth of the River Stour, known to have a narrow channel of useful depth. The turbine hall was the last part of the power station to be demolished in 2016.

== Future ==
The current owner of the site, BFL Management Ltd, plan to bring the site back into use as a £750 million green energy park. The national grid interconnector from the original power station is still in place, and is now the grid link for the offshore Thanet Wind Farm.

There are additional plans to create additional recycling and green energy facilities on site, including an anaerobic digester, a waste processing plant, a biomass combined heat and power generator, a pyrolysis plant and a peak demand 30MW diesel generator. When fully operational, the park could provide up to 1,400MW of power, employing 100 full-time equivalent, with up to 500 jobs in the construction phase. National Grid are using part of the site for an interconnector with Belgium. The Nemo Link, fully operational since 31 January 2019, is a 1000MW High Voltage Direct Current (HVDC) 130 km undersea link with the Belgium transmission operator, Elia, to allow power to flow in both directions. This is the third link from the UK National Grid to Europe, the others being the Britned 1000MW link to the Netherlands commissioned in 2011 and the IFA 2000MW link to France commissioned in 1986.

== In popular culture ==
The power station can be seen in several scenes of the 2008 film Son of Rambow, and was the location for the 2003 Channel 4 television series Full Metal Challenge. More recently a brief clip of the demolition of the cooling towers was used by Alter Bridge in their official music video for 'Addicted to Pain' off their 2013 album Fortress. The cooling towers appear in the background scenery of the Royal St. George's Golf Course in the video game WGT Golf, published by World Golf Tour, LLC.
