= Battle of Mercredesburne =

Battle fought in the conquest of the Kingdom of Sussex

Coordinates: 50°55′50″N 0°25′36″E

- Part of the Anglo-Saxon settlement of Britain
Date	485 CE
Location	Unknown, various locations possible
Result	Uncertain

Belligerents
South Britons	South Saxons

Commanders and leaders
Aurelius Ambrosius?	Ælle of Sussex

Strength
Unknown	Unknown

Casualties and losses
Unknown	Unknown

The Battle of Mercredesburne was one of three battles fought as part of the conquest of what became the Kingdom of Sussex in southern England. The battles were fought between the Saxon leader Ælle's army and the local Britons.

The Anglo-Saxon Chronicle, states that Ælle arrived in Sussex with three ships and went on to fight at Cymenshore in 477 CE, Mercredesburne in 485, and Pevensey in 491. Ælle became the first king of the South Saxons. The Kingdom of Sussex was eventually annexed by the Kingdom of Wessex in the 9th century and went on to become the county of Sussex, England.

== Background ==
The legendary foundation of the Kingdom of the South Saxons is provided by the Anglo-Saxon Chronicle, that states that in the year 477 Ælle arrived at a place called Cymenshore with his three sons Cymen, Wlenking, and Cissa. The chronicle describes how on landing Ælle slew the local defenders and drove the remainder into the Forest of Andred and then goes on to describe Ælle's battle with the British in 485 near the bank of Mercredesburne, and his siege of Pevensey in 491 after which the inhabitants were massacred.

The historian and archaeologist, Martin Welch suggests that the area between the Ouse and Cuckmere valleys in Sussex was ceded to the Anglo-Saxons by the British in a treaty settlement. Nennius, a 9th-century Welsh monk and chronicler, describes how the British leader Vortigern arranged to meet Hengest the Anglo-Saxon leader to work out a treaty. Vortigern and three hundred British leaders met with Hengest, supposedly to ratify the treaty, however Hengest's men slaughtered all of Vortigern's companions, after getting them drunk. Vortigern was then coerced into agreeing to a treaty that included the cession of Sussex to the Anglo-Saxons and the suggestion that Mercredesburne means "river of the frontier agreed by treaty" is seen as confirmation of this assertion.

== Battle ==
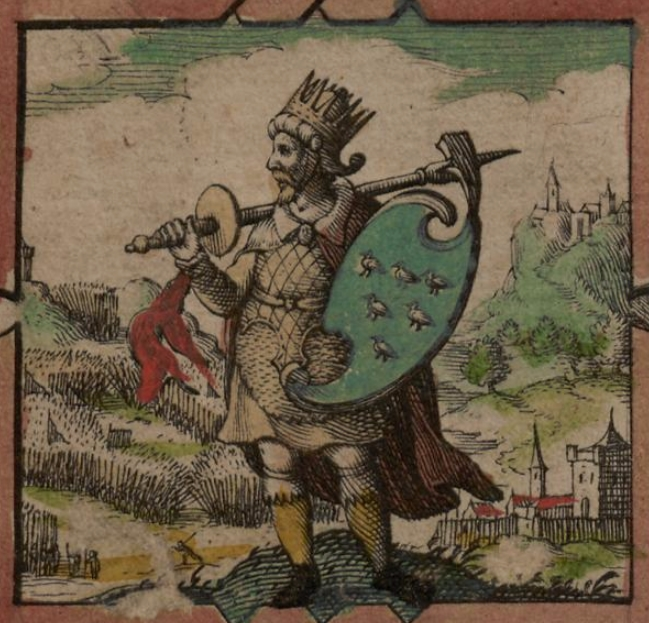
17th century depiction of Ælle

According to the Anglo-Saxon Chronicle of 485, Ælle fought a battle with the British at Mercredesburne. Other versions of the battle have been derived from more elaborate descriptions, such as the one from Henry of Huntingdon, a 12th-century historian's version who suggests that when the army of Ælle and his sons engaged with the Britons neither side won and both sides pledged friendship although after the event the Anglo-Saxons sent a request to the German homelands for more troops.

The 14th century chronicler Roger of Wendover even names the leader of the British forces as Aurelius Ambrosius.

The problem for historians is that the Anglo-Saxon Chronicle was commissioned in the reign of Alfred the Great some four hundred years after the supposed events. There is some evidence that the Anglo-Saxons were using runes at this time. However their culture was largely of an oral tradition and they did not really start writing down legal and historical events until they were evangelised; this would have been the late 7th century for the South Saxons. The early Christian chroniclers would have taken most of their references for the early period from oral sources such as poetry. The medieval historians then produced embroidered versions of the chronicles to suit their own purposes.

== Aftermath ==
The Anglo-Saxon Chronicle does not provide any information on the death of Ælle or his succession, but Henry of Huntingdon suggests that Ælle died as the first king of Sussex in 515 and that he was succeeded by his son Cissa.

== Location ==
The location of the battle is unknown.

The villages of Ashburnham and Penhurst in East Sussex maintain a tradition that a pre-Saxon earthwork known as Town Creep, situated in Creep Wood which adjoins the two villages, was the site of Mercredsburn. Oral tradition surviving to the end of the 19th century referred to the earthwork as being the site of a town which was besieged and destroyed by the Saxons. In 1896 members of The Sussex Archaeological Society investigated this claim, and subsequently published a paper concluding that the earthwork was a possible location for the battle of Mercredsburn, and that the modern name, Town Creep, could have an etymology derived from the latter part of "Mercrede", whilst the "burn" (or stream) may refer to The Ashburn stream running beneath the earthwork.

There is also a possibility that "Mearcredesburnan stede" was at modern Binstead based on the etymology "mære cærses burnan steðe" meaning "the sea landing stage at the watercress stream".

== See also ==
- History of Sussex
