= Ælle of Sussex =

First king of the South Saxons

Ælle
- Ælle's name is visible in this line from the Parker manuscript of the Anglo-Saxon Chronicle, written c. 890

King of Sussex
- Reign: c. 477 – c. 514?
- Successor: Cissa?
- Issue: Cissa, Cymen, Wlencing

Ælle (also Aelle or Ella) is recorded in much later medieval sources as the first king of the South Saxons, reigning in what is now called Sussex, England, from 477 to perhaps as late as 514.

According to the Anglo-Saxon Chronicle, Ælle and three of his sons are said to have landed at a place called Cymensora and fought against the local Britons. The Chronicle goes on to report a victory dated to 491 at Anderitum (present day Pevensey Castle) where the battle ended with the Saxons slaughtering their Brittonic opponents to the last man.

Ælle was the first king recorded by the 8th century chronicler Bede to have held "imperium", or overlordship, over other Anglo-Saxon kingdoms. In the late 9th-century Anglo-Saxon Chronicle (around four hundred years after his time) Ælle is recorded as being the first bretwalda, or "Britain-ruler", though there is no evidence that this was a contemporary title. Ælle's death is not recorded and although he may have been the founder of a South Saxon dynasty, there is no firm evidence linking him with later South Saxon rulers. The 12th-century chronicler Henry of Huntingdon produced an enhanced version of the Anglo-Saxon Chronicle that included 514 as the date of Ælle's death, but this is not secure.

== Historical context ==
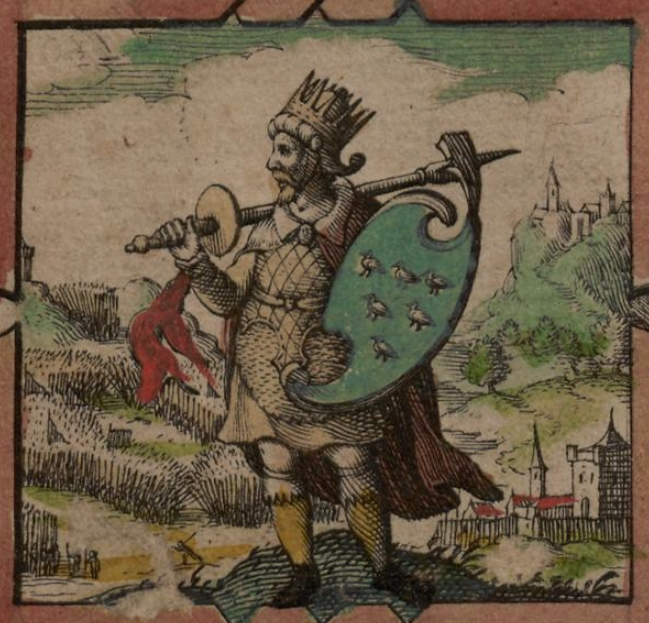
Imaginary depiction of Ælle from John Speed's 1611 "Saxon Heptarchy"

Historians are divided on the detail of Ælle's life and existence as it was during the least-documented period in English history of the last two millennia.

By the early 5th century, Britain had been Roman for over three hundred and fifty years. Amongst the enemies of Roman Britain were the Picts of central and northern Scotland, and the Gaels known as Scoti, who were raiders from Ireland. Also vexatious were the Saxons, the name Roman writers gave to the peoples who lived in the northern part of what is now Germany and the southern part of the Jutland peninsula. Saxon raids on the southern and eastern shores of England had been sufficiently alarming by the late 3rd century for the Romans to build the Saxon Shore forts, and subsequently to establish the role of the Count of the Saxon Shore to command the defence against these incursions. Roman control of Britain finally ended in the early part of the 5th century; the date usually given as marking the end of Roman Britain is 410, when the Emperor Honorius sent letters to the British, urging them to look to their own defence. Britain had been repeatedly stripped of troops to support usurpers' claims to the Roman empire, and after 410 the Roman armies never returned.

Sources for events after this date are extremely scarce, but a tradition, reported as early as the mid-6th century by a British priest named Gildas, records that the British sent for help against the barbarians to Aetius, a Roman consul, probably in the late 440s. No help came. Subsequently, a British leader named Vortigern is supposed to have invited continental mercenaries to help fight the Picts who were attacking from the north. The leaders, whose names are recorded as Hengest and Horsa, rebelled, and a long period of warfare ensued. The invaders—Angles, Saxons, Jutes, and Frisians—gained control of parts of England, but lost a major battle at Mons Badonicus (the location of which is not known). Some authors have speculated that Ælle may have led the Saxon forces at this battle, while others reject the idea out of hand.

The British thus gained a respite, and peace lasted at least until the time Gildas was writing: that is, for perhaps forty or fifty years, from around the end of the 5th century until midway through the sixth. Shortly after Gildas's time, the Anglo-Saxon advance was resumed, and by the late 6th century nearly all of southern England was under the control of the continental invaders.

== Early sources ==
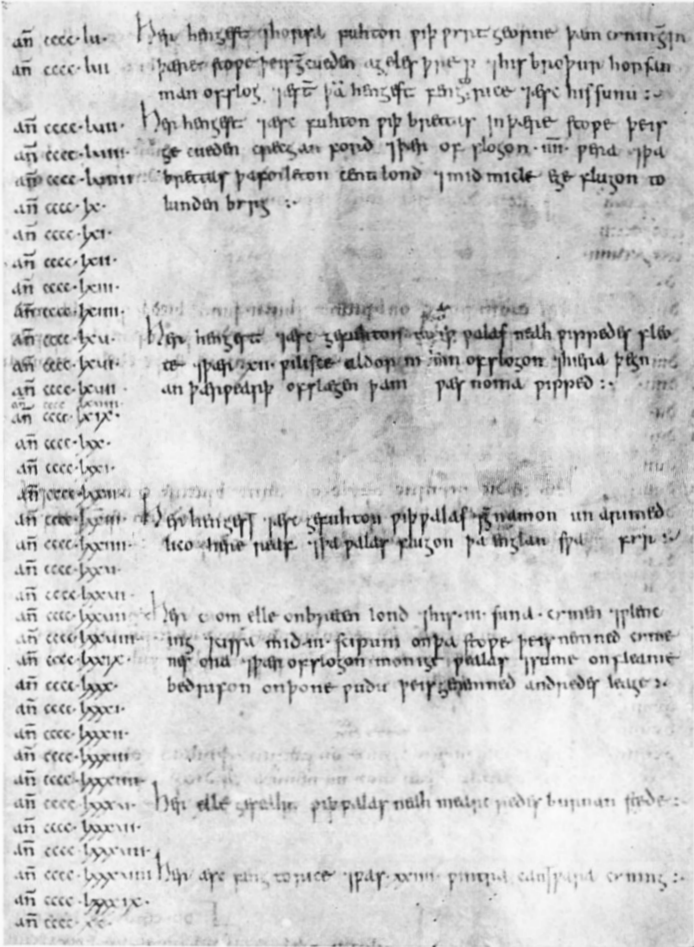
A page from the [A] manuscript of the Anglo-Saxon Chronicle. Ælle's name, spelled "Elle", can be seen in two of the entries at the end of the page. The last entry on the page, for 488, refers to events in Kent and does not mention Ælle.

There are two early sources that mention Ælle by name. The earliest is The Ecclesiastical History of the English People, a history of the English church written in 731 by Bede, a Northumbrian monk. Bede mentions Ælle as one of the Anglo-Saxon kings who exercised what he calls "imperium" over "all the provinces south of the river Humber"; "imperium" is usually translated as "overlordship". Bede gives a list of seven kings who held "imperium", and Ælle is the first of them. The other information Bede gives is that Ælle was not a Christian—Bede mentions a later king, Æthelberht, as "the first to enter the kingdom of heaven".

The second source is the Anglo-Saxon Chronicle, a collection of annals assembled in the Kingdom of Wessex in c. 890, during the reign of Alfred the Great. The Chronicle has three entries for Ælle, from 477 to 491, as follows: (Note: Translations are Michael Swanton's (Anglo-Saxon Chronicle, p. 14), from the A text of the Chronicle; except that Frank M. Stenton's translation (Anglo-Saxon England, pp. 17–18) of part has been substituted to keep "Andredes leag" and "Andredes cester" in the text, for subsequent explanation.)

- 477: Ælle and his 3 sons, Cymen and Wlencing and Cissa, came to the land of Britain with 3 ships at the place which is named Cymen's shore, and there killed many Welsh and drove some to flight into the wood called Andredes leag.
- 485: Here Ælle fought against the Welsh near the margin of Mearcred's Burn.
- 491: Here Ælle and Cissa besieged Andredes cester, and killed all who lived in there; there was not even one Briton left there.

The Chronicle was put together about four hundred years after these events. It is known that the annalists used material from earlier chronicles, as well as from oral sources such as sagas, but there is no way to tell where these lines came from. The terms 'British' and 'Welsh' were used interchangeably, as 'Welsh' is the Saxon word meaning 'foreigner', and was applied to all the native Romano-British of the era.

Three of the places named may be identified:

1. "Cymen's shore" ("Cymenes ora" in the original) is believed to be located at what is now a series of rocks and ledges, in the English Channel off Selsey Bill, on the south coast, known as the Owers. It has been suggested that Ower is derived from the word ora that is found only in placenames where Jutish and West Saxon dialects were in operation (mainly in southern England). It is possible that the stretch of low ground along the coast from Southampton to Bognor was called Ora, "the shore", and that district names were used by the various coastal settlements, Cymens ora being one of them.
2. The wood called "Andredes leag" is the Weald, which at that time was a forest extending from north-west Hampshire all through northern Sussex.
3. "Andredes cester" is thought to be Anderitum, the Saxon Shore fort built by the Roman rebel Carausius in the late 3rd century at Pevensey Castle, just outside the town. Some believe Andredes cester may have been an imperial stronghold somewhere else as Henry of Huntingdon described the place as a fortified city and gave a very full account of the siege which is inconsistent with the geography of ancient Pevensey and little archaeological evidence of sustained settlement there. Also, in his "Britannia", William Camden suggests that it could be Newenden, Kent.

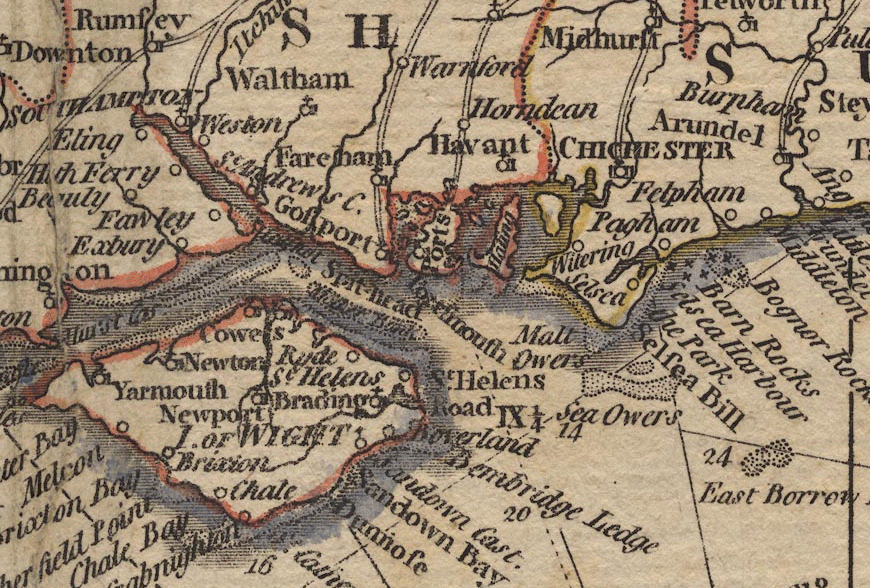
A detail from a 1780 map, showing the Isle of Wight, Selsey Bill, and the Owers shoals to the south. Pevensey is about fifty miles to the east, along the coast.

The Chronicle mentions Ælle once more under the year 827, where he is listed as the first of the eight "bretwaldas", or "Britain-rulers". The list consists of Bede's original seven, plus Egbert of Wessex. There has been much scholarly debate over just what it meant to be a "bretwalda", and the extent of Ælle's actual power in southern England is an open question. It is also noteworthy that there is a long gap between Ælle and the second king on Bede's list, Ceawlin of Wessex, whose reign began in the late 6th century; this may indicate a period in which Anglo-Saxon dominance was interrupted in some way.

Earlier sources than Bede exist which mention the South Saxons, though they do not name Ælle. The earliest reference is still quite late, however, at about 692: a charter of King Nothhelm's, which styles him "King of the South Saxons". Charters are documents which granted land to followers or to churchmen, and which would be witnessed by the kings who had power to grant the land. They are one of the key documentary sources for Anglo-Saxon history, but no original charters survive from earlier than 679.

There are other early writers whose works can shed light on Ælle's time, though they do not mention either him or his kingdom. Gildas's description of the state of Britain in his time is useful for understanding the ebb and flow of the Anglo-Saxon incursions. Procopius, a Byzantine historian, writing not long after Gildas, adds to the meagre sources on population movement by including a chapter on England in one of his works. He records that the peoples of Britain—he names the English, the British, and the Frisians—were so numerous that they were migrating to the kingdom of the Franks in great numbers every year, although this is probably a reference to Britons emigrating to Armorica to escape the Anglo-Saxons. They subsequently gave their name to the area they settled as Brittany, or la petite Bretagne (lit., "little Britain").

== Evidence from place names in Sussex ==
The early dates given in the Anglo-Saxon Chronicle for the colonization of Sussex are supported by an analysis of the place names of the region. The strongest evidence comes from place names that end in "-ing", such as Worthing and Angmering. These are known to derive from an earlier form ending in "-ingas". "Hastings" for example, derives from "Hæstingas" which may mean "the followers or dependents of a person named Hæsta", although others suggest the heavily Romanised region may have had names of Gallo-Roman origin derived from "-ienses". From west of Selsey Bill to east of Pevensey can be found the densest concentration of these names anywhere in Britain. There are a total of about forty-five place names in Sussex of this form, but personal names either were not associated with these places or fell out of use.

The preservation of Ælle's sons in Old English place names is unusual. (Note: The Anglo Saxon Chronicle suggests that Ælle's three sons Cissa, Wlencing and Cymen gave their names to Chichester, Lancing and Cymen sora.) The names of the founders, in other origin legends, seem to have British or Latin roots not Old English. It is likely that the foundation stories were actually known before the 9th century, but the annalists manipulated them to provide a common origin for the new regime. The origin stories purported that the British were defeated and replaced by invading Anglo-Saxons arriving in small ships. These stories were largely believed right up to the 19th century, but are now regarded as myths.

== Reign ==
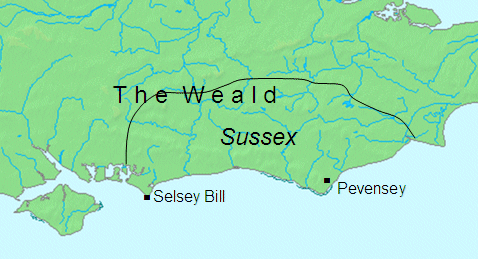
A map of south-eastern England showing places visited by Ælle, according to the Anglo-Saxon Chronicle, and the area of modern Sussex

If the dates given by the Anglo-Saxon Chronicle are accurate to within half a century, then Ælle's reign lies in the middle of the Anglo-Saxon expansion, and prior to the final conquest of the Britons. It also seems consistent with the dates given to assume that Ælle's battles predate Mons Badonicus.This in turn would explain the long gap, of fifty or more years, in the succession of the "bretwaldas": if the peace gained by the Britons did indeed hold till the second half of the 6th century, it is not to be expected that an Anglo-Saxon leader should have anything resembling overlordship of England during that time. The idea of a pause in the Anglo-Saxon advance is also supported by the account in Procopius of 6th century migration from Britain to the kingdom of the Franks. Procopius's account is consistent with what is known to be a contemporary colonization of Armorica (now Brittany, in France); the settlers appear to have been at least partly from Dumnonia (modern Cornwall), and the area acquired regions known as Dumnonée and Cornouaille. It seems likely that something at that time was interrupting the general flow of the Anglo-Saxons from the continent to Britain.

The dates for Ælle's battles are also reasonably consistent with what is known of events in the kingdom of the Franks at that time. Clovis I united the Franks into a single kingdom during the 480s and afterwards, and the Franks' ability to exercise power along the southern coast of the English channel may have diverted Saxon adventurers to England rather than the continent.

It is possible, therefore, that a historical king named Ælle existed, who arrived from the continent in the late 5th century, and who conquered much of what is now Sussex. He may have been a prominent war chief with a leadership role in a federation of Anglo-Saxon groups fighting for territory in Britain at that time. This may be the origin of the reputation that led Bede to list him as holding overlordship over southern Britain. The battles listed in the Chronicle are compatible with a conquest of Sussex from west to east, against British resistance stiff enough to last fourteen years. His area of military control may have extended as far as Hampshire and north to the upper Thames valley, but it certainly did not extend across all of England south of the Humber, as Bede asserts.

The historian Guy Halsall argues that as Ælle immediately preceded a sequence of three contemporaries from the late sixth-century in Bede's original list (Ceawlin of Wessex, Æthelberht of Kent, and Rædwald of East Anglia), it is far more likely that Ælle dates to the mid sixth century, and that the Chronicle has moved his dates back a century in order to provide a foundation myth for Sussex which puts it chronologically and geographically between the origins of the kingdoms of Kent and Wessex.

== Death and burial ==
Ælle's death is not recorded by the Chronicle, which gives no information about him, or his sons, or the South Saxons until 675, when the South Saxon king Æthelwalh was baptized.

It has been conjectured that, as Saxon war leader, Ælle may have met his death in the disastrous battle of Mount Badon when the Britons halted Saxon expansion. If Ælle died within the borders of his own kingdom then it may well have been that he was buried on Highdown Hill with his weapons and ornaments in the usual mode of burial among the South Saxons. Highdown Hill is the traditional burial-place of the kings of Sussex.

== See also ==
- Timeline of conflict in Anglo-Saxon Britain

== Primary sources ==
- Bede (1991). D.H. Farmer (ed.). Ecclesiastical History of the English People. Translated by Leo Sherley-Price. Revised by R.E. Latham. London: Penguin. ISBN 0-14-044565-X.
- Swanton, Michael (1996). The Anglo-Saxon Chronicle. New York: Routledge. ISBN 0-415-92129-5.

== Secondary sources ==
- Camden, William (1701). Britannia Vol 2 Updated English version. London: Joseph Wild.
- Campbell, James; John, Eric; Wormald, Patrick (1991). The Anglo-Saxons. London: Penguin Books. ISBN 0-14-014395-5.
- Fletcher, Richard (1989). Who's Who in Roman Britain and Anglo-Saxon England. London: Shepheard-Walwyn. ISBN 0-85683-089-5.
- Gelling, Margaret (2000). Place-Names in the Landscape. London: Phoenix. ISBN 1-84212-264-9.
- Halsall, Guy (2013). Worlds of Arthur: Facts & Fictions of the Dark Ages. Oxford, UK: Oxford University Press. ISBN 978-0-19-870084-5.
- Heron-Allen, Edward (1911). Selsey Historic and Prehistoric. London: Duckworth.
- Hunter Blair, Peter (1960). An Introduction to Anglo-Saxon England. Cambridge: Cambridge University Press. pp. 13–16.
- Hunter Blair, Peter (1966). Roman Britain and Early England: 55 B.C. – A.D. 871. New York: W.W. Norton & Company. ISBN 0-393-00361-2.
- Henry of Huntingdon (1996). Greenway, Diana E. (ed.). Historia Anglorum: the history of the English. Oxford: OUP. ISBN 0-19-822224-6.
- Kelly, S. E., ed. (1998). Anglo-Saxon Charters VI, Charters of Selsey. OUP for the British Academy. ISBN 0-19-726175-2.
- Kirby, D.P. (1992). The Earliest English Kings. London: Routledge. ISBN 0-415-09086-5.
- NIMA (2004). Pub. 194 Sailing Directions(Enroute) English Channel. 11th edition. ProStar Publications, Inc. ISBN 1-57785-564-7.
- Stenton, Frank M. (1971). Anglo-Saxon England. Oxford: Clarendon Press. ISBN 0-19-821716-1.
- Welch, M.G. (1978). "Early Anglo-Saxon Sussex". In Brandon, Peter (ed.). The South Saxons. Chichester: Phillimore. ISBN 0-85033-240-0.
- Welch, M. G. (1992). Anglo-Saxon England. English Heritage. ISBN 0-7134-6566-2.
- Yorke, Barbara (2008). "Anglo-Saxon Origin Legends". In Barrow, Julia; Wareham, Andrew (eds.). Myth, Rulership, Church and Charters. London: Routledge. ISBN 978-0-75465120-8.
