= Richborough Energy Park =

Coordinates: 51.3106091°N 1.3446422°E

Richborough Energy Park is a site of non-traditional power generation, on the site of the former Richborough power station close to the mouth of the River Stour near Sandwich, on the east coast of Kent, England.

== Site history ==
The original Richborough power station operated from 1962 to 1996, with final demolition being undertaken in 2012. It originally burnt coal, but later converted to oil and that to the burning of Orimulsion.

The station was also the site of an experimental wind turbine in 1989, which at 1MW was the biggest then installed anywhere in the United Kingdom.

== Current use ==
The national grid interconnector from the original power station is still in place and is now the grid link for the offshore Thanet Wind Farm.

The site is the landing site for the ±400 kV 1,000 MW HVDC power cable from Belgium called Nemo Link, built by Siemens, which entered commercial service on 31 January 2019.

== Plans ==
The current owner of the site, BFL Management Ltd, plan to bring the site back into use as a £750 million green energy park. There are additional plans to create additional recycling and green energy facilities on site, including an anaerobic digester, a waste processing plant, a biomass combined heat and power generator, a pyrolysis plant and a peak demand 30MW diesel generator. As of 2023-24 a battery storage facility was in process of being constructed, part of this was operational in January 2024. When fully operational, the park could provide up to 1,400MW of power, employing 100 full-time equivalents, with up to 500 jobs in the construction phase.
