= Battle of Wippedesfleot =

466 battle

Coordinates: 51.314°N 1.352°E

- Part of the Anglo-Saxon settlement of Britain
Date	c. 465 CE
Location	Ebbsfleet, Kent
Result	Anglo-Saxon victory

Belligerents
Britons	Anglo-Saxons

Commanders and leaders
Unknown	Hengest; Oisc

The Battle of Wippedesfleot took place in or around 465 CE between the Anglo-Saxons (or Jutes), said to have been led by Hengest, and the Britons.

The battle is described in the Anglo-Saxon Chronicle thus:

465: Her Hengest 7 Æsc gefuhton uuiþ Walas neah Wippedesfleote 7 þær .xii. wilisce aldormenn ofslogon, 7 hiera þegn an þær wearþ ofslægen, þam wæs noma Wipped.
465: This year Hengist and Æsc fought against the Welsh near Wippidsfleet, [Ebbsfleet?] and there slew twelve Welsh ealdormen, and one of their own thanes was slain there, whose name was Wipped.

This battle is said to have resulted in much bloodshed and slaughter on both sides, to the extent that hostilities abated for a while thereafter. Some historians believe in a Saxon victory, but that is not what is mentioned in the text. The limited number of casualties is an indication that the battle was a small one. The number of warriors involved must not have reached 200 men.

Wippedesfleot is thought to be Ebbsfleet in Kent, near Ramsgate. Its location made the author of the Historia Brittonum think that all Saxons had now been driven out of Britain. Wippedes is possibly a corruption of Latin oppidis in reference to the creek's position by the twin forts of Rutupiæ and Rutupiæ alteræ (Regulbium). Ramsgate is the main place upon the former Island of Thanet, "which was given to the Saxons by Vortigern". It was the very place where, according to the Historia Brittonum, the Saxons first landed. Ramsgate is on the North East coast of Kent. Ebbsfleet is close to Pegwell Bay, not to be confused with Ebbsfleet near Gravesend.

The only contemporary Brittonic source, the De Excidio et Conquestu Britanniae of Gildas, does not mention the battle specifically, instead reporting that "sometimes our countrymen, sometimes the enemy, won the field" until the Battle of Badon.
