= Nemo Link =

Electrical interconnector between the UK and Belgium

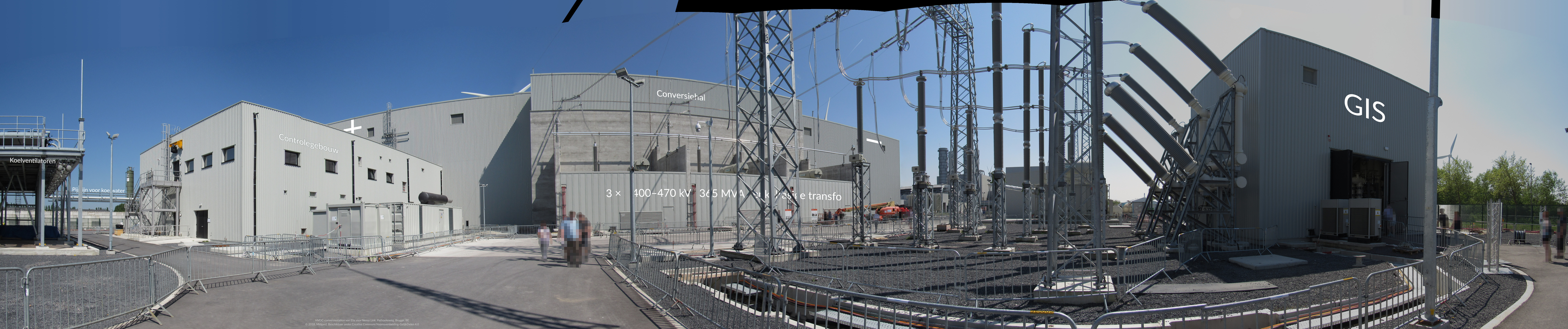
- Conversion station in Bruges
- Map of Nemo Link

Location
- Country: Belgium; United Kingdom
- From: Zeebrugge, Belgium
- Passes through: North Sea
- To: Richborough, Kent, England

Ownership information
- Partners: Elia System Operator; National Grid plc

Construction information
- Cable manufacturer: J-Power Systems Corporation
- Cable installer: J-Power Systems Corporation, DeepOcean
- Substation manufacturer: Siemens
- Substation installer: Siemens
- Commissioned: 31 January 2019

Technical information
- Type: submarine cable
- Current type: HVDC
- Total length: 140 km (87 mi)
- Capacity: 1,000 MW
- DC voltage: 400 kV

Nemo Link is a 1,000 MW HVDC submarine power cable between Richborough Energy Park in Kent, the United Kingdom and Zeebrugge, Belgium. The project is a joint venture between British National Grid and Belgian Elia. The 400 kV electrical interconnector is the first between the two countries, with an annual transmission capacity of 8.76 TWh. The link has been fully operational since 31 January 2019, and has transported 29 TWh during its first 5 years; 24.75 TWh to the UK and 4.25 to Belgium with an availability above 99%.

== History ==
In 2015, contracts totalling €500 million were awarded to Siemens for the construction of the two onshore HVDC converter stations and to J-Power Systems Corporation for the cable system. The contract for the laying of the actual cable was awarded to DeepOcean who completed the work in 2017 and 2018.

== Route ==
The total cable length is 140 km (87 miles) of which 130 kilometres (81 mi) is under water, buried at a depth of up to 60 metres (200 ft). The offshore section runs from Pegwell Bay on the UK side to Zeebrugge beach in Belgium. The onshore cable in Belgium is nearly 9 km (5.6 miles) long and connects the landing point of the submarine cable in Zeebrugge beach to the converter station in Herdersbrug. In the United Kingdom there is 2 km (1.2 miles) of land cable from Pegwell Bay to the Richborough converter station.

== See also ==
- HVDC Cross-Channel, 2,000 MW between UK and France
- BritNed, 1,000 MW between UK and the Netherlands
