= Sevenscore =

Coordinates: 51.33°N 1.3468°E

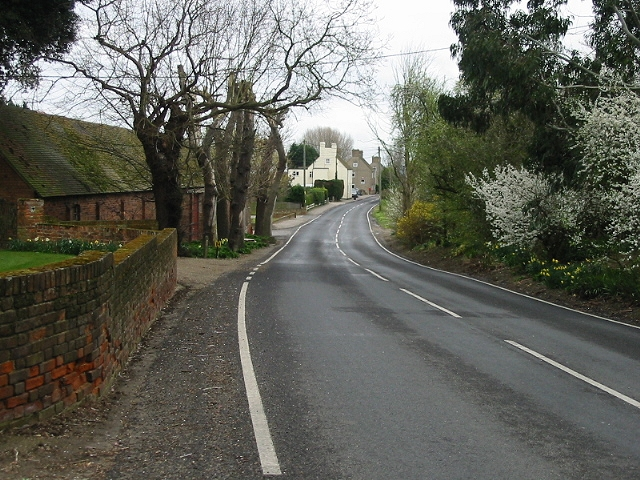

- Location within Kent
- OS grid reference: TR3364
- Civil parish: Minster
- District: Thanet
- Shire county: Kent
- Region: South East
- Country: England
- Sovereign state: United Kingdom
- Post town: Ramsgate
- Postcode district: CT12
- Police: Kent
- Fire: Kent
- Ambulance: South East Coast
- UK Parliament: Herne Bay and Sandwich

Sevenscore is a hamlet on the B2048 secondary road about one mile (1.6 km) east of Minster-in-Thanet in Kent, England. It is in the civil parish of Minster-in-Thanet.

It is among, and associated with, the other hamlet settlements in west Thanet.

Sevenscore Farm is a large presence in the hamlet and specialises in asparagus crops.
