= Cissa of Sussex =

Cissa
- Artist's impression of three Saxon ships

King of Sussex?
- Reign: 514–567?
- Predecessor: Ælle
- Successor: Æðelwealh
- Issue: Unknown

Cissa (/ˈtʃɪsɑː/) was part of an Anglo-Saxon invasion force that landed in three ships at a place called Cymensora in AD 477. The invasion was led by Cissa's father Ælle and included his two brothers. They are said to have fought against the local Britons. Their conquest of what became Sussex, England continued when they fought a battle on the margins of Mecredesburne in 485 and Pevensey in 491 where they are said to have slaughtered their opponents to the last man.

The main source for this story is the Anglo-Saxon Chronicle, a series of annals written in the vernacular Old English. The Anglo Saxon Chronicle was commissioned in the reign of Alfred the Great some 400 years after the landing at Cymenshore. One of the purposes of the chronicle was to provide genealogies of the West Saxon kings. Although a lot of the facts provided by the chronicle can be verified, the foundation story of Sussex involving Ælle and his three sons can not. It is known that Anglo-Saxons did settle in eastern Sussex during the fifth century, but not in the west where Cymensora was probably situated.

The city of Chichester, whose placename is first mentioned in the Anglo-Saxon Chronicle, of AD 895, is supposedly named after Cissa.

== Historical attestation ==
The Anglo-Saxon Chronicle lists Cissa as one of the three sons of Ælle, who in the year 477 arrived in Britain at a place called Cymenshore (traditionally thought to have been in the Selsey area of Sussex). The Chronicle recounts that Ælle and his three sons fought three battles: at Cymenshore in 477, one near the banks of Mercredesburne in 485 and lastly one at Pevensey in 491, where (the Chronicle claims) all Britons were slaughtered. The Anglo-Saxon Chronicle was originally compiled in Winchester, the capital of Wessex, and completed in 891. It was then distributed to various monasteries throughout the country for copying. The different versions were then updated periodically. The chronicle charts Anglo-Saxon history from the mid-fifth century until 1154. Before the Norman Conquest of 1066 the manuscripts were mainly written in Old English; post-Conquest the scribes tended to use Latin. The original Chronicle was commissioned during the rule of Alfred the Great r. 871–899 over 400 years after Cissa, and historians regard the accuracy of the events and dates listed during the fifth century as questionable. The sources for the fifth century annals are obscure, however an analysis of the text demonstrates some poetic conventions, so it is probable that the narrative derived from an oral tradition, such as sagas in the form of epic poems. The Anglo-Saxon Chronicle was commissioned for a number of reasons, including propaganda—it provided genealogies of the kings of Wessex, showing them in a positive light. (Wessex had absorbed the Kingdom of Sussex, founded by Ælle, during the reign of Egbert of Wessex r. 802–839.)

No known archaeological evidence supports the existence of Ælle and his three sons in the Chichester or Selsey area. The absence of early Anglo-Saxon burial-grounds in the Chichester area indicates that the Saxons did not arrive there until more than a hundred years after Ælle's traditional lifetime; Some have proposed that Chichester had an independent region of Britons (known as Sub-Roman) in the late fifth century, but no archaeological or placename evidence supports that hypothesis either. Furthermore, only two early Anglo-Saxon objects have been found west of the River Arun and they can be firmly dated to the sixth century, rather later than Ælle's time. One of those objects was a small long brooch from the Roman cemetery, in the St. Pancras area of Chichester. Its isolation suggests that it belonged to a Saxon woman who lived and died in a British community rather than in a Saxon settlement.

No written Anglo-Saxon sources claim that Cissa was ever king. The 8th-century chronicler Bede stated that Ælle was the first king to have held imperium, or overlordship, over other Anglo-Saxon kingdoms, but he makes no mention of Ælle's sons. The earliest source that does state that Cissa was king is that of the Anglo-Norman chronicler, Henry of Huntingdon, who wrote between 1130 and 1154, and clearly used his imagination to fill out gaps in the historical record. Henry of Huntingdon derived a lot of his information from Bede. The 13th-century chronicler Roger of Wendover used Henry's work as his main source and it is probable that both Henry and Roger had access to information from manuscripts and oral sources now lost. Both Henry of Huntingdon and Roger of Wendover provide extended versions of the three Anglo-Saxon Chronicle entries relating to Ælle and his sons. It is assumed by both authors that Ælle was succeeded by his "son" Cissa – as is the alleged date of this "succession". Roger of Wendover even went so far as to provide a death date for Cissa, that had previously been absent. The date he gave was 590, which, given that Cissa is supposed to have arrived in Britain in 477, means that he must have been at least 123 years old when he died. An emendation from "died in 590", to "died aged 90" would resolve this inconsistency. As Kirby & Williams observed, "[i]t seems very unlikely that these annals in later medieval chronicles will provide a certain basis for historical reconstruction".

== Evidence from place names ==
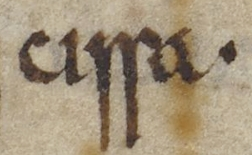
A mention of Cissa, Ælle's son, in the Anglo-Saxon Chronicle

The early part of the Anglo Saxon Chronicle contains the frequent use of eponyms. The chronicle's entry for 477 names Ælle's sons as Cymen, Wlenking, and Cissa. All three of Ælle's 'sons' have names "which conveniently link to ancient or surviving place-names". Cymenshore, the landing place where the invasion started, is named after Cymen, Lancing after Wlenking and Chichester after Cissa. Conceivably the names of Ælle's sons were derived from the place-names as the legends of the origins of the South Saxons evolved; or perhaps the legends themselves gave rise to the place-names.

Another place name potentially associated with Cissa (pronounced 'Chissa') is the Iron Age hill fort Cissbury Ring, near Cissbury, which William Camden said "plainly bespeaks it the work of king Cissa". The association of Cissbury with Cissa is a 16th-century antiquarian invention. Records show that Cissbury was known as Sissabury in 1610, Cesars Bury in 1663, Cissibury in 1732 and Sizebury in 1744. A local tradition suggests that the camp was built and named after Cæsar. It is thought possible that Cissbury was used in the late Anglo-Saxon period, during the reigns of Ethelred II and Cnut as a mint. Old Iron Age forts were used as mints, during dangerous times, such as when there were frequent Viking raids. However, there has been no archaeological confirmation of Cissbury being occupied by Anglo-Saxons.

== See also ==
- History of Sussex
