= Cymenshore =

Lost place in Southern England

Cymenshore was a place in Southern England where, according to the Anglo-Saxon Chronicle, Ælle of Sussex landed in AD 477 and battled the Britons with his three sons Cymen, Wlencing and Cissa, after the first of whom Cymenshore was held to have been named. The spelling Cymenshore is a scholarly modernisation of the Old English Cȳmenes ōra, which is now lost. Its location is unclear but was probably near Selsey.

== Etymology ==
The earliest surviving manuscript to contain the name is the late ninth-century Manuscript A of the Anglo-Saxon Chronicle, which gives it in the form Cymenesora. Outside the Chronicle, what is generally believed to be the same name is next attested in a thirteenth-century manuscript: this includes a copy of a charter adapted from a charter issued in 957, which gives the form on Cymeneres horan and also a copy of a forged charter purporting to date from 673 but perhaps originally composed in the tenth century, which gives the form in Cumeneshore. These and other spellings in late manuscripts (Cymensora, Cumenshore and Cimeneres horan) are generally accepted by scholars to derive from an Old English place-name, now lost, whose Old English form was Cȳmenes ōra.

The West Saxon past participle cumen, meaning “come” or “having come,” provides a plausible origin for the name Cymen (or Cuman), though its literal sense makes it unlikely as a conventional birth-name. Beyond the simple notion of arrival, cumen could carry extended meanings such as achievement, attainment, or successful completion of an enterprise, making it appropriate as a descriptive or triumphal designation. In Old English practice, unusual or aspirational names were sometimes applied under exceptional circumstances—for example, Unwēn (“beyond expectation”)—but a more compelling interpretation for Cymenes ōra is as a leadership or honorific title, conferred on a figure whose success in colonization or conquest warranted commemoration. Analogous patterns are evident elsewhere: the sons of Port Victor, Bieda and Mægla, bear names celebrating accomplishment rather than inheritance, reflecting a wider tendency to memorialize achievement. This mirrors Roman practices in which victorious generals received epithets such as Africanus or Gothicus, appended to their tria nomina. In early English systems, where individuals typically bore a single name, such triumphal titles could supplant the birth-name. The independent attestation of Cymenes denu (Little Bedwyn, S264, 778 AD) confirms that Cymen functioned as a recognized personal-name element in contemporary practice. Taken together, this evidence suggests that Cymenes ōra plausibly reflects either a West Saxon derivation from cumen (“Come”) or a leadership title commemorating achievement, rather than a fabricated or inherited name.

The first element of Cȳmenes ōra is thought to be an Old English personal name that in proto-Old English would have had the form *Cȳmīn, deriving from the same root as the later Old English adjective cȳme ("handsome, comely") combined with the diminutive suffix *-īn, in the genitive case. Although in early Old English this name took the form *Cȳmīn, by the eighth century, the -n had been lost: the Anglo-Saxon Chronicle talks about a person called Cymen not because that was a form of the name current in the ninth century (the form then current was Cȳme) but because a scribe inferred the form of the person's name from the more archaic place-name.

The reconstruction of Cȳmenes ōra from Cȳmīn (“handsome, comely”) is speculative: the adjective cȳme is extremely rare and unattested in personal names, and the Chronicle’s Cymen likely reflects a scribe’s inference rather than contemporary usage. A more plausible origin is the West Saxon past participle cumen (“come”), which could function as a triumphal or leadership title, commemorating achievement rather than a conventional birth-name.

Like several other Old English words that are found in place-names (prominently wīc from Latin vīcus, port from portūs and funta from fons), the second element of Cȳmenes ōra is an Old English word that was probably a loan-word from Latin. The Latin word ōra meant "border, brim, edge, margin, end, boundary", and was used amongst other things to denote coastline. In Old English, this word had two quite different senses: "shore, foreshore" and (possibly deriving from the former meaning) "a hill shaped like an upturned canoe, featuring a long tract of flat land along the top, with a rounded shoulder at one or both ends". It is possible that the stretch of low ground along the coast from Southampton to Bognor was called ōra "the shore", and that district names including that word were used by the various coastal settlements, such as Ower near Southampton, Rowner near Gosport, Copnor in Portsmouth, Marker in West Thorney, Itchenor, Chalder Farm, Keynor Farm, Honer in Pagham, Bognor—and potentially Cȳmenes ōra.

== Role in foundation myths ==
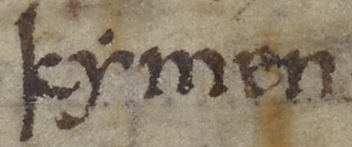
A mention of Cymen, Ælle's son, in the Anglo-Saxon Chronicle

The account of Ælle and his three sons landing at Cymenshore in 477 appears in the common stock of the Anglo-Saxon Chronicle, a body of material compiled and composed in the ninth century, some 400 years or more after the supposed events.

The legendary foundation of Saxon Sussex, by Ælle, is likely to have originated in an oral tradition before being recorded in the Anglo-Saxon Chronicle. (Note: ASC 477 - Her cuom Ęlle on Bretenlond 7 his .iii. suna, Cymen 7 Wlencing 7 Cissa, mid .iii. scipum on þa stowe þe is nemned Cymenesora, 7 þær ofslogon monige Wealas 7 sume on fleame bedrifon on þone wudu þe is genemned Andredesleage.) (Note: The account marks the beginning of Saxon Sussex.) According to the Chronicle, Cymenshore is named after Cymen, one of Ælle's sons; some historians, however, have concluded that this figure was invented by scholars in the Chronicle tradition from the place-name and that the actions attributed to him have no historical basis.

From the collapse of Roman administration in Britain until the embedding of Christianity among the English during the seventh century, there is a dearth of surviving written material. This lack of primary sources has made it difficult for historians to verify or disprove the Chronicle's account of Ælle's invasion. The preservation of Ælle's sons in Old English place names is unusual. The names of some founding figures in other origin legends in the Chronicle seem to come from Brittonic. It is likely that the foundation stories were known before the ninth century, but that annalists manipulated them to provide a common origin for ninth-century Wessex. These myths purport that the British were defeated and replaced by invading Anglo-Saxons arriving in small ships. These origin stories were largely believed right up to the nineteenth century.

== Location ==
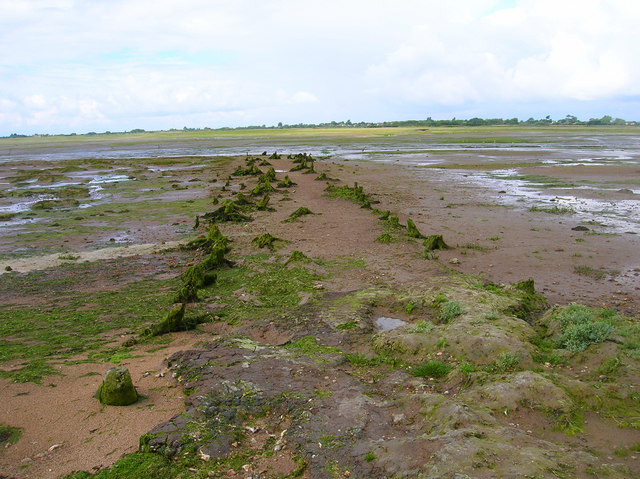
Remains of jetty at Wytherings location(grid reference SZ8797)

The location for Cȳmenes ōra is traditionally identified with Selsey Bill, a tradition based on a place called Cumenshora in the boundary clause of an Anglo-Saxon charter. There is no archaeological or historical evidence for the settlement of Anglo-Saxons in the Selsey/Chichester area before the sixth century. Archaeological evidence does support the settlement of Saxons in East Sussex during the fifth century and Jutish settlement, also datable to the fifth century, West of Chichester, in neighbouring Hampshire around the Meon Valley.

=== Evidence for Selsey area ===
Section of 1583 Dutch map showing Rumbridge (Weenbrug).

The Selsey area, is traditionally the most popular candidate for Cymenshore. The tradition is based largely on two charters that refer to a place with a similar name in the boundary clause to that cited in the Anglo-Saxon Chronicle. The charter that defined the land award to Wilfrid at Selsey, in the 7th century, by King Caedwalla is actually a 10th-century forgery (Note: Patrick Wormald suggests in his essay "The Strange Affair of the Selsey Bishopric 953-963" that the See of Winchester had removed lands from the Selsey Bishopric previously endowed to Wilfrid by Caedwalla. The forged charter was produced to support Selsey's claim to retrieve them.) The relevant section of the forged charter, says (in Latin):

Ab introitu portus qui appellatur Anglice Wyderinges, post retractum mare in Cumeneshore, sic uersus occidentalem plagam iuxta mare usque Rumbruge, ...

— Kelly 1998, pp. 3–13

and the translation is:

from the entrance of the harbour which is called in English Wyderinges round where the sea falls back at Cumenshore then towards the western shore at Rumbruge ...

— Richardson 2000, p. 57

A further source is from the Charter of Byrhthelm (presumably Brihthelm, bishop of Selsey), which is believed to be genuine and is to do with some land that had been seized from the See of Selsey, it confirms that the boundary is from Wytherings Mouth (Note: The Port of Wythering was a settlement at the mouth of what is now Pagham Harbour. It was overrun by the sea in the 13th century and Pagham Harbour eventually silted up and ceased to be navigable, except for small craft.) and Cymenshoran in the east to Hormouth in the west:

Þis sinde þat land gemeare to Selesie. Arest æt Wedering muðe, þa be sæ on Cymeneres horan, swa west be sæ oð Ðribeorgas, forð be stronde to cwuenstane 7 forð be strande on Horemuðen..

— Kelly 1998, pp. 85–91

These are the land-boundaries of Selsey, firstly at Withering, thence by sea to the Owers, west by sea to Rumbridge; on by beach to queen's stone and on by beach to Hormouth..

— Barker 1949, p. 85

Rumbruge/Rumbridge (alias "thri beorg" – three barrows, now the Medmerry Bank) is believed to have been an islet and trading port off the southwest coast of the Manhood Peninsula, that has long since succumbed to the sea and Wytherings mouth was part of what is now Pagham Harbour. (Note: The starting place was 'three barrows' (thri, beorg), which gave rise to the lost placename Rumbridge, thought to be between Medmerry and Wittering.")

=== The Owers ===
Just off the tip of Selsey Bill, to approximately 11 kilometres (6.8 miles) SSE, are groups of ledges and rocks known as the Owers. (Note: The modern distances were based on the location of Selsey Bill being 50° 43′ 21.62″ N, 0° 47′ 16.77″ W, Outer Owers Light Beacon 50º38.59N 0º41.09W)

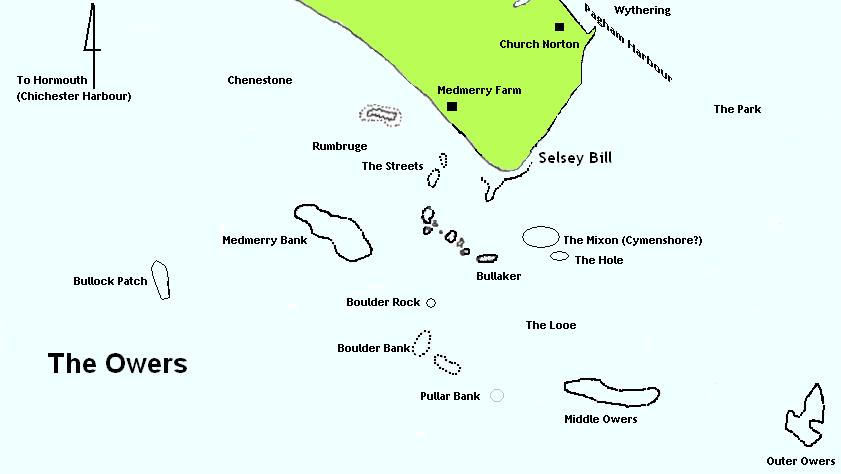
The Owers showing possible location for Cymenshore

==== Outer and Middle Owers ====
Some historians such as Hunter-Blair identify the Outer Owers and Middle Owers as the landing place for Ælle. This is problematic, however, as according to SCOPAC the coastal erosion pattern means that this section of the Owers would not have been part of the shoreline for at least 5000 years. (Note: The Southern Coastal Group (SCG) and Standing Conference on Problems Associated with the Coastline (SCOPAC) is the Regional Coastal Group for central southern England. Originally formed as separate groups SCOPAC (est. 1986) and SCG (est. 2008) the two organisations merged in 2020. The membership consists of local authorities, the Environment agency and others.) The Outer Owers are approximately 11 kilometres (6.8 miles) off Selsey Bill and the erosion pattern suggests that the shore would have been 2–3 kilometres (1.2–1.9 mi) seaward 5000 years ago.

==== The Mixon ====
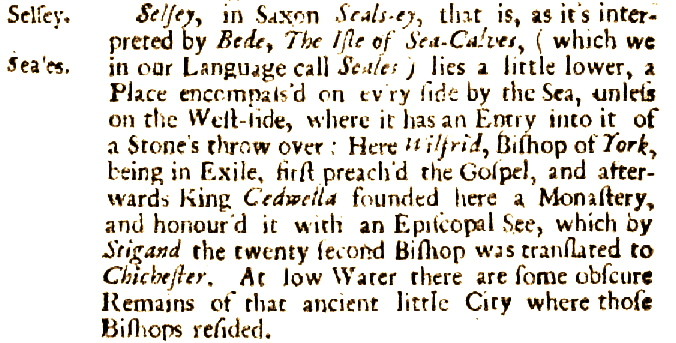
Camden's description of Selsey and the ancient little City (Note: In this Isle there are some obscure remains of that ancient little city, in which those Bishops resided, cover'd at high water, but plainly visible at low water -William Camden.)

To the south of Selsey Bill lies the Mixon rocks.

Selsey Bill was part of the Chichester Iron-Age oppidum. The centre was superseded by the Romano-British Belgic tribal civitas at Chichester. Evidence for Selsey’s past importance is provided by the many Atrebatean coins that have been discovered along the Selsey shoreline over the years. The quantity of coins and the discovery of waste gold found have suggested that there was a tribal mint at Selsey, the only other mint for this tribe was at Silchester.

As the Mixon, south of Selsey Bill, would have been within the old oppidum's territory, W.A.R. Richardson speculates that it could be the site of Cidade Celha (the Old City) and therefore Cȳmenes ōra. The archaeological evidence demonstrates that the Mixon would have been the shoreline during the Roman occupation, with it not being breached by the sea until the 10th or 11th century. (Note: "A Roman wall, a quarry, a standing stone and a presumed Roman lighthouse have all been reported by divers in the vicinity of the Mixon rock."Ruins of an old Roman fort and also ballista ammunition have been found at the site."Barrier breaching and shoreline recession associated with rising sea-level and storm events caused The Mixon to become an offshore bank, or shoal, probably at about 950–1050.") As late as the 17th century, it was reported that the remains of the "ancient little city" could be seen at low tide.

=== Keynor ===
The Manor of Keynor is situated at the western end of Pagham Harbour. Selsey-based historians Edward Heron-Allen and Francis Mee favour the Keynor area of Sidlesham for Cymenshore; they suggest that the name Keynor is derived from Cȳmenes ōra. However, Margaret Gelling asserts that Keyn-or actually means Cow-Shore in Old English.

=== Pagham Harbour ===
Pagham Harbour currently is a nature reserve, however in earlier times was a working harbour with three ports, one at the western end at Sidlesham Mill known as Wardur, one at the entrance to the harbour known as Charlton and one on the Pagham side known as the Port of Wythering (Wyderinges). The port of Wardur was part of 'New Haven' a development in the Middle Ages. The Port of Wythering was overrun by the sea in the 13th century and the whole harbour eventually silted up and ceased to be navigable, except for small craft.

=== West Wittering ===
West Wittering has been cited by some early cartographers and historians as the site for Cymenshore. For example in his Britannia Camden said:

Cissa: who beeing of the Saxons line the second king of this pety kingdom, after his father Aella, accompanied with his brother Cimen and no small power of the Saxons, at this shore arrived and landed at Cimonshore, a place so called of the said Cimen, which now hath lost the name; but that it was neere unto Wittering, the charter of the donation which King Cedwalla made unto the Church of Selsey most evidently prooveth. Another fort likewise two miles from Cisiburie is to be seene, which they used to call Chenkburie.

— Camden 1701, p. 228

Also Morden's map of 1695 shows Cimenshore being adjacent to the Witterings.

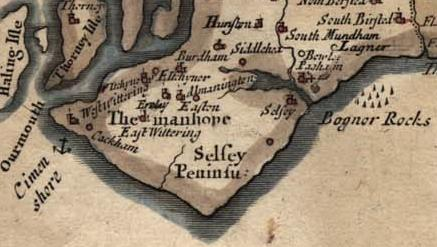
Section of 1695 map of Sussex showing location of Cymenshore (spelt Cimenshore on map)

However, other historians have posited that siting Cymenshore off West Wittering as mistaken and was probably due to a mistranslation of the charter. The charter itself, in the original early English describes part of the boundary of the land as .. Wedering muðe.. (Wedering mouth). Wedering was the port of Withering a village, now lost, at the entrance to what is now Pagham Harbour. It is possible that earlier historians had translated Wedering incorrectly, as Wittering.

== Other possible locations ==
=== Ouse-Cuckmere ===
Welch believes that the location for Cymenshore is more likely to be in the Ouse-Cuckmere area of East Sussex, his reasoning is that there is no archaeological evidence to support a landing at Selsey. However Richardson states that the place names with the Old English ora element of Cymensora are very common along the Hampshire and West Sussex coastline but not around the Ouse-Cuckmere area. There is also a suggestion that the archaeology off the Selsey coast has just not been fully realised yet. (Note: "There is a rich, only partially explored, offshore archaeological legacy of submerged Romano-British, Saxon and early medieval landscape features, partially recorded in documentary and archival records.")

=== Shoreham ===
Shoreham has also been cited as a possible location, John Earle a Victorian Professor of Anglo-Saxon at Oxford suggested that the sons of Ælle were named after the towns of Shoreham, Lancing and Chichester. With the town of Shoreham representing Cymenshoreham.

In 1906 Hilaire Belloc in his Hills and the Sea when discussing St Wilfrid he said:

But those memories were getting worse and worse, for it was nearly two hundred years since the ships of Ælle had sailed into Shoreham, which showed him to be a man of immense determination, for it is a most difficult harbour, and there were then no piers and lights – it was nearly two hundred years, and there was only the least little glimmering twilight left of the old day.

— Belloc 1996, pp. 117–118

== Historical context ==
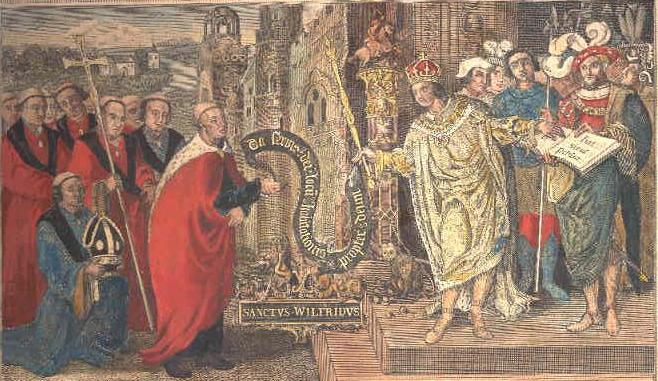
Later engraving of a picture commissioned in 1519 showing Cædwalla confirming a grant of land, at Selsey, to Wilfrid. The position of the presentation is probably where the Mixon is today, based on the location of the church (at Church Norton) in the top left of picture.

=== Jutish settlements ===
Towards the end of the Roman occupation of England, raids on the east coast became more intense and the expedient adopted by Romano-British leaders was to enlist the help of mercenaries to whom they ceded territory. It is thought that mercenaries may have started arriving in Sussex as early as the fifth century. Richard Coates has suggested that the Germanic invaders would previously have traded in the area and probably would have been familiar with the term and eventually use it by preference.

J. E. A. Jolliffe compared agricultural and farming practices across fifth-century Sussex to that of fifth-century Kent. He suggested that the Kentish system underlay the fifth-century farming practices of Sussex. He hypothesised that Sussex was probably settled by Jutes before the arrival of the Saxons, with Jutish territory stretching from Kent to the New Forest.

The Anglo Saxon Chronicle claims that Ælle and his forces landed at Cymenshore and then travelled east and arrived at Beachy Head in 485, where they apparently broke through an agreed river border, the Mercreadesburne. The north Solent coast had been a trading area since Roman times. The old Roman roads from Sidlesham (Note: It is likely that the Chichester to Sidlesham Roman Road extended to Selsey Bill.) to Chichester and from Chichester to Winchester would have provided access to the Jutish settlements in Hampshire. (Note: There is evidence that the Roman roads were still in use during the early Anglo-Saxon period. The Sidlesham to Chichester road would have been the RR156 (using Margary numbers) and the Chichester-Wickham route, for the Meonwara, the RR421.) It is therefore more likely that the Germanic people arriving in the fifth century would have been directed to the north of the ōra, and into Southampton Water. From there into the mouth of the Meon valley and would have been allowed to settle near the existing Romano-British people.

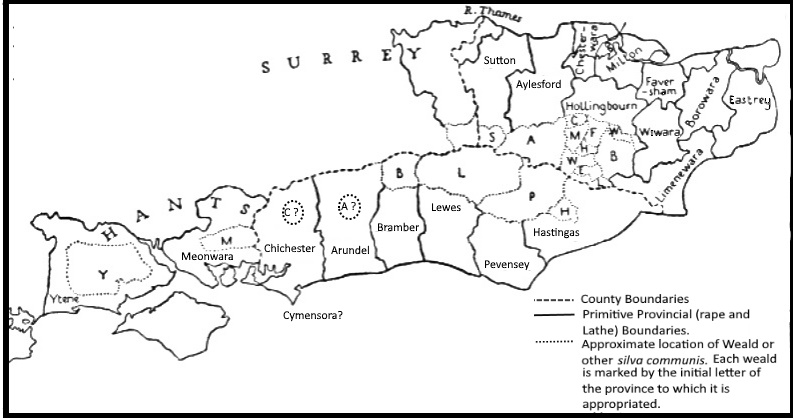
5th century Jutish settlements proposed by J E A Jolliffe

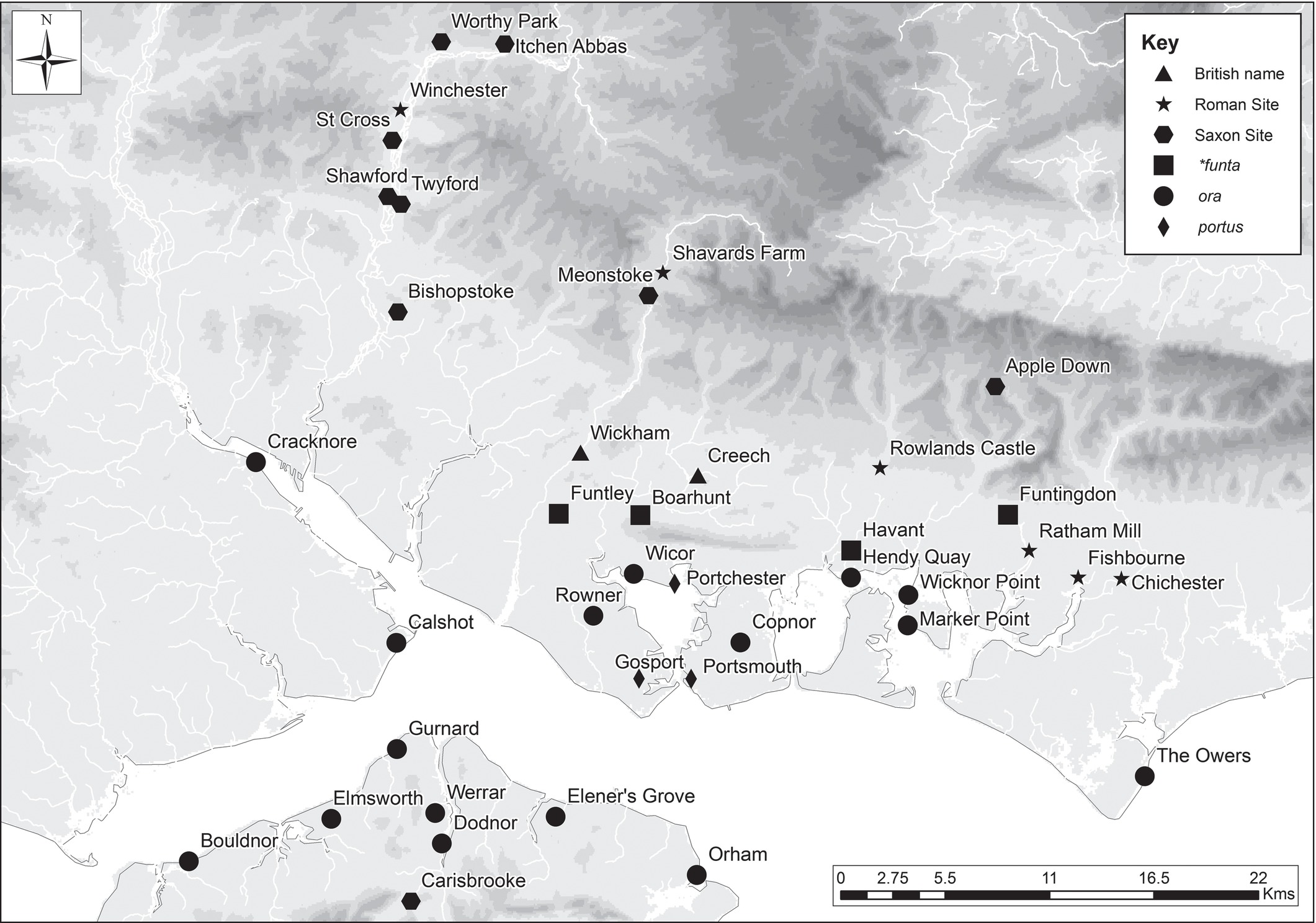
The distribution of funta, ōra and portus place-name elements against select archaeological sites dated to the Roman and Saxon periods

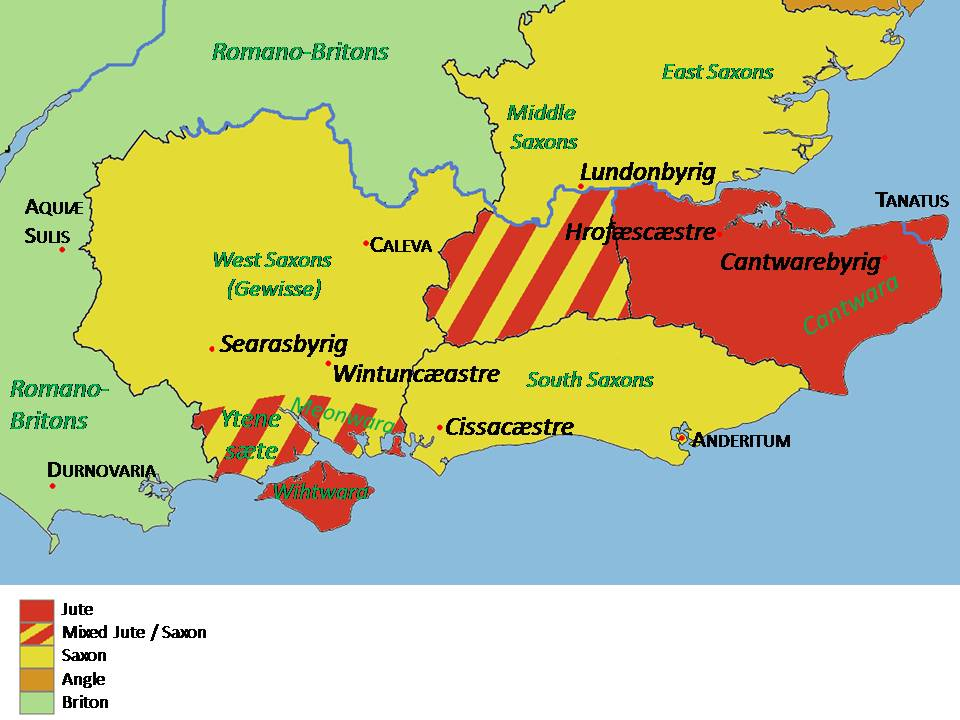
The Anglo-Saxon and Jutish settlements of south east England in the late 6th century

Jutish settlements in south east England..

=== Archaeological evidence ===
The archaeological evidence suggests that the main area of Anglo-Saxon settlement during the fifth century can be identified by the distribution of cemeteries of that period. (Note: Six Anglo-Saxon cemeteries provide the bulk of the archaeological evidence for the early period; these are Highdown, near Worthing, and the group between the rivers Ouse and Cuckmere: Alfriston, Selmeston, South Malling Beddingham and Bishopstone. They all seem to have been of moderate size: those which have been fairly fully excavated are Highdown, with over 170 graves; Alfriston, 150-160; and Bishopstone, 118. Inhumation was the predominant rite in each case, but a proportion of cremations was present at Highdown (about. 28) and Bishopstone (6).) Apart from Highdown, near Worthing and Apple Down, 11 kilometres northwest of Chichester, they are between the lower Ouse and Cuckmere rivers in East Sussex. This area was believed to have been for the treaty settlement of Anglo-Saxon mercenaries, (Note: An excavation locally discovered 282 cremations and inhumations.) and although some historians have suggested that Joliffe's findings 'strained the evidence' somewhat, analysis of grave goods have also provided evidence of Jutish settlement between southern Hampshire and Chichester, in the early to mid-fifth century. These connections had ceased by the end of that century.

== See also ==
- History of Sussex
