= Æthelwulf (disambiguation) =

Æthelwulf (died 858) was King of Wessex from 839 until his death.

Æthelwulf may also refer to:

- Æthelwulf, or Adulf (died c. 680), Anglo-Saxon cleric and saint
- Æthelwulf of Elmham (died after 781), Anglo-Saxon Bishop of Elmham
- Æthelwulf of Selsey (died c. 824), Anglo-Saxon Bishop of Selsey
- Æthelwulf of Berkshire (died 871), Saxon ealdorman who won the Battle of Reading
- Æthelwulf, or Athulf (died after 1013), Anglo-Saxon Bishop of Hereford
- Æthelwulf (poet), Anglo-Saxon poet, author of De abbatibus
- Xavier Wulf, formerly Ethelwulf, American rapper and songwriter

== See also ==
- Adelolf, Count of Boulogne (died 933), Flemish-Saxon nobleman
