= Hermeneutic style =

Style of Latin in the later Roman and early Medieval periods

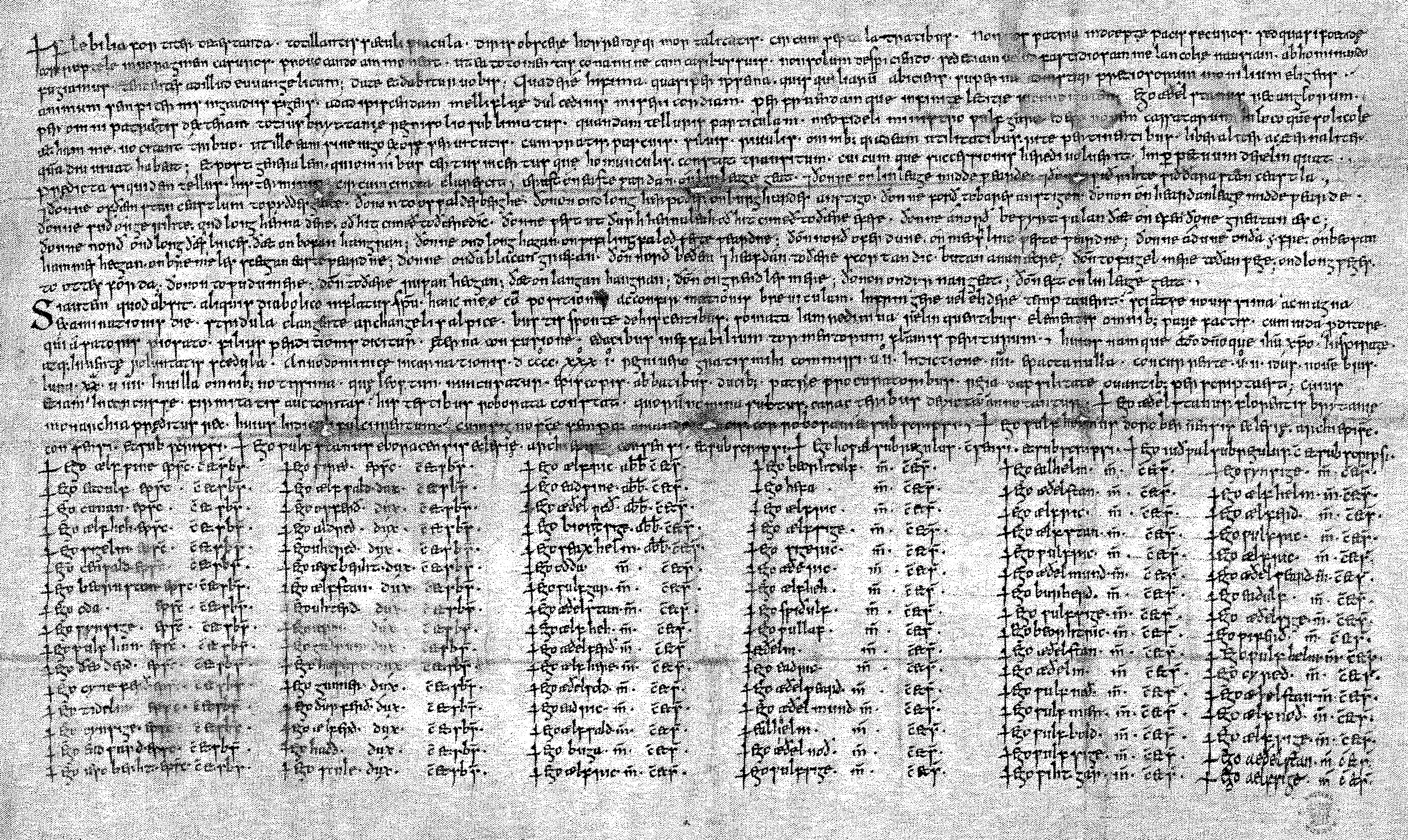
Original charter S 416, written by "Æthelstan A" in hermeneutic style in 931

The hermeneutic style is a style of Latin in the later Roman and early Medieval periods characterised by the extensive use of unusual and arcane words, especially derived from Greek. The style is first found in the work of Apuleius in the second century, and then in several late Roman writers. In the early medieval period, some leading Continental scholars were exponents, including Johannes Scotus Eriugena and Odo of Cluny.

In England, the seventh-century bishop Aldhelm was the most influential hermeneutic writer; Latin scholarship declined in the ninth century, and when it revived in the tenth, the hermeneutic style became increasingly influential. Unlike in continental Europe, where it was used only by a minority of writers, in tenth-century England it became nearly universal. It was the house style of the English Benedictine Reform, the most important intellectual movement in later Anglo-Saxon England. The style fell out of favour after the Norman Conquest, and the twelfth-century chronicler William of Malmesbury described it as disgusting and bombastic. Historians were equally dismissive until the late twentieth century, when scholars such as Michael Lapidge argued that it should be taken seriously as an important aspect of late Anglo-Saxon culture.

== Definition ==
In 1953, Alistair Campbell argued that there were two principal styles of Latin in Anglo-Saxon England. One, which he called the classical, was exemplified by the writings of Bede (c. 672–735), while the English bishop Aldhelm (c. 639–709) was the most influential author of the other school, which extensively used rare words, including Greek ones derived from "hermeneutic" glossaries. Andy Orchard contrasts the "limpid and direct prose style of Bede, with its basically biblical vocabulary and syntax" with the "highly elaborate and ornate style of Aldhelm, with a vocabulary and syntax ultimately derived from Latin verse". Aldhelm was the most learned man in the first four centuries of Anglo-Saxon Christianity, with a profound knowledge of Latin poetry (unlike Bede). His style was highly influential in the two centuries after his death, and it was dominant in later Anglo-Saxon England. Borrowing from Greek was not confined to hermeneutic writers of Latin. In a 2005 study, J. N. Adams, Michael Lapidge and Tobias Reinhardt observe that "the exhumation of (poorly understood) Greek words from Greek-Latin glossaries for purposes of stylistic ornamentation was widespread throughout the Middle Ages."

In the preface to his 1962 edition of Æthelweard's Chronicon, Campbell referred to the "hermeneutic tradition". In 1975, Michael Lapidge developed Campbell's distinction in an essay on the "hermeneutic style". He stated that the term implies that the vocabulary is based mainly on the Hermeneumata, a name for certain Greek-Latin glossaries. He did not consider the term entirely satisfactory, and suggested that "glossematic" would be an alternative, but adopted "hermeneutic" because it had been used by other scholars. (Note: Lapidge's 1975 article is reprinted in his Anglo-Latin Literature, pp. 105–49) Jane Stevenson also expresses dissatisfaction with the term, and in the view of Rebecca Stephenson: "The word "hermeneutic" itself is misleading, since this style has nothing to do with the modern field of hermeneutics, nor does it feature words drawn from the Hermeneumata, a set of Greek and Latin glossaries, from which its exotic vocabulary was once thought to derive." However, both scholars reluctantly accept the term. The style was formerly called "Hisperic", (Note: Eric John refers to "the 'hysperic' style of St Aldhelm".) but scholars now reject this term as wrongly suggesting that it is Irish, and think "Hisperic" should be confined to the language of the very obscure Hisperica Famina.

Lapidge states:

By "hermeneutic" I understand a style whose most striking feature is the ostentatious parade of unusual, often very arcane and apparently learned vocabulary. In Latin literature of the medieval period, this vocabulary is of three general sorts: (1) archaisms, words which were not in use in classical Latin but were exhumed by medieval authors from the grammarians or from Terence and Plautus; (2) neologisms or coinages; and (3) loan words. (Note: The hermeneutic style is sometimes defined as covering any works using the abstruse style of Latin defined by Campbell and Lapidge (e.g. Lapidge 1975, Michael Winterbottom, Mechthild Gretsch), but sometimes confined to English writers of the tenth and eleventh century Benedictine Reform (e.g. Lapidge 2005, David Woodman, Orchard). In this article the term is used in the first sense.)

== Early development ==
Depiction of Apuleius, the first writer known to have used the hermeneutic style

The hermeneutic style was possibly first seen in the Metamorphoses of Apuleius in the second century, and it is also found in works by late Latin writers such as Ammianus Marcellinus and Martianus Capella. In Britain and Ireland, the style is found in authors on the threshold of the medieval period, including the British monk Gildas, the Irish missionary Columbanus and the Anglo-Saxon bishop Aldhelm, and works such as the Hisperica Famina. The Anglo-Saxons were the first people in Europe who had to learn Latin as a foreign language when they converted to Christianity, and in Lapidge's view: "That they attained stylistic mastery in a medium alien to them is remarkable in itself".

The influential ninth-century Irish philosopher Johannes Scotus Eriugena had a thorough knowledge of Greek, and through his translations and use of unusual Greek words in poetry helped to raise the prestige of the hermeneutic style. The style became fashionable at Laon, where Johannes's colleague and fellow Irishman, Martianus Hiberniensis, lectured. Hincmar of Rheims rebuked his nephew, Hincmar of Laon:

But when there are sufficient Latin words which you could have put in those places where you have put grecisms and abstruse words and even Irish words and other barbarisms (Græca et obstrusa et interdum Scottica et alia barbara)—as you saw fit—which are bastardised and corrupt, it would appear that you have inserted those words most unfortunately not out of humility but for the ostentation of those Greek words which you wished to use—which you yourself don't understand—so that everyone who reads them may recognise that you wanted to vomit up words which you hadn't choked down.

== Continental Europe ==
The style is found in several centres on the Continent in the tenth century. In Italy, the leading proponents were Liutprand of Cremona, Eugenius Vulgarius and Atto of Vercelli. In Germany, works which display it include the anonymous Gesta Apollonnii and the letters of Froumond of Tegernsee. French works which display the hermeneutic style include Dudo of Saint-Quentin's Gesta Normanniae Ducum and the Libellus Sacerdotalis by Lios Monocus.

Two other French authors were particularly influential in England. The first two books of Abbo of Saint-Germain's Bella Parisiacae Vrbis describe the siege of Paris by the Normans from 888 to 895; they received very little circulation. However, in order to make the work a trinity (three-volume work) he added a book described by Lapidge as "a series of exhortations to the monastic life … written in a fiercely tangled and often inscrutable Latin whose vocabulary is nearly all glossary-based". This became a very popular textbook, especially in England. The other influential French author was Odo of Cluny, who was probably a mentor of Oda, Archbishop of Canterbury (941–958), a driving force behind the English Benedictine Reform and a proponent of the hermeneutic style. Lapidge suggests that the style in northern France was particularly associated with centres of the Cluniac (Benedictine) reform, and the leading figures in the English reform, Oda, Dunstan, Æthelwold and Oswald, were all practitioners of the hermeneutic style and had strong connections with Continental Benedictine centres. Lapidge argues:

One might surmise that the hermeneutic style was cultivated energetically in England in an attempt to show that English learning was as profound and English writing as sophisticated as anything produced on the Continent. The impetus for the cultivation of the style in tenth-century England was therefore probably of Continental origin.

A late proponent of the style was the German Thiofrid of Echternach, abbot of Echternach between 1083 and 1110, who was strongly influenced by Aldhelm.

== England ==
On the Continent, some writers were exponents of the hermeneutic style; in England in the later tenth century almost all were. The study of difficult texts had been a traditional part of Latin education in England since the days of Aldhelm, and he profoundly influenced later writers. In tenth-century England, Aldhelm and Abbo were studied intensively, whereas hermeneutic works did not form an important part of the Continental curriculum. Aldhelm is described by David Dumville as "the father both of English latinity and of the hermeneutic style of Anglo-Latin letters". His De Virginitate (On Virginity) was particularly influential, and in the 980s an English scholar requested permission from Archbishop Æthelgar to go to Winchester to study it, complaining that he had been starved of intellectual food. A passage in De Virginitate reads:

So, against the dread beast of pride and against these sevenfold brutes of poisonous vices, which strive cruelly to tear apart with their rabid teeth and virulent fangs all who are unarmed, despoiled of the cuirass of virginity and stripped of the shield of chastity, the virgins of Christ and the young champions of the church must fight with muscle and strength. Against, as it were, the ferocious legions of the barbarians, which in their troops never cease to batter the tortoise of the soldiers of Christ with the artillery of guileful fraud, the struggle must go on manfully, fought with the darts of spiritual weaponry and the iron-tipped spears of the virtues. Let us not, like timid soldiers who effeminately dread the shock of war and the call of the trumpeter, inertly offer to the ravening foe the backs of our shoulders rather than the bosses of our shields!

Anglo-Latin suffered a severe decline in the ninth century, partly due to the Viking invasions, but it began to revive in the 890s under Alfred the Great, who revered Aldhelm. Asser's Life of King Alfred has a hermeneutic flavour. Alfred was assisted by scholars he brought in from continental Europe. One of them was a German, John the Old Saxon, and in Lapidge's view a poem he wrote praising the future King Æthelstan, and punning on the Old English meaning of Æthelstan as "noble stone", marks an early sign of a revival of the hermeneutic style:

You, prince, are called by the name "sovereign stone",
Look happily on this prophecy for your age:
You shall be the "noble rock" of Samuel the Seer,
[Standing] with mighty strength against devilish demons.
Often an abundant cornfield foretells a great harvest; in
Peaceful days your stony mass is to be softened.
You are more abundantly endowed with the holy eminence of learning.
I pray you may seek, and the Glorious One may grant, the [fulfilment implied in your] noble name. (Note: The translation is by Lapidge, who dates the poem to the late 890s when Æthelstan was a young boy. Sarah Foot accepts arguments put forward by Gernot Wieland that the poem is more likely to date to the mid-920s, early in Æthelstan's reign.)

The revival of the hermeneutic style was assisted by foreign scholars at the court of King Æthelstan in the late 920s and 930s, some of them, such as Israel the Grammarian, practitioners of hermeneutic Latin. The style was first seen in tenth-century England in charters drafted between 928 and 935 by an anonymous scribe of King Æthelstan called by scholars "Æthelstan A", who was strongly influenced by Aldhelm and by Hiberno-Latin works which may have been brought to England by Israel. According to Scott Thompson Smith, the charters of "Æthelstan A": "are generally characterised by a rich pleonastic style with aggressively literary proems and anathemas, ostentatious language and imagery throughout, decorative rhetorical figures, elaborate dating clauses and extensive witness lists." The charters are first seen shortly after Æthelstan had become the first king of all England by his conquest of Viking-ruled Northumbria in 927, and in the view of Mechthild Gretsch the charters are the result of "the affection of a style associated with a glorious intellectual past in order to boost what was conceived as a glorious military and political achievement".

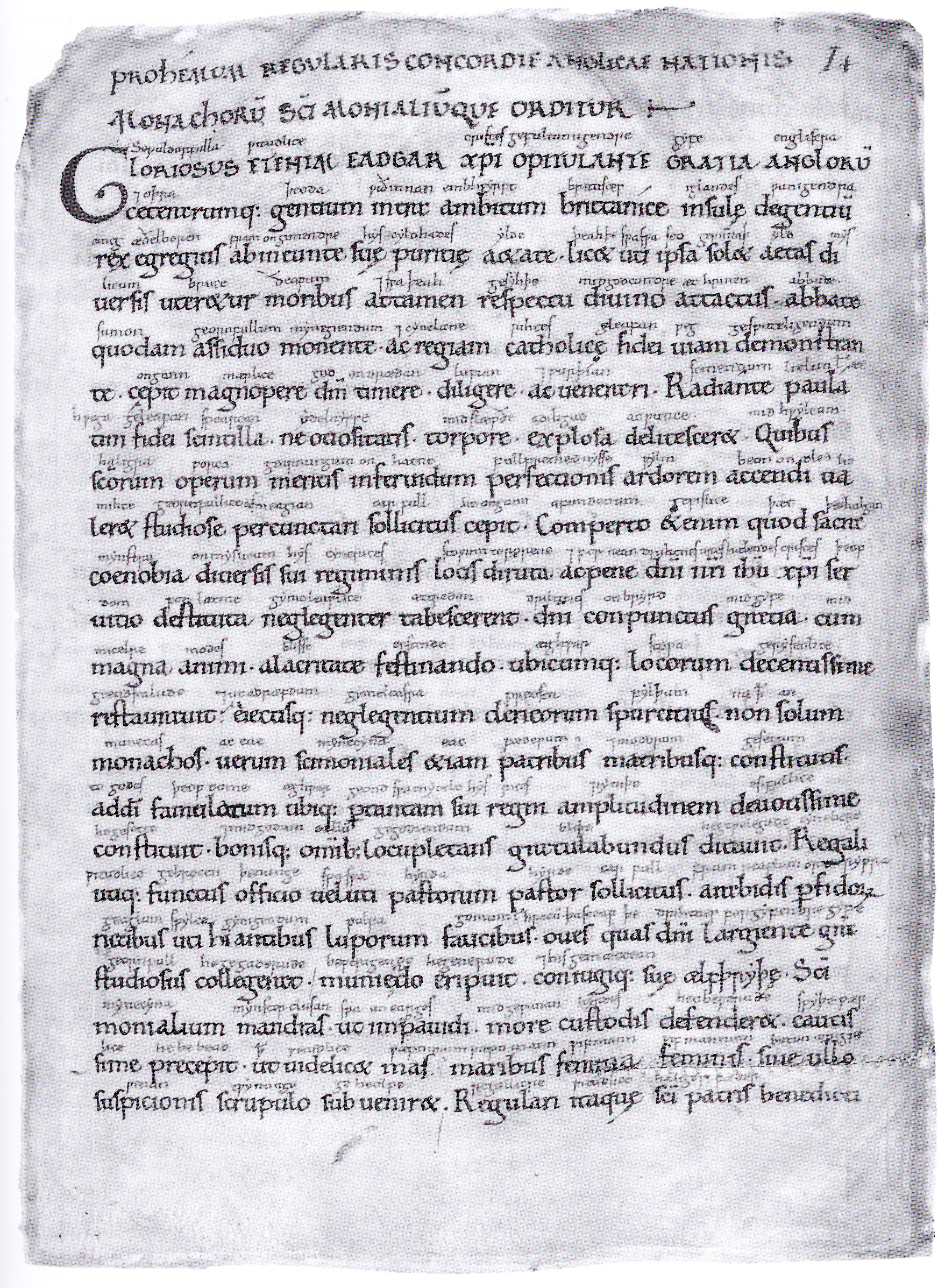
The beginning of the Regularis Concordia, drafted by Æthelwold in hermeneutic style

David Woodman gives a translation of the start of a charter drafted by "Æthelstan A", S 416 issued on 12 November 931:

The lamentable and loudly detestable sins of this tottering age, surrounded by the dire barkings of obscene and fearsome mortality, challenge and urge us, not carefree in a homeland where peace has been attained but, as it were, teetering over an abyss of fetid corruption, that we should flee those things not only by despising them together with their misfortunes with the whole effort of our mind but also by hating them just like the wearisome nausea of melancholy, striving towards that Gospel text, "Give and it will be given unto you".

Only one short hermeneutic work by the mid-century Archbishop of Canterbury, Oda, survives, but his influence can be seen in his protégé Frithegod of Canterbury's Breuiloquium Vitae Wilfredi, described by Lapidge as "the most difficult Anglo-Latin text", which "may dubiously be described as the 'masterpiece' of Anglo-Latin hermeneutic style". Lapidge states that "the hermeneutic style was practised with considerable flair and enthusiasm at Canterbury". Other centres of the style were also closely associated with leaders of the Benedictine reform: Ramsey Abbey, founded by Oswald, Bishop of Worcester, Glastonbury Abbey, where the future Archbishop of Canterbury, Dunstan, was abbot in the 940s and Winchester, where Æthelwold was bishop. There are different emphases in the various centres: a predilection for neologisms at Canterbury and for grecisms at Winchester, while the leading Ramsey scholar, Byrhtferth, favoured unusual polysyllabic adverbs. The most important document of the Benedictine Reform, the Regularis Concordia, drafted by Æthelwold, was written in hermeneutic style strongly influenced by Aldhelm. Discussing the ideology of the reform movement, Caroline Brett comments: "The use of hermeneutic Latin with its deliberately obscure neologisms and verbal borrowings must have sent potent signals of a learned hierocratic caste, guardians of arcane yet powerful knowledge."

Lapidge gives a translation of a poem by Dunstan:

Christ, you grant.

O omnipotent Father, may you deign to bring rewards to the donor – (you) who above the depths and realms of the heaven as well as the earth and at the same time the recesses of the sea – throughout all this world you rule the angelic citizens of such bounteous merit; and may you grant to grow in me the seed of holy labour by which I may always be able to hymn appropriately your name.

O you, Son, who, concealed in your mother's womb, you gather together peoples by your Father's act – for I perchance am able to compose a holy narrative because you are seen to be God, because, glorious one, the glittering stars show (you) to the world; and I ask, after the close of my life, that you grant to me from the throne of heaven to take a tiny gift because of the honour (I have) attained.

I beseech you, Holy Spirit of the Father and Son: for when the holy throng re-echoes its songs, may I then with humble voice be able to ascend quickly as I leave the grave, bearing then the holy prayers of the saints who already have scorned this present world of dust with their learned outpourings, and may I fearlessly be able to pour out my glorious song to the triune (God).

Virgin, whom the messenger salutes in angelic speech, you were born without stain: I ask that you implore him – who, born from the conception of celestial seed holds the mysterious command as triunal deity – to forgive me my sins, that he may deign to grant longlasting joys through his own eternity and to look upon me with the sight of his holy vision.

Grant, I beseech you, O prophetic fathers, O you patriarchs, O you prophets of angelic distinction, O you leaders blessedly confessing with the Lord his holy governance – Abraham, Elijah, Enoch his companion, together with all the rest – that the king quickly deign to render skilfully his aid to me in the three sounds of 'O', lest the deceitful one, who rules in the front of the nine fallen orders, be able to say the word "puppup". (Note: Lapidge says: "As I understand the stanza, the threefold repetition of the syllable 'O' is intended to vanquish the devil's bisyllabic muttering 'puppup'.")

Now I beseech the ancient fathers with Peter their leader on behalf of wretched and anxious me: pour out your prayers and aid so that the trinal custodian of each new saint may afterwards forgive me until I may overcome the hideous enemy of this world.

Christ, you grant.

In the late tenth century, Latin had higher prestige than Anglo-Saxon, and hermeneutic Latin had higher prestige than simple Latin. This presented Byrhtferth with a problem in his Enchiridion, a school text designed to teach the complicated rules for calculating the date of Easter, as hermeneutic Latin is unsuitable for pedagogic instruction. His solution was to include passages in hermeneutic Latin condemning the ignorant and lazy secular clergy (non-monastic priests), who he said refused to learn Latin, thus justifying using Anglo-Saxon to provide clear explanations for their benefit. In a passage in Latin he wrote:

Some ignorant clerics reject calculations of this kind (for shame!) and do not wish to keep their phylacteries, that is, they do not preserve the order, which they have received in the bosom of mother church, nor do they persist in the holy teaching of meditation. They should consider carefully the way of the Pharisees and the Sadducees, and they should spit out their doctrine like filth. A cleric ought to be the keeper of his own soul, just as a noble man subjects a young foal to the yoke, so he ought to subject his own soul to service, by filling the alabaster box with precious oil, that is, he ought to be inwardly subjected daily, by obeying the divine laws and admonitions of the Redeemer.

Byrhtferth aimed for an elevated style, but he was frequently guilty of solecisms caused by overreaching his ability in Latin.

Almost all proponents of the style were clerical, but there is one notable exception. Ealdorman Æthelweard was a descendant of King Æthelred I, grandfather of an Archbishop of Canterbury, and patron of Ælfric of Eynsham, the one major English writer of the period who rejected the style. Æthelweard's Chronicon was a translation into hermeneutic Latin of a lost version of the Anglo-Saxon Chronicle. His style is regarded by historians as eccentric and at times unintelligible. In the view of Angelika Lutz his prose was influenced by Anglo-Saxon heroic poetry as well as Latin and Greek sources: "That it was later viewed as a failure may be attributed both to his limited command of Latin grammar and his extreme stylistic pretensions."

In 2005 Lapidge reflected:

Thirty years ago, when I first attempted to describe the characteristic features of tenth-century Anglo-Latin literature, I was rather naively bedazzled by the display of vocabulary which one encounters there. Because much of the vocabulary appeared to derive either from Aldhelm or from glossaries of the type called "hermeneumata", I followed scholarly tradition and described the style as "hermeneutic", on the assumption that the principal impulse behind the verbal display was that of dazzling the reader with arcane vocabulary exhumed from Greek-Latin glossaries and authors such as Aldhelm. I now suspect that the perception needs modification: that the authors' principal aim was not obfuscation, but was their (misguided, perhaps) attempt to reach in their prose a high stylistic register.

== Decline ==
After the Norman Conquest authors rejected the hermeneutic style. The twelfth-century chronicler William of Malmesbury expressed his disgust at language he considered bombastic. In Frank Stenton's view, Byrhtferth's hermeneutic life of Oswald gives a poor impression of the quality of English scholarship. He described it as "a disorderly work, written in a flamboyant prose, studded with strange words, which had to be explained by glosses inserted between the lines".

Lapidge describes the repudiation of the hermeneutic style by modern scholars as disappointing. "Invariably it is castigated as 'uncouth' or 'barbarous' and its practitioners are dismissed with contempt as the fellows of Dogberry." In his view: "however unpalatable this style might be to modern taste, it was none the less a vital and pervasive aspect of late Anglo-Saxon culture, and it deserves closer and more sympathetic attention than it has previously received".

== Sources ==
- Adams, J.N.; Lapidge, Michael; Reinhardt, Tobias (2005). "Introduction". In Reinhardt, Tobias; Lapidge, Michael; Adams, J.N. (eds.). Aspects of the Language of Latin Prose. Oxford, UK: Oxford University Press. ISBN 978-0-19-726332-7.
- Brett, Caroline (1997). "The Tenth-Century Benedictine Reform in England". Early Medieval Europe. 6 (1). Oxford, UK: Blackwell Publishers: 77–94. doi:10.1111/1468-0254.00004. ISSN 0963-9462. S2CID 161695919.
- Campbell, Alistair (1953). "Some Linguistic Features of Early Anglo-Latin Verse and its Use of Classical Models". Transactions of the Philological Society. 11. Oxford, UK: Basil Blackwell. ISSN 0079-1636.
- Campbell, Alistair, ed. (1962). The Chronicle of Æthelweard. Edinburgh, UK: Thomas Nelson and Sons Ltd. OCLC 245905467.
- Dumville, David (1992). "Learning and the Church in the England of King Edmund I, 939-946". Wessex and England from Alfred to Edgar. Woodbridge, UK: The Boydell Press. pp. 173–84. ISBN 978-0-85115-308-7.
- Foot, Sarah (2011). Æthelstan: The First King of England. New Haven, US: Yale University Press. ISBN 978-0-300-12535-1.
- Gretsch, Mechthild (1999). The Intellectual Foundations of the English Benedictine Reform. Cambridge, UK: Cambridge University Press. ISBN 978-0-521-03052-6.
- John, Eric (1966). Orbis Britanniae. Leicester, UK: Leicester University Press. OCLC 398831.
- Keynes, Simon; Lapidge, Michael, eds. (1983). Alfred the Great: Asser's Life of King Alfred & Other Contemporary Sources. London, UK: Penguin Classics. ISBN 978-0-14-044409-4.
- Kornexl, Lucia (2014). "Regularis Concordia". In Lapidge, Michael; Blair, John; Keynes, Simon; Scragg, Donald (eds.). The Wiley Blackwell Encyclopaedia of Anglo-Saxon England (2nd ed.). Chichester, UK: Wiley Blackwell. ISBN 978-0-631-22492-1.
- Lapidge, Michael (1975). "The Hermeneutic Style in Tenth-Century Anglo-Latin Literature". Anglo-Saxon England. 4. Cambridge, UK: Cambridge University Press: 67–111. doi:10.1017/S0263675100002726. ISSN 0263-6751.
- Lapidge, Michael (1985). "General Introduction". In Lapidge, Michael; Rosier, James L. (eds.). Aldhelm, The Poetic Works. Cambridge, UK: D. S. Brewer. ISBN 978-0-85991-146-7.
- Lapidge, Michael (1988). "Æthelwold as Scholar and Teacher". In Yorke, Barbara (ed.). Bishop Æthelwold: His Career and Influence. Woodbridge, UK: The Boydell Press. ISBN 978-0-85115-705-4.
- Lapidge, Michael (1993). Anglo-Latin Literature 900–1066. London, UK: The Hambledon Press. ISBN 978-1-85285-012-8.
- Lapidge, Michael (2005). "Poeticism in Pre-Conquest Anglo-Latin Prose". In Reinhardt, Tobias; Lapidge, Michael; Adams, J.N. (eds.). Aspects of the Language of Latin Prose. Oxford, UK: Oxford University Press. ISBN 978-0-19-726332-7.
- Lapidge, Michael, ed. (2009). Byrhtferth of Ramsey: The Lives of St Oswald and St Ecgwine. Oxford, UK: Clarendon Press. ISBN 978-0-19-955078-4.
- Lapidge, Michael (2014). "Aldhelm". In Lapidge, Michael; Blair, John; Keynes, Simon; Scragg, Donald (eds.). The Wiley Blackwell Encyclopaedia of Anglo-Saxon England (2nd ed.). Chichester, UK: Wiley Blackwell. ISBN 978-0-631-22492-1.
- Lutz, Angelika (January 2000). "Æthelweard's Chronicon and Old English poetry". Anglo-Saxon England. 29. Cambridge, UK: Cambridge University Press: 177–214. doi:10.1017/S0263675100002453. ISSN 0263-6751. S2CID 162750279.
- Orchard, Andy (2014). "Prose Style, L atin". In Lapidge, Michael; Blair, John; Keynes, Simon; Scragg, Donald (eds.). The Wiley Blackwell Encyclopaedia of Anglo-Saxon England (2nd ed.). Chichester, UK: Wiley Blackwell. ISBN 978-0-631-22492-1.
- Smith, Scott Thompson (2012). Land and Book: Literature and Land Tenure in Anglo-Saxon England. Toronto, Canada: University of Toronto Press. ISBN 978-1-4426-4486-1.
- Stenton, Frank (1971). Anglo-Saxon England (3rd ed.). Oxford, UK: Oxford University Press. ISBN 978-0-19-280139-5.
- Stephenson, Rebecca (December 2009). "Scapegoating the Secular Clergy: the Hermeneutic Style as a Form of Monastic Self-Definition". Anglo-Saxon England. 38. Cambridge, UK: Cambridge University Press: 101–135. doi:10.1017/S0263675109990081. ISSN 0263-6751. S2CID 170841963.
- Stephenson, Rebecca (2011). "Byrhtferth's Enchiridion: The Effectiveness of Hermeneutic Latin". In Tyler, Elizabeth M. (ed.). Conceptualizing Multilingualism in England, c. 800-C. 1250. Turnhout, Belgium: Brepols. ISBN 978-2-503-52856-4.
- Stevenson, Jane (2002). "The Irish Contribution to Anglo-Latin Hermeneutic Prose". In Richter, Michael; Picard, Jean Michel (eds.). Ogma: Essays in Celtic Studies in Honour of Prionseas Ni Chathain. Dublin, Ireland: Four Courts Press. ISBN 978-1-85182-671-1.
- Wieland, Gernot R. (2001). "The Hermeneutic Style of Thiofrid of Echternach". In Echard, Siân; Wieland, Gernot R. (eds.). Anglo-Latin and its Heritage: Essays in Honour of A. G. Rigg on his 64th Birthday. Turnhout, Belgium: Brepols. ISBN 978-2-503-50838-2.
- Winterbottom, Michael (December 1977). "Aldhelm's Prose Style and its Origins". Anglo-Saxon England. 6. Cambridge, UK: Cambridge University Press: 39–76. doi:10.1017/S0263675100000934. ISSN 0263-6751. S2CID 161796923.
- Woodman, D. A. (December 2013). "'Æthelstan A' and the Rhetoric of Rule". Anglo-Saxon England. 42. Cambridge, UK: Cambridge University Press: 217–248. doi:10.1017/S0263675113000112. ISSN 0263-6751. S2CID 159948509.
