= Totta =

Totta may refer to:

- Banco Santander Totta
- Totta Näslund
- Matthieu Totta
- Totta—alternate spelling for Tota, an 8th century Bishop of Selsey
