= Ælfmær =

Ælfmær or Ælfmaer is an Old English given name. Notable people with the name include:

- Ælfmær (bishop of Sherborne) (died 1023), Anglo-Saxon bishop in Wessex
- Ælfmær (bishop of Selsey) (died c. 1031), Anglo-Saxon bishop in Sussex
