= Gislhere =

8th-century Bishop of Selsey

- Bishop of Selsey
- Appointed: between 772 and 780
- Term ended: between 781 and 787
- Predecessor: Osweald
- Successor: Tota

Orders
- Consecration: between 772 and 780

Personal details
- Died: between 781 and 787
- Denomination: Christian

Gislhere (died c. 785) was an English Bishop of Selsey in the eighth century.

In 780 Gislhere witnessed a charter of Ealdorman Oslac of Sussex.

Gislhere was present at the Synod of Brentford, Middlesex, in 781.

Gislhere was consecrated between 772 and 780, and died between 781 and 787.

== Citations ==
Christian titles
Preceded by Osweald	Bishop of Selsey flourished about 775	Succeeded by Tota
