= Ordbriht =

10th and 11th-century Bishop of Selsey

- Bishop of Selsey
- Appointed: between 988 and 990
- Term ended: between 1007 and 1009
- Predecessor: Æthelgar
- Successor: Ælfmær
- Other post: Abbot of Chertsey

Personal details
- Died: between 1007 and 1009
- Denomination: Christian

Ordbriht was a monk at Glastonbury, Winchester, and then Abingdon until 964 when he was appointed Abbot of Chertsey by Æthelwold; Ordbriht attests as Bishop of Selsey from about 989 to 1007 or 1008.

Ordbriht became bishop of Selsey between 988 and 990 and he died between 1007 and 1009.

== Citations ==
Christian titles
Preceded by Æthelgar	Bishop of Selsey c. 989–c. 1008	Succeeded by Ælfmær
