= Æthelric I =

11th-century Bishop of Selsey

Æthelric
- Bishop of Selsey
- Appointed: before 1032
- Term ended: 1038
- Predecessor: Ælfmær
- Successor: Grimketel

Personal details
- Died: 1038
- Denomination: Christian

Æthelric I (died 1038) was an Anglo-Saxon Bishop of Selsey.

== Life ==
Perhaps previously a monk at Christ Church Canterbury, Æthelric was probably Bishop of Selsey by 1032, when he witnessed a charter of King Cnut. Nothing else is known of his origins.

But is it curious that Æthelric's predecessor supposedly attested a charter of Cnut dated 1033. The probable explanation is that Ælfmær witnessed the conveyance itself which took place in 1032 but the charter recording the transaction was not prepared until 1033.

According to the Anglo-Saxon Chronicle, version D, Æthelric died in 1038: "In this year died Archbishop Æthelnoth the Good, also Æthelric, Bishop of Sussex, who desired of God that He would not allow him to outlive his dear father Æthelnoth".

The Handbook of British Chronology gives the dates of his bishopric as 1032 through November or December 1038. The historian Frank Barlow felt that Æthelric was the ultimate source for information Eadmer gathered about Dunstan. Barlow also felt that Æthelric was a member of Dunstan's reforming group.

== Citations ==
Christian titles
Preceded by Ælfmær	Bishop of Selsey before 1032–1038	Succeeded by Grimketel
