= Wihthun =

8th-century Bishop of Selsey

- Bishop of Selsey
- Appointed: c. 789
- Term ended: between 805 and 811
- Predecessor: Tota
- Successor: Æthelwulf

Personal details
- Died: between 805 and 811
- Denomination: Christian

Wihthun (Note: Sometimes Wehthun or Withun) (died c. 808) was an early medieval Bishop of Selsey.

== Life ==
Wihthun seems to have been appointed bishop in 789, as he appears last among the bishops in the witness list of a charter issued by Osfrith, King of Mercia, to Wærmund, Bishop of Rochester in that year.

Wihthun's last datable subscriptions are to two charters of 805: a grant by Cuthred, King of Kent, to Archbishop Wulfred, and a grant by Coenwulf, King of Mercia, and Cuthred, King of Kent, to a priest called Wulfhard. He also witnessed a grant from between 805 and 807 by Cuthred, King of Kent, to Æthelnoth, praefectus.

Wihthun died sometime after 805 and before 811.

== Citations ==
Christian titles
Preceded by Tota	Bishop of Selsey flourished about 790	Succeeded by Æthelwulf
