= Sigeric (bishop) =

Archbishop of Canterbury from 990 to 994

- Archbishop of Canterbury
- Appointed: 990
- Term ended: 28 October 994
- Predecessor: Æthelgar
- Successor: Ælfric of Abingdon
- Other posts: Abbot of St Augustine's; Bishop of Ramsbury

Orders
- Consecration: c. 985 by Dunstan

Personal details
- Died: 28 October 994
- Buried: Christ Church, Canterbury

Sigeric (Note: Older sources occasionally use Siric.) (died 28 October 994) was the Archbishop of Canterbury from 990 to 994. Educated at Glastonbury Abbey, he became a monk there before becoming an abbot and then Bishop of Ramsbury before his elevation to the archbishopric. An account of his pilgrimage to Rome in 990 survives and is an important source for historians studying Rome during his lifetime.

While archbishop, Sigeric was faced with Viking invasions, and supported giving money to the invaders to deter their attacks. He also advised King Æthelred the Unready on religious foundations. Sigeric died in 994 and his will gave his books to Canterbury.

== Early career ==
Sigeric was educated at Glastonbury Abbey, where he took holy orders. He was elected Abbot of St Augustine's in about 975 to 990, and consecrated by Archbishop Dunstan as Bishop of Ramsbury in 985 or 986. He was transferred to the see of Canterbury in 990. He may have been a disciple of Dunstan's, and some accounts state that it was Sigeric that changed the clergy at Christ Church, Canterbury from secular clerics to monks.

== Archbishop ==
Sigeric made the pilgrimage to Rome following the Via Francigena to receive his pallium in 990, and a contemporary record of this journey still exists. This work is essentially a group of entries on the itinerary written by an unknown member of the group accompanying the archbishop. It details in Latin the stay in Rome and the return journey to Canterbury. It is now in the British Library as a part of the Cotton Library as manuscript Tiberius B.V. The manuscript mentions the 23 churches in Rome that were visited, a lunch with Pope John XV, and the stages of the return journey. It is usually given the title the "Itinerary of Archbishop Sigeric". The importance of the document lies in its information on the churches in Rome in the tenth century.

Sigeric was one of the leading magnates who advised King Æthelred the Unready to pay a tribute of £10,000 to Olaf Tryggvason, the leader of the army which defeated the English at the Battle of Maldon, in 991. In 994, Sigeric paid a sum of money to the Danes to protect Canterbury Cathedral from being burned. According to the historian Simon Keynes: "He gained much posthumous notoriety for such actions, and appears with the nickname (Sigeric) 'Danegeld' in a late fourteenth-century history of the archbishops of Canterbury."

In the same year, a diploma granting rights to the diocese of Cornwall and Bishop Ealdred of Cornwall stated that it was written by Sigeric, but it is unlikely that the document was actually written by the archbishop. In 993 or 994, Sigeric conducted the ceremony rededicating the Old Minster at Winchester, an event that the historian H. R. Loyn calls "magnificent".

While Sigeric was an abbot, Ælfric dedicated a book of translated homilies to him. He also advised Æthelred to found Cholsey Abbey in Berkshire (the site is now in Oxfordshire), in honour of King Edward the Martyr, as well as having Edward memorialised at Shaftesbury Abbey.

== Death and legacy ==
Sigeric died on 28 October 994. He was buried in Christ Church, Canterbury. His will left wall hangings to Glastonbury Abbey as well as a collection of books to Canterbury.

== Citations ==
Christian titles
Preceded by Wulfgar	Bishop of Ramsbury c. 985–990	Succeeded by Ælfric of Abingdon
Preceded by Æthelgar	Archbishop of Canterbury; 990–994	Succeeded by Ælfric of Abingdon
