= Aluberht =

8th-century Bishop of Selsey

- Bishop of Selsey
- Appointed: between 747 and 765
- Term ended: between 772 and 780
- Predecessor: Sigeferth of Selsey
- Successor: Oswald of Selsey

Orders
- Consecration: between 747 and 765

Personal details
- Died: between 772 and 780
- Denomination: Christian

Aluberht, or Ealubeorht, was a medieval Bishop of Selsey , consecrated between 747 and 765 and died between 772 and 780.

== Citations ==
Christian titles
Preceded by Sigeferth of Selsey	Bishops of Selsey flourished 770	Succeeded by Oswald of Selsey
