= Cynered =

9th-century Bishop of Selsey

- Bishop of Selsey
- Appointed: before 821
- Term ended: between 839 and 845
- Predecessor: Æthelwulf
- Successor: Guthheard

Personal details
- Died: between 839 and 845
- Denomination: Christian

Cynered, (or Coenred) was a Bishop of Selsey.

Cynered received a confirmation from Coelwulf, King of Mercia, between 821 and 823 of the land originally granted by Noðhelm to his sister Noðgyð.

Cynered was present at a synod æt Astran in 839. Cynered's bishopric can be dated approximately to (in or before 821-823) to (in or after 839), and that is much as the historical evidence permits.

Cynered died some time between 839 and 845.

== Citations ==
Christian titles
Preceded by Æthelwulf	Bishop of Selsey c. 821- c. 842	Succeeded by Guthheard
