= Eadhelm =

10th-century Bishop of Selsey

- Bishop of Selsey
- Appointed: before 963
- Term ended: between 979 and 980
- Predecessor: Brihthelm
- Successor: Æthelgar

Personal details
- Died: between 979 and 980
- Denomination: Christian

Eadhelm was a medieval Bishop of Selsey.

Eadhelm attests documents from 963 to 979.

Eadhelm died between 979 and 980.

== Citations ==
Christian titles
Preceded by Brihthelm	Bishop of Selsey c. 963-c. 980	Succeeded by Æthelgar
