= Oswald of Selsey =

8th-century Bishop of Selsey

Oswald
- Bishop of Selsey
- Appointed: between 747 and 765
- Term ended: between 772 and 780
- Predecessor: Aluberht
- Successor: Gislhere

Orders
- Consecration: between 747 and 765

Personal details
- Died: between 772 and 780
- Denomination: Christian

Oswald (died c. 776) was a medieval Bishop of Selsey, often called Osa for short.

== Life ==
In 765 Oswald witnessed a charter of Osmund, King of Sussex.

In 772 Oswald received a grant from Osfrith, King of Mercia.

Kelly suggested that "It is possible that Osa was a kinsman of King Osmund, and of the contemporary Oslac and Oswald, who also seem to have been regarded as kings before 772".

Oswald was consecrated between 747 and 765, and died between 772 and 780.

== Citations ==
Christian titles
Preceded by Aluberht	Bishops of Selsey flourished about 765	Succeeded by Gislhere
