= Wighelm =

9th and 10th-century Bishop of Selsey

- Bishop of Selsey
- Appointed: before 909
- Term ended: between 909 and 925
- Predecessor: Guthheard
- Successor: Beornheah

Personal details
- Died: between 909 and 925
- Denomination: Christian

Wighelm is a probable Bishop of Selsey.

Wighelm's see is uncertain, but as he is the sole episcopal witness on a charter, involving land in the area, suggests that he had authority in Sussex.

Wighelm died sometime between 909 and 925.

== Citations ==
Christian titles
Preceded by Guthheard	Bishop of Selsey c. 909 - c. 912	Succeeded by Beornheah
