= Alistair Campbell (academic) =

British scholar of Anglo-Saxon (1907–1974)

Alistair Campbell (12 December 1907 – 5 February 1974) was a British academic who was Rawlinson and Bosworth Professor of Anglo-Saxon, University of Oxford, and Fellow of Pembroke College, Oxford, from October 1963 until his death. He was the editor of editions of the Old English poem "Battle of Brunanburh", Æthelweard's Chronicon and Æthelwulf's De abbatibus. He was the author of Old English Grammar (Oxford: Clarendon Press, 1959 ISBN 0-19-811901-1). He translated the mediaeval Latin text, Encomium Emmae Reginae, into modern English for the first time, published in 1949. This was reprinted in 1998 by Cambridge University Press, with a supplementary introduction from Simon Keynes.

Campbell first drew the distinction between the classical and hermeneutic styles of late Roman and early medieval Latin.

== Sources ==
- Campbell, Alistair (1953). "Some Linguistic Features of Early Anglo-Latin Verse and its Use of Classical Models". Transactions of the Philological Society. 11. Oxford, UK: Basil Blackwell. ISSN 0079-1636.
- Campbell, Alistair, ed. (1962). The Chronicle of Æthelweard. Edinburgh, UK: Thomas Nelson and Sons Ltd. OCLC 245905467.
- Lapidge, Michael (1993). Anglo-Latin Literature 900–1066. London, UK: The Hambledon Press. ISBN 1-85285-012-4.
