= Wulfhun =

10th-century Bishop of Selsey

- Bishop of Selsey
- Appointed: before 931
- Term ended: between 940 and 943
- Predecessor: Beornheah
- Successor: Ælfred

Personal details
- Died: between 940 and 943
- Denomination: Christian

Wulfhun was a Bishop of Selsey (in modern-day England) during the 10th century.

In 931 Wulfhun witnessed a charter of King Athelstan, although his see is not mentioned.

According to Kelly, Wulfhun continued to attest until 940, but was no longer in office by 943. It is therefore assumed that Wulfhun died between 940 and 943.

== Citations ==
Christian titles
| Preceded by Beornheah | Bishop of Selsey | Succeeded by Ælfred |
