= Ælfred of Selsey =

10th-century Bishop of Selsey

- Bishop of Selsey
- Appointed: between 940 and 943
- Term ended: between 953 and 956
- Predecessor: Wulfhun
- Successor: Brihthelm

Personal details
- Died: between 953 and 956
- Denomination: Christian

Ælfred or Alfred (died 953–956) was an Anglo-Saxon Bishop of Selsey. Ælfred attests charters from 943 to 953. In 945 he received a grant of land from Edmund I. Ælfred died between 953 and 956.

== Citations ==
Christian titles
Preceded by Wulfhun	Bishop of Selsey c. 943– c. 954	Succeeded by Brihthelm
