= Ælfric of Abingdon =

Archbishop of Canterbury from 995 to 1005

Saint Ælfric
- Archbishop of Canterbury
- Appointed: 21 April 995
- Term ended: 16 November 1005
- Predecessor: Sigeric
- Successor: Ælfheah
- Other posts: Abbot of Abingdon; Bishop of Ramsbury

Orders
- Consecration: c. 992

Personal details
- Died: 16 November 1005 Canterbury, Kent, England
- Buried: Canterbury Cathedral

Sainthood
- Feast day: 16 November
- Venerated in: Roman Catholic Church; Anglican Communion; Eastern Orthodox Church
- Canonized: Pre-Congregation

Ælfric of Abingdon (Note: Old English: Ælfrīc and also known as Ælfric of Wessex.) (died 16 November 1005) was a late 10th-century Archbishop of Canterbury. He previously held the offices of abbot of St Albans Abbey and Bishop of Ramsbury, as well as likely being the abbot of Abingdon Abbey. After his election to Canterbury, he continued to hold the bishopric of Ramsbury along with the archbishopric of Canterbury until his death in 1005. Ælfric may have altered the composition of Canterbury's cathedral chapter by changing the clergy serving in the cathedral from secular clergy to monks. In his will he left a ship to King Æthelred II of England as well as more ships to other legatees.

== Early life ==
Ælfric was the son of an earl of Kent and became a monk of Abingdon Abbey in Berkshire (now Oxfordshire). He was very likely Abbot of Abingdon before becoming Abbot of St Albans Abbey around 975, although some historians do not believe that he held the office of Abbot at Abingdon. Although the Historia Ecclesie Abbendonensis, or History of the Church of Abingdon, names Ælfric as abbot, the abbatial lists do not record him as such. Indirect corroboration of his being abbot at Abingdon is a grant of land to Ælfric personally (instead of to the office he held) while he was archbishop that had previously been unjustly taken from Abingdon. This land was to revert to Abingdon after Ælfric's death.

== Bishop and archbishop ==
Ælfric's brother, Leofric, succeeded him as Abbot of St Albans when he became bishop. Between 991 and 993, Ælfric rose to the Bishopric of Ramsbury, and possibly continued to hold office of abbot of St Albans while bishop. In 995 he was elevated to the see of Canterbury. He was translated, or moved with appropriate ecclesiastical ceremony, to Canterbury on 21 April 995 at a witenagemot held at Amesbury. Here he received the permission of "King Æthelred and all the witan" to be elevated to Canterbury. Ælfric continued to hold Ramsbury along with Canterbury until his death. The story that his brother was chosen first for Canterbury but refused stems from confusion on the part of Matthew of Paris and historians generally hold the entire episode to be untrue.

Ælfric's appointment to Canterbury caused consternation with the clergy of the cathedral chapter. In reaction, the chapter sent two members to Rome ahead of Ælfric and tried to secure the archbishopric for either of the monks. Pope Gregory V, however, would not appoint a candidate without royal permission, which neither of the monks had. Instead, when Ælfric arrived in Rome in 997, he was appointed and received the pallium, a symbol of an archbishop's authority. He also witnessed some miracles at the gravesite of Edward the Martyr at Shaftesbury Abbey, helping to lead to Edward's sainthood.

A story was told that Ælfric introduced monks into the cathedral church of Christ Church, Canterbury, replacing the secular clerks that had taken over the foundation during the ninth century. Ælfric is said to have done this on the command of the pope. This story originally dates to soon after the Norman Conquest and originated with the monastic historians of Canterbury, and its veracity is unclear. He likely performed the marriage ceremony of King Æthelred the Unready and Emma of Normandy in 1002. A later tradition held that he consecrated a Bishop of Llandaff and two Bishops of St. David's in Wales, which, if true, would have meant extending Canterbury's jurisdiction into new territory.

Either Ælfric or his predecessor Sigeric wrote a letter to Wulfsige, Bishop of Sherborne about the duties of bishops to make sure that the laity did not despoil churches. The letter also urged Wulfsige to exhort the laity to strive for justice in their dealings with others, help widows and orphans, not fight, as well as other moral precepts. Ælfric also ordered the composition of the first Life of Dunstan, a hagiography, or saint's life, of Dunstan, a predecessor as Archbishop of Canterbury. He also acted as a royal judge, once being ordered by King Æthelred to adjudicate a case between thegns, or local noblemen.

== Death and legacy ==
Ælfric died on 16 November 1005 and was buried in Abingdon Abbey, later being translated to Canterbury Cathedral. His will survives and in it he left ships to the people of Wiltshire and Kent, with his best one, equipped for sixty men, going to King Æthelred. The hagiography of Dunstan was dedicated to Ælfric at the end of the 10th century. After his death, he was considered a saint with a feast day of 16 November.

== Citations ==
Christian titles
Preceded by Sigeric	Bishop of Ramsbury c. 992–1005	Succeeded by Bertwald
Preceded by Sigeric	Archbishop of Canterbury; 995–1005	Succeeded by Ælfheah
