= Hermeneumata =

Antique language guides

The Hermeneumata (Greek: Ἑρμηνεύματα; also known as the Hermeneumata Pseudodositheana or Hermeneumata pseudo-Dositheana) are anonymous instructional manuals written in the third century CE to teach the Greek language to Latin-speaking people in the Roman Empire, and to teach Latin to Greek-speakers. The word Hermeneumata means "translations" or "interpretations".

== History ==
The Hermeneumata were composed as a Greek-Latin schoolbook in late antiquity, probably around the third century CE. The work was originally composed to help Greek pupils learn Latin, but in the medieval West, it came to be widely used as a source for Latin-literate authors to learn about Greek.

In the twentieth century, the name of the Hermeneumata inspired scholars to give the name Hermeneutic style to a style of Latin writing found in late Antiquity and the early Medieval West which was characterised by extensive use of Greek loan-words.

The Hermeneumata survive in nine manuscripts, mostly from the Middle Ages, one of which attributes the work to Dositheus Magister. For this reason, they are often known as the Hermeneumata Pseudodositheana, although there is not sufficient evidence to attribute them to Dositheus. One of the manuscripts is the Anglo-Saxon Brussels, Bibliothèque Royale MS 1828-30.

== Contents ==
Contents vary dramatically from one manuscript to another, but at its fullest extent the text comprises:

1. An alphabetic glossary including, at its fullest, over 3000 entries.
2. A subject glossary. This thematic glossary contains about 30,000 words, including the names of gods, constellations, temples, holidays, clothing, colors, birds, and trees, as well as military, judicial and financial terms. It does not include vocabulary relating to death or illness. Words are sometimes presented alongside two or three different translated equivalents.
3. Conversation guides. These dialogues (known as the "colloquia") follow the dictionary, and use juvenile language to tell the story of a day in the life of a pupil and his master. There are eight sections: Waking up, school, work, social life, lunch, homework, bathing, dinner, and going to bed.
4. Texts for reading

The Hermeneumata was later adapted, and further Greek vocabulary being added from the Liber glossarum.

The pedagogy of the dialogues is based on the immediate comprehension of extremely simple phrases, most often limited to a subject, verb and complement. There are no grammatical explanations: Conjugations are simply enumerated by way of disconnected sentences which present a variation on a grammatical theme (e.g. pronoun substitution, verb tense).

Example:
Greek	Πρῶτον ἀσπάζομαι τὸν διδάσκαλον, ὃς ἐμὲ ἀντησπάσατο. χαῖρε διδάσκαλε. χαίρετε συμμαθηταί. μαθηταί. συμμαθηταί, τόπον ἐμοὶ δότε ἐμόν. βάθρον. ὑποπόδιον. δίφρος. σύναγέ σε.
Latin	Primum saluto magistrum, qui me resalutavit. ave magister. avete condiscipuli. discipuli. condiscipuli, locum mihi date meum. scamnum. scamellum. sella. densa te.
English	First I greet the master, who greets me in turn. Hello, master. Hello, schoolmates. Students. Schoolmates, give me my place. Bench. Footstool. Chair. Gather around.

== Bibliography ==
- Boucherie (1868). "Étude sur les Hermèneumata du Ms. 306 de la bibliothèque de l'École de Médecine de Montpellier". Comptes rendus des séances de l'Académie des Inscriptions et Belles-Lettres. 12 (1): 270–277. doi:10.3406/crai.1868.67473.
- Gayraud, Michel (2010). "L'apprentissage du grec et du latin dans l'empire romain d'après un manuscrit de la Bibliothèque Universitaire de Montpellier" (PDF). Séance publique du 1er février 2010. Académie des Sciences et Lettres de Montpellier.
- Cammisuli, Salvatore (2021). "La sezione sui colori nel glossario degli Hermeneumata Celtis. Edizione critica e commento". Wiener Studien. 134: 199–221. doi:10.1553/wst134s199. Mordeglia Caterina, Le favole dello pseudo-Dositeo (ms. Paris, BnF, lat. 6503), in Animali sui banchi di scuola (ed. critica), Firenze, SISMEL, Edizioni del Galluzzo, 2017.
