= Guthheard =

9th-century Bishop of Selsey

- Bishop of Selsey
- Appointed: before 845
- Term ended: after 863
- Predecessor: Cynered
- Successor: Wighelm

Personal details
- Died: between 860 and 900
- Denomination: Christian

Guthheard (or Guðheard) was a medieval Bishop of Selsey.

Guthheard's only certain date is 845, when he witnessed a grant by Werenberht to Werheard.

Guthheard may also have witnessed a charter from 860 that was subsequently altered.

Guthheard died after the time period of 860 to 863, and sometime before 900.

== Citations ==
Christian titles
Preceded by Cynered	Bishop of Selsey c. 845 - c. 869	Succeeded by Wighelm
