= Sigeferth of Selsey =

8th-century Bishop of Selsey

Sigeferth
- Bishop of Selsey
- Appointed: before 733
- Term ended: between 747 and 765
- Predecessor: Eolla
- Successor: Aluberht

Orders
- Consecration: 733 by Tatwine

Personal details
- Died: between 747 and 765
- Denomination: Christian

Sigeferth or Sigefirth or Sicgga, was the third Bishop of Selsey, consecrated in 733 by Tatwine, the Archbishop of Canterbury. Sigeferth was still bishop in 747, when he attended the Synod of Clofesho. His date of death was sometime between 747 and 765.

== Citations ==
Christian titles
Preceded by Eolla	Bishops of Selsey; 733–after 747	Succeeded by Aluberht
