= Brihthelm (bishop of Selsey) =

10th-century Bishop of Selsey

- Bishop of Selsey
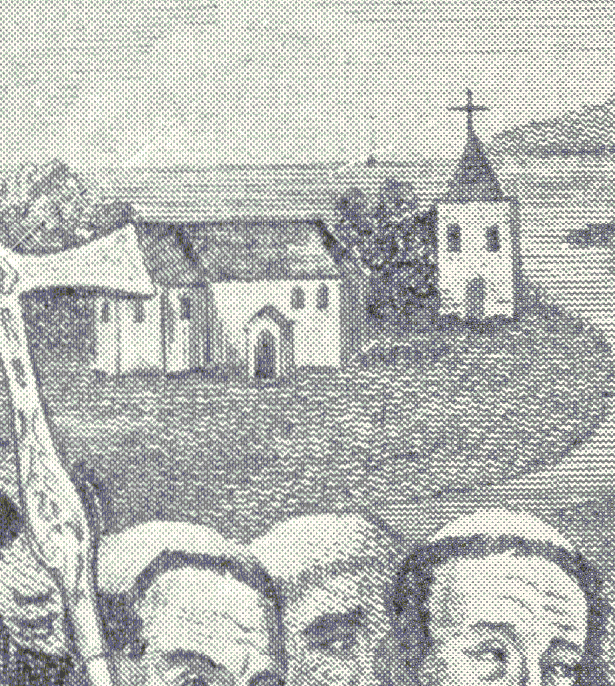
- Tudor representation of monastery founded by Wilfrid
- Appointed: between 953 and 956
- Term ended: between 956 and 963
- Predecessor: Ælfred
- Successor: Eadhelm
- Other post: Trs. ?Winchester (956x963) (Note: The number of Bishops with the name Brihthelm around the 950s has made it difficult to precisely order them. See Keynes discussion in "The Wiley Blackwell Encyclopedia of Anglo-Saxon England" 2nd Ed. Appendix II".)

Personal details
- Died: between 956 and 963
- Denomination: Christian

Brihthelm or Beorhthelm was a Bishop of Selsey.

== Background ==
In 680 or 681 Wilfrid arrived in the kingdom of the South Saxons that was nominally heathen, to evangelise the local population. Their king Æthelwealh of Sussex donated land for Wilfrid to build a monastery. Cædwalla of Wessex conquered the South Saxons in about 685 and is credited with confirming Wilfrid's endowment. Bede says that Wilfrid carried out the duties of a bishop in the land of the South Saxons, although there is no mention of him being the Bishop of the South Saxons. However, Wilfrid is shown as Bishop of Selsey after the episcopal lists were revised and updated during the archiepiscopate of Dunstan(909-988). As Wilfrid was still bishop of Northumbria at the time it is unlikely, as bishops are forbidden by canon law to have more than one see. (Note: The 15th decree of the First Council of Nicaea in 325 was an interdict on invading another Bishops see.) When Wilfrid returned north the South Saxon see was absorbed into the West Saxon diocese. By 705 the West Saxon Diocese had grown to such a size that it became unwieldy so the Selsey diocese was revived. The first bishop being Eadberht who had been the abbot of Wilfrid's monastery.

In the middle years of the tenth century the South Saxon see with its episcopal seat at Selsey, was not thriving. Land from its original endowment was being eroded. In the 940s the local king had given some of the South Saxon see's lands to Brihthelm's predecessor, Bishop Ælfred of Selsey to be his "personal possession" and to bequeath as he chose. (Note: Charter S.506) After Ælfred's death in 953, Selsey was reabsorbed into the West Saxon diocese. Bishop Ælfsige of Winchester, seems to have taken advantage of the interregnum to seize a majority of what remained of Selsey's endowment.

During the 950s there are several English sees that were occupied by bishops named Brihthelm, a name that previously had been fairly rare. Although there are many charter-attestations of bishops named Brihthelm it could be that there was only a limited number of individuals. Possibly as little as two, with Brihthelm of Selsey being one of them. The difficulty in producing a definitive list is due to the sparsity of records for the period.

== Restoration of land ==
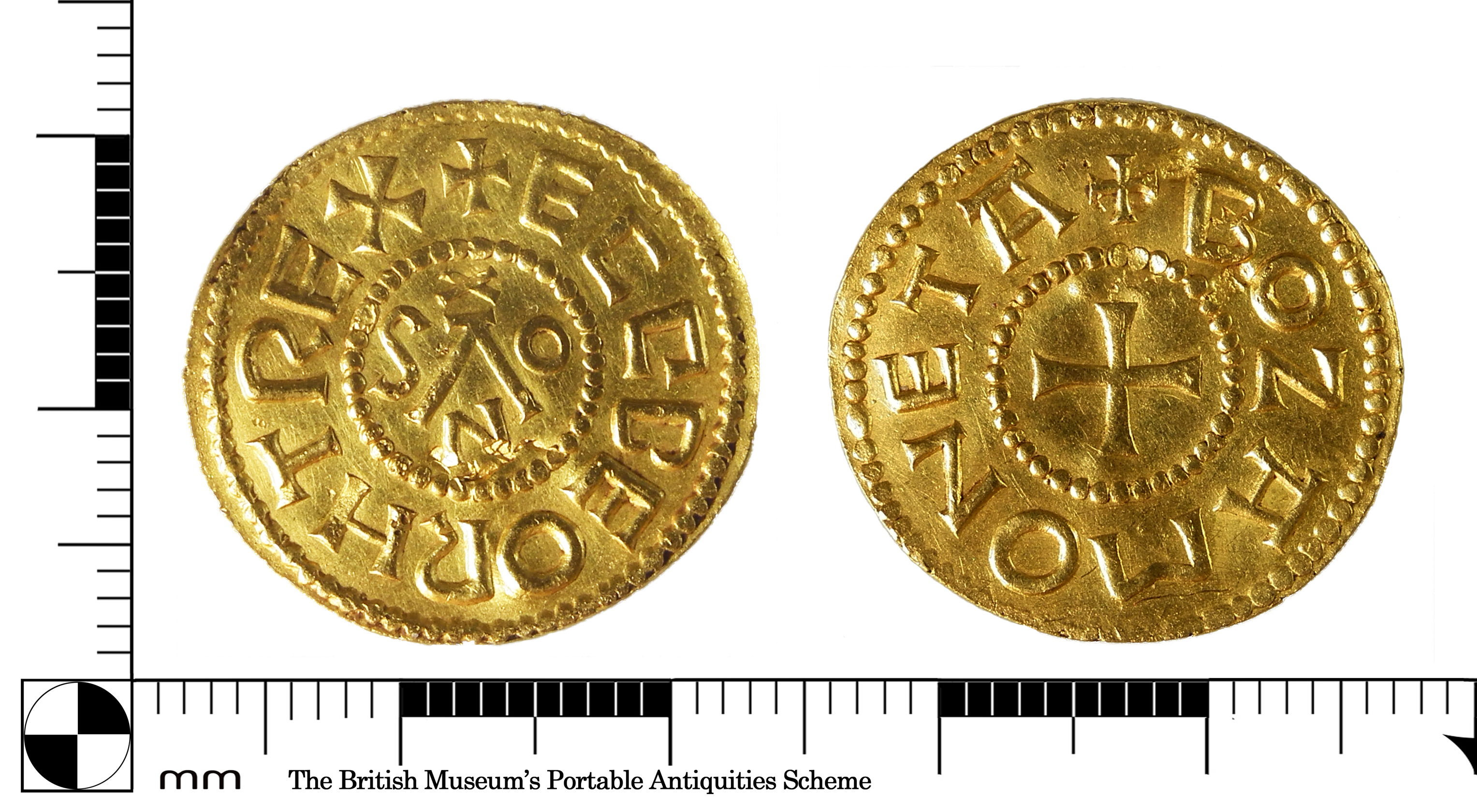
An early-medieval gold mancus of Ecgberht of Wessex (802–839)

When Brihthelm was appointed Bishop of Selsey (possibly suffragan bishop) in 956, because his lands at Selsey had been seized, it appears that he and his chapter may have moved to Chichester for a while as a charter from 956, (Note: Charter S.616) is addressed to the "brethren of Chichester". (Note: Kelly suggests that this speculation may not be secure. The charter is a copy of the original diploma, produced after the see moved to Chichester, so the "brethren of Chichester" statement may just have been an error.) A 957 charter, (Note: Charter S.1291)in Brihthelm's name, indicates how the bishop intended to have lands restored to the South Saxon see that were "uncanonically" seized by Ælfsige. According to the diploma Brihthelm paid one hundred mancuses of pure gold to King Eadwig for the return of the diocesan lands. The lands that Eadwig was to restore were to be enjoyed by Brihthelm in his lifetime and then returned "in perpetuity to the place where the episcopal seat of the South Saxons is situated". The land so returned amounted to almost half of the bishop's holdings at the time of the Domesday survey. The original foundation confirmed by Cædwalla (Note: The foundation charter (S.232 A.D. 673 for ? 683 3 Aug.) is usually regarded as spurious. However, it may be that it was fabricated in Brihthelm's time to support his claim on the land.) to Wilfrid was 87 hides, the restoration was to include 42 hides on the Manhood Peninsula and in excess of another 30 hides from the surrounding districts.

When Ælfsige had been elevated to the archbishopric of Canterbury and Brihthelm possibly transferred to Winchester, (Note: Between 956 and 963 Brihthem possibly died or was transferred to Winchester.) there seems to have been no rush to restore the lands that Brihthelm had paid for.

== Bishop of Winchester ==
Historians have surmised that Brihthelm of Selsey may in fact be the same person as the Bishop of Winchester(960-963). Brihthelm does not appear on any episcopal lists (Note: Episcopal lists were revised and updated during the archiepiscopate of Dunstan (909–988) and for some reason, Brihthelm's name was suppressed. The Dunstan version was the basis for a lot of later lists.) for Selsey and in the charter of 957, Selsey is described as a director cathedral presul episcopali cathedra. (Note: Charter S.1291) It is possible that the Bishop of Winchester "directed" Selsey until it was fully restored as an independent bishopric when Eadhelm was made bishop in 963 before Brihtelm's death.

== Citations ==
Christian titles
Preceded by Ælfred	Bishop of Selsey flourished 950s	Succeeded by Eadhelm
