= De abbatibus =

Latin poem by Æthelwulf

De abbatibus in the Cambridge manuscript

De abbatibus (fully Carmen de abbatibus, meaning "Song of the Abbots") is a Latin poem in eight hundred and nineteen hexameters by the ninth-century English monk Æthelwulf (Ædiluulf), a name meaning "noble wolf", which the author sometimes Latinises as Lupus Clarus. It recounts the history of his monastery (possibly at Bywell, or, less probably, Crayke, twelve miles north of York) from its foundation through its six first abbots and ending with Æthelwulf's two visions. It is addressed to the Bishop of Lindisfarne, Ecgberht, and dates to between 803 and 821.

The poem exists in three manuscripts:

- L: British Library, Cotton MS Tiberius D IV, Part 2, ff. 158v-166r; originally in Winchester Cathedral I, f. 108v. This manuscript also contains a copy of Bede's Historia Ecclesiastica gentis Anglorum, assigned by Plummer to the Winchester group.
- O: Bodleian Library, MS. Bodley 163, ff. 209v-226v.
- C: Cambridge University Library, Ff. 1.27, pp. 203–15.

The poem was first edited by Wilhelm Wattenbach and Ernst Dümmler for the Monumenta Germaniae Historica (1881), but it was based on a bad text from Jean Mabillon. Thomas Arnold produced a superior edition in 1882, but from only two of the manuscripts. Ludwig Traube produced a respected edition of his own, but based on the poor version of Dümmler. The definitive critical edition, based on all three manuscripts, a reinterpreted manuscript history, and critical analysis of Traube's version, was produced in 1967 by Alistair Campbell and included an English translation.

De abbatibus is, like all Anglo-Latin poetry, constructed out of borrowings and imitations, yet it is not completely unoriginal, and though history has at times been subordinated to a literary trope, it is not without eloquence. Prominent among the works on which Æthelwulf relied are those of Virgil, though Dümmler also found references to Ovid and Cyprianus Gallus. The chief Anglo-Latin poets from which Æthelwulf gleaned are Aldhelm, Bede, and Alcuin, whose Versus de Sanctis Euboricensis Ecclesiae may have inspired him to write the De abbatibus. The eighth-century Miracula Nyniae Episcopi was also an influence.

== Literature ==
- Campbell, Alistair, ed. and tr. (1967). Æthelwulf: De Abbatibus. Oxford: Clarendon Press.
- Snook, Ben, Aethilwulf: gidda gemyndig?, Anglo-Saxon 1 (2007), 181-200.
