= Æthelwulf of Selsey =

9th-century Bishop of Selsey

- Bishop of Selsey
- Appointed: before 811
- Term ended: between 816 and 824
- Predecessor: Wihthun
- Successor: Cynered

Personal details
- Died: between 816 and 824
- Denomination: Christian

Æthelwulf (Note: Also Aeðelulf, Aeðeluulf, Aeðelwulf, Atheuulf, Æðelwulf and Æþelwulf)was an Anglo-Saxon Bishop of Selsey.

Æthelwulf was in office in AD811, as he was present at the synod of London in that year. (Note: One of the purposes of the Witenagemot at London (AD811) was to sell lands, in Kent, to Archbishop Wulfred (see charter S168).) He was still active in 816 when he attended the synod of Chelsea. He attested several Anglo-Saxon Charters: (Note: Anglo-Saxon charters listed by Sawyer number)

- S165 - (AD811) Cenwulf granting land to Beornmod.
- S168 - (AD811) Cenwulf selling land to Wulfred.
- S170 - (AD812) Cenwulf granting land to Wulfred.
- S180 - (AD816) Cenwulf granting privileges to Deneberht.
- S201 - (AD851) Beorhtwulf granting land to St Mary's, Worcester. (Note: Most historians believe that charter S201 is spurious.)

Æthelwulf died between 816 and 824.

== Citations ==
Christian titles
Preceded by Wihthun	Bishop of Selsey c. 812-c. 820	Succeeded by Cynered
