= Ælfmær (bishop of Selsey) =

11th-century Bishop of Selsey

- Bishop of Selsey
- Appointed: before 1011
- Term ended: c. 1031
- Predecessor: Ordbriht
- Successor: Æthelric I
- Other post: Abbot of Tavistock

Personal details
- Died: c. 1031
- Denomination: Christian

Ælfmær (died c. 1031) was an Anglo-Saxon Bishop of Selsey.

== Life ==
Perhaps previously a monk at Glastonbury Abbey and then abbot of Tavistock Abbey, Ælfmær was Bishop of Selsey by 1011, and was dead by 1032, when his successor witnessed a charter of King Cnut.

It is curious, however, that Ælfmær supposedly attested a charter of Cnut dated 1033. The probable explanation is that Ælfmær witnessed the conveyance itself, which took place in 1032, but the charter recording the transaction was not prepared until 1033.

According to the Handbook of British Chronology, Ælfmær became bishop between 1007 and 1011, and died about 1031.

== Citations ==
Christian titles
| Preceded by Ordbriht | Bishop of Selsey c. 1009–c. 1031 | Succeeded by Æthelric I |
