= Bishop of Chichester =

Diocesan bishop in the Church of England

- Bishopric

anglican
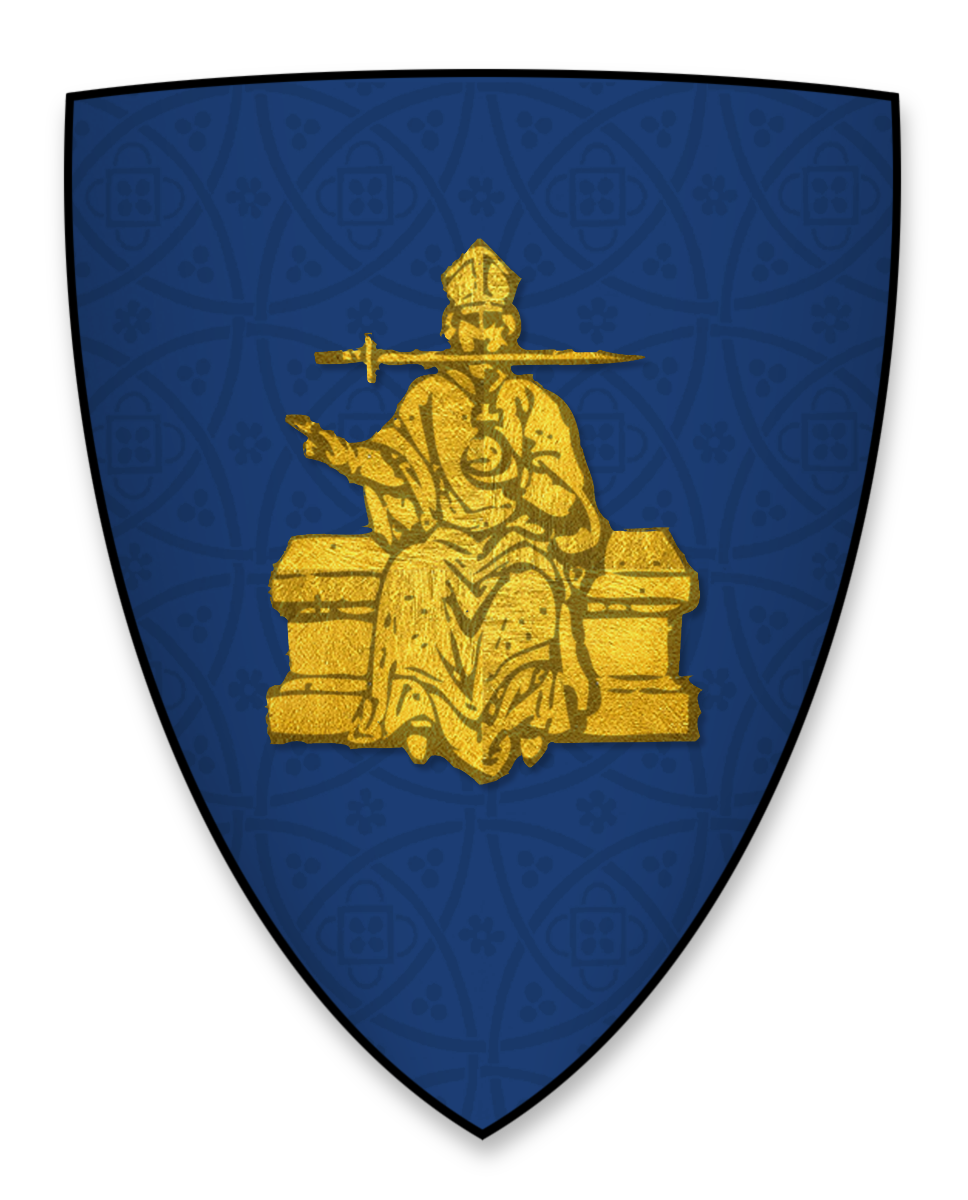
- Arms of the Bishop of Chichester: Azure, Our Blessed Lord in judgement seated on His throne His right hand upraised or His left hand holding an open book proper and out of His mouth a two-edged sword point to the sinister gules)
- Incumbent; Vacant

Location
- Ecclesiastical province: Canterbury
- Residence: The Palace, Chichester

Information
- First holder: Wilfrid (as Bishop of Selsey); Stigand (as Bishop of Chichester)
- Established: 681 (founded at Selsey); 1075 (translated to Chichester)
- Diocese: Chichester
- Cathedral: Chichester Cathedral (since 1075); Selsey Abbey (681–1075)

The Bishop of Chichester is the ordinary of the Church of England Diocese of Chichester in the Province of Canterbury. The diocese covers the counties of East and West Sussex. The see is based in the City of Chichester where the bishop's seat is located at the Cathedral Church of the Holy Trinity. The bishop's residence is The Palace, Chichester. Since 2015, the diocesan bishop has also fulfilled the diocesan-wide role of alternative episcopal oversight, following the decision by Mark Sowerby, then Bishop of Horsham, to recognise the orders of priests and bishops who are women.

Between 1984 and 2013, the Bishop of Chichester, in addition to being the diocesan bishop, also had specific oversight of the Chichester Episcopal Area (the then Archdeaconry of Chichester), which covered the coastal region of West Sussex along with Brighton and Hove.

== Earliest history at Selsey ==
The episcopal see at Selsey was founded by Saint Wilfrid, formerly Bishop of the Northumbrians, for the Anglo-Saxon Kingdom of Sussex in the late 7th century. He was granted land by Æthelwealh of Sussex to build a cathedral at Selsey. However, shortly afterwards Cædwalla of Wessex conquered the Kingdom of Sussex, but he confirmed the grant to Wilfrid. The bishop's seat was located at Selsey Abbey. Nine years after the Norman Conquest, in 1075, the Council of London enacted that episcopal sees should be removed to cities or larger towns. Accordingly, the see at Selsey was removed to Chichester. Some sources claim that Stigand, the last Bishop of Selsey, continued to use the title Bishop of Selsey until 1082, before adopting the new title Bishop of Chichester, indicating that the transfer took several years to complete.

850–925

950–1035

The dioceses of Anglo-Saxon England 850–1035

== List of bishops ==
Bishops of Selsey
From	Until	Incumbent	Notes
? 681	? 685	Saint Wilfrid	Founder of the see; status as bishop of this see disputed; previously ejected from York; later Bishop of Leicester then of Hexham.
c. 685	c. 706	See absorbed by Winchester diocese, after Wessex conquered Sussex under Cædwalla.	
? betw. 706–716	betw. 716–731	Eadberht	Also recorded as Eadbeorht, Eadbertus; previously Abbot of Selsey Abbey; often deemed first bishop of this see; died in office.
betw. 716–731	betw. 716–731	Eolla	Died in office.
betw. 716–731	733	See vacant	
733	betw. 747–765	Sigeferth	Also recorded as Sigelmus, Sigfridus, Sigga, Siggca, Sicgga; died in office.
betw. 747–765	betw. 772–780	Aluberht	Also recorded as Ealabeorht, Alubrithus, Alubertus; died in office.
betw. 747–765	betw. 772–780	Oswald	Also recorded as Osweald, Osa; died in office.
betw. 772–780	betw. 781–787	Gislhere	Also recorded as Giselherus; died in office.
betw. 781–787	betw. 786–789	Tota	Died in office.
betw. 787–789	betw. 805–811	Wihthun	Died in office.
betw. 805–811	betw. 816–824	Æthelwulf	Also recorded as Ethelulphus; died in office.
betw. 816–824	betw. 839–845	Cynered	Also recorded as Coenred, Coenredus; died in office.
betw. 839–845	aft. 860	Guthheard	Also recorded as Guthard, Guðheard; left office.
aft. 860	bef. 900	See possibly vacant	
bef. 900	c. 909, or betw. 909–925	Wighelm	Died in office.
c. 909, or betw. 909–925	930 or 931	Beornheah	Also recorded as Beornegus; died in office; in Heylyn is placed between Ethelulphus and Coenredus.
930 or 931	betw. 940–943	Wulfhun	Omitted in Heylyn; died in office.
betw. 940–943	betw. 953–956	Ælfred	Also recorded as Alfredus; died in office.
betw. 953–956	betw. 956–963	Brihthelm	Sometimes identified with Beorhthelm of Winchester; either died in office or translated to Winchester.
betw. 956–963	979 or 980	Eadhelm	Died in office.
980	988	Æthelgar	Translated to Canterbury.
betw. 988–990	betw. 1007–1009	Ordbriht	Died in office.
betw. 1007–1011	1031 or 1032	Ælfmær	Died in office.
1032 or 1033	1038	Æthelric (I)	Died in office.
1039	1047	Grimketel	Also recorded as Grimcytel (also Grimkell in Scandinavian sources); listed as Bishop of Elmham for 1043 as well; died in office.
1047	1057	Heca	Died in office.
1058	1070	Æthelric (II)	Also recorded as Ethelric; deposed and imprisoned by William the Conqueror.
1070	c. 1075	Stigand	See moved to Chichester by decree of the Council of London (1075), Stigand was the last Bishop of Selsey and first Bishop of Chichester.
Pre-Reformation Bishops of Chichester
From	Until	Incumbent	Notes
c. 1075	1087	Stigand of Selsey	Hitherto Bishop of Selsey; died in office.
1088	1088	Godfrey	Some sources cite William as bishop. Godfrey; died in office.
1091	1123	Ralph de Luffa	Radulphus; died in office.
1125	1145	Seffrid (I)	Seffridus Pelochin; also Abbot of Glastonbury; deprived.
1147	1169	Hilary	Date of consecration sometimes given as 1133; previously unsuccessfully nominated for York; died in office.
1169	1173	See vacant	
1173	1180	John of Greenford	John de Greenford; previously Dean of Chichester; died in office.
1180	1204	Seffrid (II)	Seffridus; died in office.
1204	1207	Simon of Wells	Simon Sutwell, Simon FitzRobert, Simon de Camera; died in office.
1209	1214	Nicholas de Aquila	Gilbert de l'Aigle; Dean of Chichester; election quashed.
1215	1217	Richard Poore	Previously Dean of Salisbury; translated to Salisbury then Durham.
1217	1222	Ranulf of Wareham	Ralph de Warham; previously Prior of Norwich; died in office.
1224	1244	Ralph Neville	Also Lord Chancellor; elected to Canterbury but rejected by Pope Innocent IV; also unsuccessfully elected to Winchester; died in office.
1244		Robert Passelewe	Archdeacon of Lewes; Henry III's favoured candidate; election declared void by Pope Innocent IV.
1244	1253	Saint Richard	Richard de Wych; Archbishop Boniface's favoured candidate; election confirmed by Pope Innocent IV; died in office.
1253	1262	John Climping	John of Arundel; previously Chancellor of Chichester; died in office.
1262	1287	Stephen Bersted	Stephen of Pagham; died in office.
1288	1305	Gilbert of St Leonard	Gilbert de Sancto Leofardo; previously Treasurer of Chichester; died in office.
1305	1337	John Langton	Also Lord Chancellor; previous election to Ely quashed; died in office.
1337	1362	Robert de Stratford	Previously Archdeacon of Canterbury; also Lord Chancellor and Chancellor of Oxford; died in office.
1362	1368	William Lenn	William Lullimore; previously Dean of Chichester; translated to Worcester.
1369	1385	William Reade	Previously Archdeacon of Rochester; died in office.
1386	1389	Thomas Rushhook	Thomas Rushocke; translated from Llandaff; exiled to Breifne.
1390	1395	Richard Mitford	Previously unsuccessfully elected to St David's; also Lord Treasurer of Ireland; translated to Salisbury.
1395	1396	Robert Waldby	Translated from Dublin; translated to York.
1396	1415	Robert Reed	Translated from Carlisle; died in office.
1417		Stephen Patrington	Translated from St David's; died immediately after appointment.
1418	1420	Henry Ware	Previously official to the Archbishop of Canterbury; died in office.
1421	1421	John Kemp	Translated from Rochester; translated to London.
1421	1426	Thomas Polton	Thomas Pulton; translated from Hereford; translated to Worcester.
1426	1429	John Rickingale	Chancellor of York; died in office.
1429		Thomas Brunce	Thomas Brouns; election quashed; later Bishop of Rochester then of Norwich.
1430	1438	Simon Sydenham	Simon Sidenham; died in office.
1438	1445	Richard Praty	Richard Pratty; also Chancellor of Oxford.
1446	1450	Adam Moleyns	Adam Molins; previously Dean of Salisbury; also Lord Privy Seal; died in office.
1450	1459	Reginald Pecock	Reginald Peacock; translated from St Asaph; deprived for heresy.
1459	1477	John Arundel	Previously Archdeacon of Richmond.
1478	1503	Edward Story	Translated from Carlisle.
1503	1506	Richard FitzJames	Translated from Rochester; translated to London.
1508	1536	Robert Sherborne	Robert Sherburne; translated from St David's; resigned shortly before his death.
Bishops of Chichester during the Reformation
From	Until	Incumbent	Notes
1536	1543	Richard Sampson	Previously Dean of Lichfield; also Dean of St Paul's; translated to Lichfield & Coventry.
1543	1551	George Day	Provost of King's College, Cambridge; deprived by Edward VI.
1552	1553	John Scory	Translated from Rochester; deprived by Mary I; later Bishop of Hereford.
1553	1556	George Day (restored)	Restored by Mary I; died in office.
1557	1558	John Christopherson	Previously Dean of Norwich; died in office.
Post-Reformation Bishops of Chichester
From	Until	Incumbent	Notes
1559	1568	William Barlow	Marian exile; had resigned Bath and Wells (being married); died in office.
1570	1582	Richard Curteys	Richard Curtis; died in office.
1582	1586	See vacant	
1586	1596	Thomas Bickley	Previously Warden of Merton College, Oxford.
1596	1605	Anthony Watson	Previously Lord High Almoner; also Dean of Bristol 1590–1598; died in office.
1605	1609	Lancelot Andrewes	Previously Master of Pembroke College, Cambridge; translated to Ely then Winchester.
1609	1619	Samuel Harsnett	Previously Archdeacon of Essex; translated to Norwich then York.
1619	1628	George Carleton	Translated from Llandaff; died in office.
1628	1638	Richard Montagu	Previously Archdeacon of Hereford; translated to Norwich.
1638	1641	Brian Duppa	Previously Dean of Christ Church, Oxford; translated to Salisbury.
1642	1646	Henry King	Previously Dean of Rochester; deprived of the see when the English episcopy was abolished by Parliament on 9 October 1646.
1646	1660	The see was abolished during the Commonwealth and the Protectorate.	
1660	1669	Henry King (restored)	Reinstated on the restoration of the episcopacy; died in office.
1670	1675	Peter Gunning	Previously Master of St John's College, Cambridge; also Regius Professor of Divinity 1661–1674; translated to Ely.
1675	1678	Ralph Brideoake	Previously Dean of Salisbury; died in office.
1679	1685	Guy Carleton	Translated from Bristol; died in office.
1685	1689	John Lake	Translated from Bristol; deprived as a non-juror.
1689	1691	Simon Patrick	Previously Dean of Peterborough; translated to Ely.
1691	1696	Robert Grove	Previously Archdeacon of Middlesex; died in office.
1696	1709	John Williams	Died in office.
1709	1722	Thomas Manningham	Previously Dean of Windsor; died in office.
1722	1724	Thomas Bowers	Also Archdeacon of Canterbury since 1721.
1724	1731	Edward Waddington	Died in office.
1731	1740	Francis Hare	Translated from St Asaph.
1740	1754	Matthias Mawson	Translated from Llandaff; translated to Ely.
1754	1797	Sir William Ashburnham, Bt.	Previously Dean of Chichester.
1798	1824	John Buckner	Sometime Rector of St Giles, London; died in office.
1824	1831	Robert Carr	Previously Dean of Hereford; translated to Worcester.
1831	1836	Edward Maltby	Translated to Durham.
1836	1840	William Otter	Previously Principal of King's College, London; died in office.
1840	1842	Philip Shuttleworth	Previously Warden of New College, Oxford; died in office.
1842	1870	Ashurst Gilbert	Previously Principal of Brasenose College, Oxford; died in office.
1870	1895	Richard Durnford	Previously Archdeacon of Manchester; died in office.
1896	1907	Ernest Wilberforce	Translated from Newcastle; died in office.
1908	1919	Charles Ridgeway	Previously Dean of Carlisle.
1919	1929	Winfrid Burrows	Translated from Truro; died in office.
1929	1958	George Bell	Previously Dean of Canterbury; died in office.
1958	1974	Roger Wilson	Translated from Wakefield; retired.
1974	2001	Eric Kemp	Previously Dean of Worcester; retired and became "Bishop Emeritus of Chichester".
2001	2012	John Hind	Translated from Europe; retired.
2012	2026	Martin Warner	Translated from Whitby; retired.

== Assistant bishops ==
Among those who were called Assistant Bishop of Chichester, or coadjutor bishop, were:

- 1930 – 1937 (d.): Henry Southwell, Canon Precentor of Chichester Cathedral and Provost of Lancing College, former Bishop of Lewes
- 1939 – 1953 (ret.): Charles Saunders, Rector of Uckfield (until 1942), of Barcombe (1942–47) and Vicar of West Lavington (from 1947); former Bishop in Lucknow
- 1965–1980 (d.): Ambrose Reeves, Rector of Lewes (until 1972) and former Anglican Bishop of Johannesburg
- 1966: Nathaniel Newnham Davis, former Bishop of Antigua
- 1994 – 1997 (res.): David Evans, Gen. Sec. of SAMS and former Bishop in Peru

== See also ==
- Archdeacon of Chichester
- Archdeacon of Hastings
- Archdeacon of Brighton and Lewes

== Sources ==
- Heylyn, Peter (1773). A Help to English History...etc.. London: Paul Wright.
- Kelly, S. E. 1998. Charters of Selsey. Anglo-Saxon Charters 6.
