= Æthelgar =

Archbishop of Canterbury from 988 to 990, Christian saint

- Archbishop of Canterbury
- Appointed: 988
- Term ended: 13 February 990
- Predecessor: Dunstan
- Successor: Sigeric
- Other post: Bishop of Selsey (980–988)

Orders
- Consecration: 2 May 980

Personal details
- Died: 13 February 990

Æthelgar (died 990) was Archbishop of Canterbury, and previously Bishop of Selsey.

== Biography ==
Æthelgar was a monk at Glastonbury Abbey before he was the discipulus of Aethelwold the Bishop of Winchester. He then continued as a monk at Abingdon Abbey, until 964 when he was appointed Abbot of the newly reformed monastery of New Minster, Winchester, by Bishop Aethelwold. He was consecrated Bishop of Selsey on 2 May 980. He succeeded Dunstan as Archbishop of Canterbury, but "lived for a short time after that – no more than a year and three months". He was transferred to Canterbury in 988. He may have continued to hold his abbacy along with his bishopric and archbishopric until his death. Æthelgar died on 13 February 990.

While archbishop, Æthelgar received two letters from monasteries in Flanders, seeking support and prayers from Æthelgar. One was from the Falrad, the abbot of Saint Vaast Abbey, which requested that relations between the abbey and Canterbury remain good, as they had in Dunstan's time, and implies that Falrad had given verbal instructions to the messenger carrying the letter to seek further support on other issues. The second letter was from Odbert, the abbot of Saint Bertin Abbey, and congratulates Æthelgar on becoming archbishop and solicits financial aid for his monastery.

== Citations ==
Christian titles
Preceded by Eadhelm	Bishop of Selsey; 980–988	Succeeded by Ordbriht
Preceded by Dunstan	Archbishop of Canterbury c. 988–990	Succeeded by Sigeric
