= Tota (bishop) =

8th-century Bishop of Selsey

- Bishop of Selsey
- Appointed: between 781 and 786
- Term ended: between 786 and 789
- Predecessor: Gislhere
- Successor: Wihthun

Orders
- Consecration: between 781 and 786

Personal details
- Died: between 786 and 789
- Denomination: Christian

Tota (Note: Also Thoha, Totta, or Toha) was a Bishop of Selsey when Sussex was being ruled by Offa of Mercia.

Not very much is known of Tota but he is recorded as present at a church council (Synod of Calcuthiens) attended by papal legates in 786. (Note: In 786, Pope Hadrian sent his legates George, bishop of Ostia, and Theophylact, bishop of Todi, to England, to investigate the state of the English church and root out any heresy that might be found there. A report of the legates survives. It includes Tota's name, in the subscription list.) He was consecrated between 781 and 786.

Tota died between 786 and 789.

== Citations ==
Christian titles
Preceded by Gislhere	Bishop of Selsey	Succeeded by Wihthun
