= Beornheah =

10th-century Bishop of Selsey

- Bishop of Selsey
- Appointed: 909
- Term ended: between 930 and 931
- Predecessor: Wighelm
- Successor: Wulfhun

Orders
- Consecration: c. 909 by Plegmund

Personal details
- Died: between 930 and 931
- Denomination: Christian

Beornheah was a Bishop of Selsey.

Beornheah is said to have been consecrated by Archbishop Plegmund on the same day as six other bishops, about 909. In 930 Beornheah received a grant from King Athelstan.

Beornheah died between 930 and 931.

== Citations ==
Christian titles
| Preceded by Wighelm | Bishop of Selsey c. 909 - c. 930 | Succeeded by Wulfhun |
