= Timeline of Sussex history =

This is a timeline of Sussex history. To read about the background to these events, see History of Sussex. See also the list of monarchs of Sussex.

== 1st century ==
Year	Date	Event	Reference
c. 15		Verica succeeds Eppillus as king of the southern Atrebates (approximately modern Sussex and south-east Hampshire) with a capital at or close to what went on to become the Roman Noviomagus Reginorum (modern Chichester)	
by 42		Caratacus, king of the Catuvellauni tribe, conquers the southern Atrebatic kingdom and expels Verica.	
c.43		Romans land on Sussex coast as part of the Roman conquest of Britain, perhaps in support of Verica. Under Roman rule the client kingdom of the Regni or Regnenses is created from the southern Atrebatic kingdom for Cogidubnus that includes much of what is to become Sussex.	
c.75		The largest Roman residence north of the Alps is built close to what is now Chichester Harbour	
c.80		Kingdom of Regni or Regnenses, becomes a Roman canton or civitas with its capital at Noviomagus Reginorum (modern Chichester).	

== 2nd century ==
Year	Date	Event	Reference
121/122		A stone statue, perhaps the largest in Roman Britain, is erected at what is now Chichester Harbour	
c.150		Ptolemy's Geography mentions several places in what was to become Sussex including Magnus Portus, Noeomagus (Noviomagus Reginorum), Novus Portus and the Flavius Trisantona (River Arun).	
c.190		Construction begins on a Romano-British villa just north of the South Downs, close to Stane Street	

== 3rd century ==
Roman masonry in the walls of Anderitum

Year	Date	Event	Reference
c.200-250		Beachy Head Lady buried at East Dean, the first known person of sub-Saharan origin in Britain.	
c.293-300		The Romans build the Saxon Shore fort of Anderitum at Pevensey	

== 5th century ==
Year	Date	Event	Reference
c.410		Romans leave Britain	
460s onwards		Hoard of coins deposited at what is now Patching.	
c.477		Aelle arrived at Cymenshore; Aelle goes on to become the first king of Sussex and the first Bretwalda.	
485		Battle of Mercredesburne	
491		Siege of Anderitum in modern Pevensey.	

== 6th century ==
Year	Date	Event	Reference
c.500		The beginning of the Heptarchy, which includes the Kingdom of Sussex.	

== 7th century ==
Year	Date	Event	Reference
607		Ceolwulf of Wessex fights the South Saxons	
661		King Æthelwealh of Sussex becomes Christian and his territory expands westwards to include the Meon Valley and the Isle of Wight.	
c. 679		Sussex is affected by famine.	
681		St Wilfrid arrives in Sussex.	
c.681		Selsey Abbey founded.	
685-686		Cædwalla of Wessex invades Sussex, killing King Æthelwealh of Sussex.	
686		South Saxons attack Hlothere, king of Kent, in support of Hlothere's nephew Eadric.	
c.7th century		Sussex appears in the Tribal Hidage.	

== 8th century ==
Year	Date	Event	Reference
c.700		Parts of Sussex are mentioned in the Ravenna Cosmography including Nouiomago or Nauimago regentium (Chichester) and Anderito (Pevensey).	
710		King Nunna of Sussex and King Ine of Wessex clash with King Geraint of Dumnonia (Devon and Cornwall).	
c.715		Eadberht, Abbot of Selsey is consecrated the first bishop of the South Saxons.	
771		King Offa of Mercia defeats the Haestingas and adds their kingdom to the Kingdom of Sussex.	

== 9th century ==
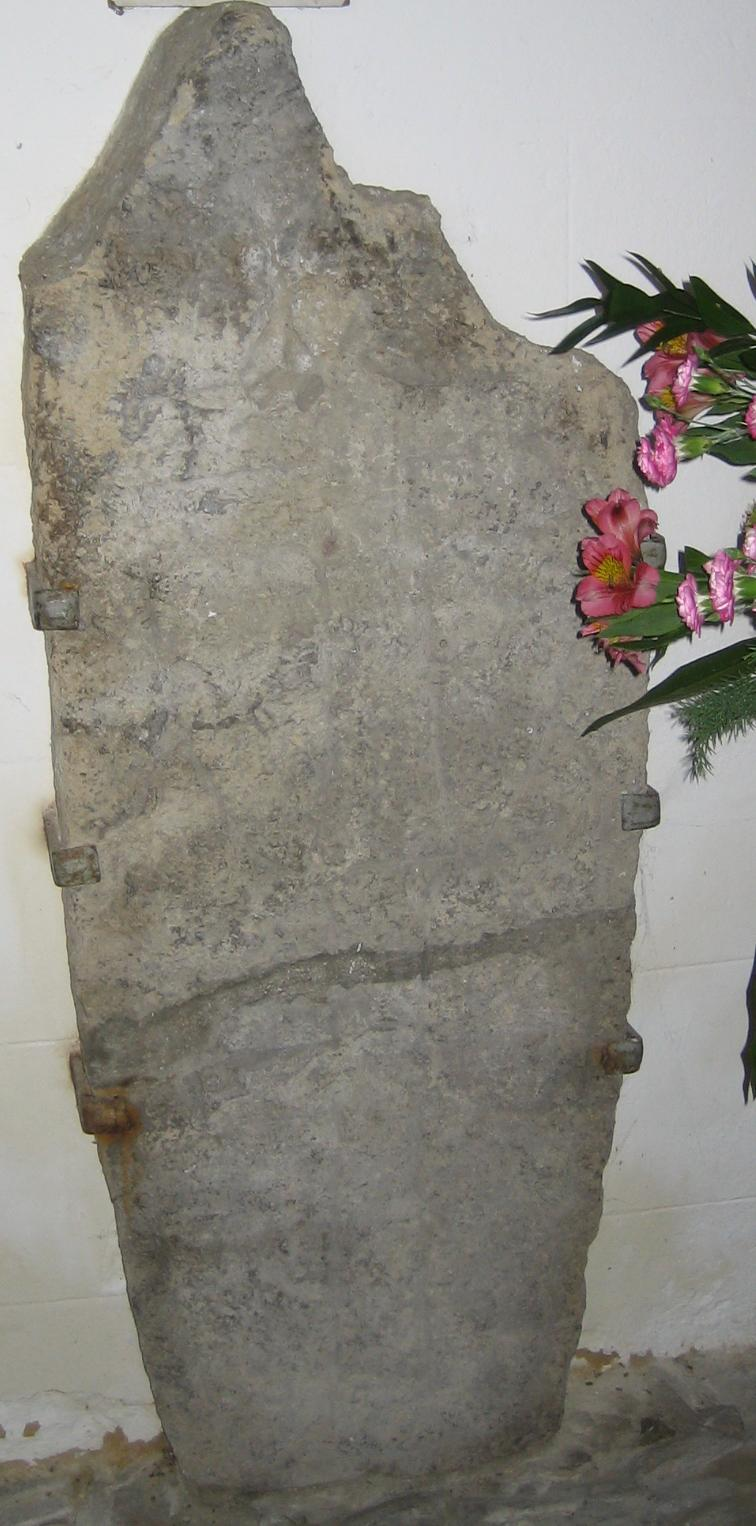
Tombstone of Æthelwulf of Wessex, buried in 858 at Steyning

Year	Date	Event	Reference
c.827		Sussex annexed by Kingdom of Wessex	
828		Historia Brittonum is written, which refers to the "Night of the Long Knives" in which Sussex is ceded by sub-Roman authorities to Saxons.	
839		Æthelstan becomes "King of the Dwellers in Kent, of the East Saxons, of the South Saxons and of Surrey" on the authority of his father, Æthelwulf of Wessex.	
858		Æthelwulf of Wessex buried at Steyning.	
860		Æthelberht of Wessex becomes king of Wessex. Sussex, together with Essex, Kent and Surrey, is fully subsumed as part of this kingdom.	
885		King Alfred meets his biographer, Asser, for the first time at Alfred's royal estate at Dean in Sussex.	

== 10th century ==
Year	Date	Event	Reference
After 915		The Burghal Hidage lists five burhs (fortified towns or forts) in Sussex at Chichester, Burpham, Lewes, Hastings and Eorpeburnan	
927		Æthelstan styles himself as King of the English, becoming the first king to do so.	
930	3 April	England-wide Royal Council (Witenagemot) takes place at Lyminster, included King Æthelstan and his councillors.	
994		Vikings commanded by Olaf Tryggvason and Sweyn Forkbeard raid the coast of Sussex.	

== 11th century ==
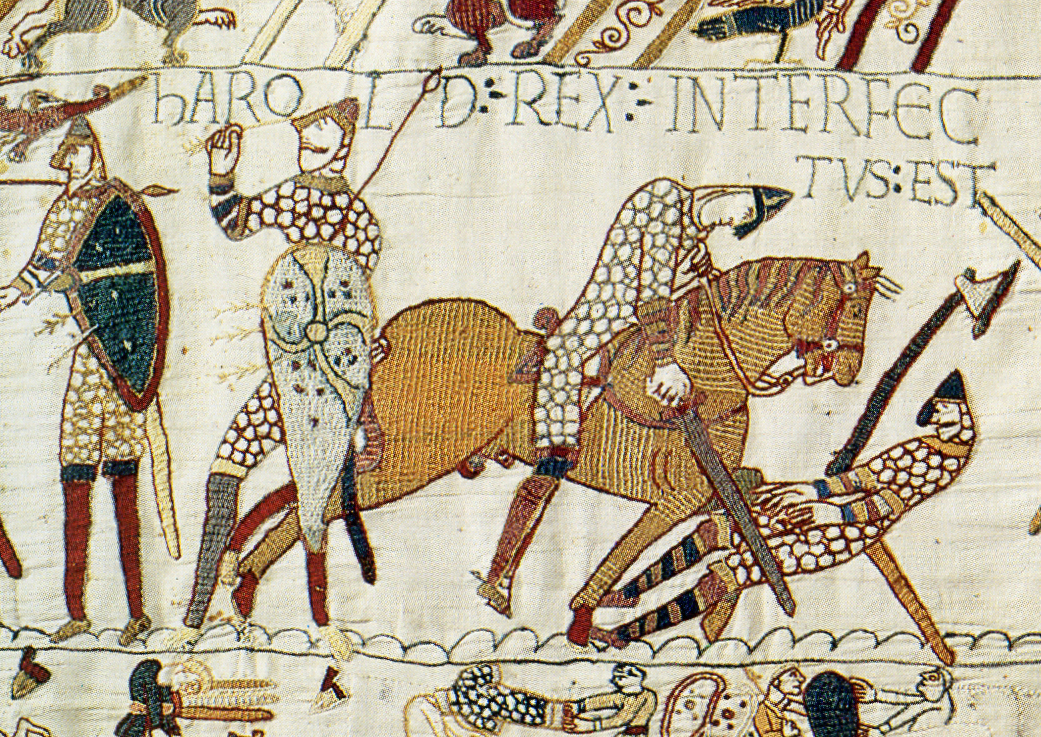
Scene from the Bayeux Tapestry depicting the death of King Harold at the Battle of Hastings

Year	Date	Event	Reference
1011		The last Viking raid on Sussex takes place at Hastings. Later in the same year, Sussex is ruled by the Danes	
1049		Sweyn Godwinson abducts his cousin Beorn at Bosham and later murders him.	
1064		Harold Godwinson sets sail for Normandy from Bosham.	
1066	September	William of Normandy lands at Pevensey.	
1066	14 October	Battle of Hastings at Senlac Hill.	
1075		The Council of London decrees that the bishopric for Sussex should be moved from Selsey Abbey to a new cathedral at Chichester.	
1088		Rebellion of 1088: William II captures the rebel leader Odo of Bayeux in a six-week siege at Pevensey Castle.	
1090		First mention of Church in the wood Hollington, Saint Leonards on Sea	

== 12th century ==
The coat of arms of Hastings, shows a motif that features widely in the heraldry of the Cinque Ports

Year	Date	Event	Reference
1107		Henry I of England grants Bishop Ralph de Luffa the right to hold a fair in Chichester, which becomes known as the Sloe Fair.	
1108		Chichester Cathedral is consecrated under Bishop Ralph de Luffa.	
1139		Siege of Arundel - part of the events of the Anarchy.	
1155		Earliest known charter of the Cinque Ports, included Hastings and later Rye, Winchelsea and Seaford.	
1187		Fire destroys Chichester Cathedral and much of the city of Chichester.	
1194		While Richard the Lionheart is held captive in France, King John's forces lay siege to Chichester Castle.	
1199		Chichester Cathedral is re-consecrated under Bishop Seffrid II.	

== 13th century ==
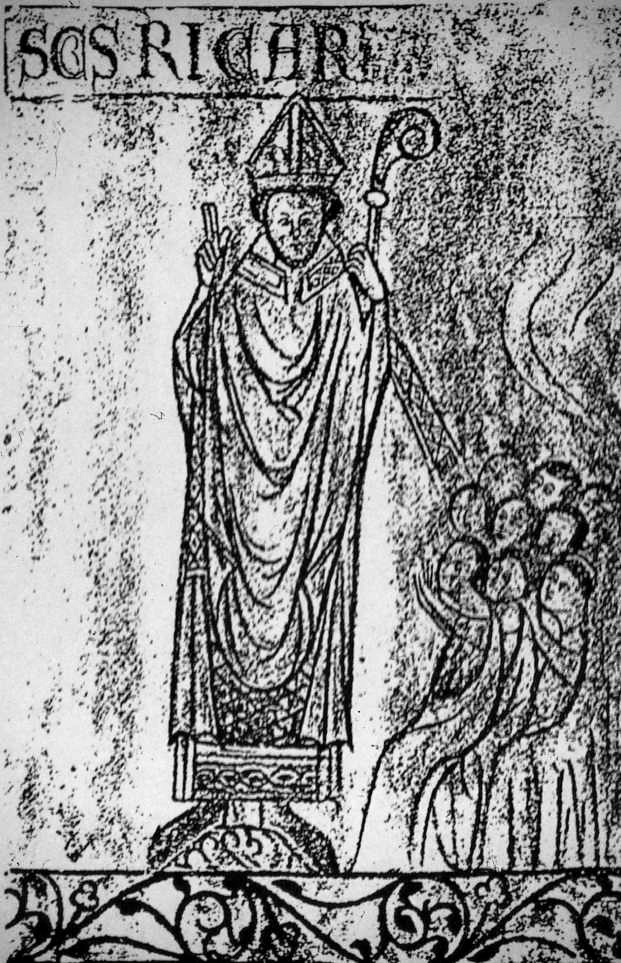
A medieval wall painting of St Richard of Chichester

Year	Date	Event	Reference
1208		King John confiscates Bramber Castle from the de Braose family, after suspecting them of treachery.	
1215	22 January	While King John visits Knepp Castle for 4 days, confederated barons assemble in London to determine how best to check the career of this vicious king.	
1216		in part of the First Barons' War, Rye and Winchelsea open their gates to Prince Louis of France in an unsuccessful bid to take the crown from the hated King John	
1216		Chichester Castle is attacked and occupied by Prince Louis of France.	
1217		A force of Wealdsmen led by William of Cassingham ambushes Prince Louis of France and his men at Lewes, pursuing them to Winchelsea.	
1225		Chichester Castle is demolished so that it cannot be used again by French forces	
1250-1262		The Rape of Chichester is created, the last of Sussex's six sub-divisions, known as Rapes.	
1262		Pope Urban IV canonises St Richard of Chichester, former bishop of Chichester and now Sussex's patron saint.	
1264	14 May	Battle of Lewes	
1287	February	Old Winchelsea completely destroyed by flood.	

== 14th century ==
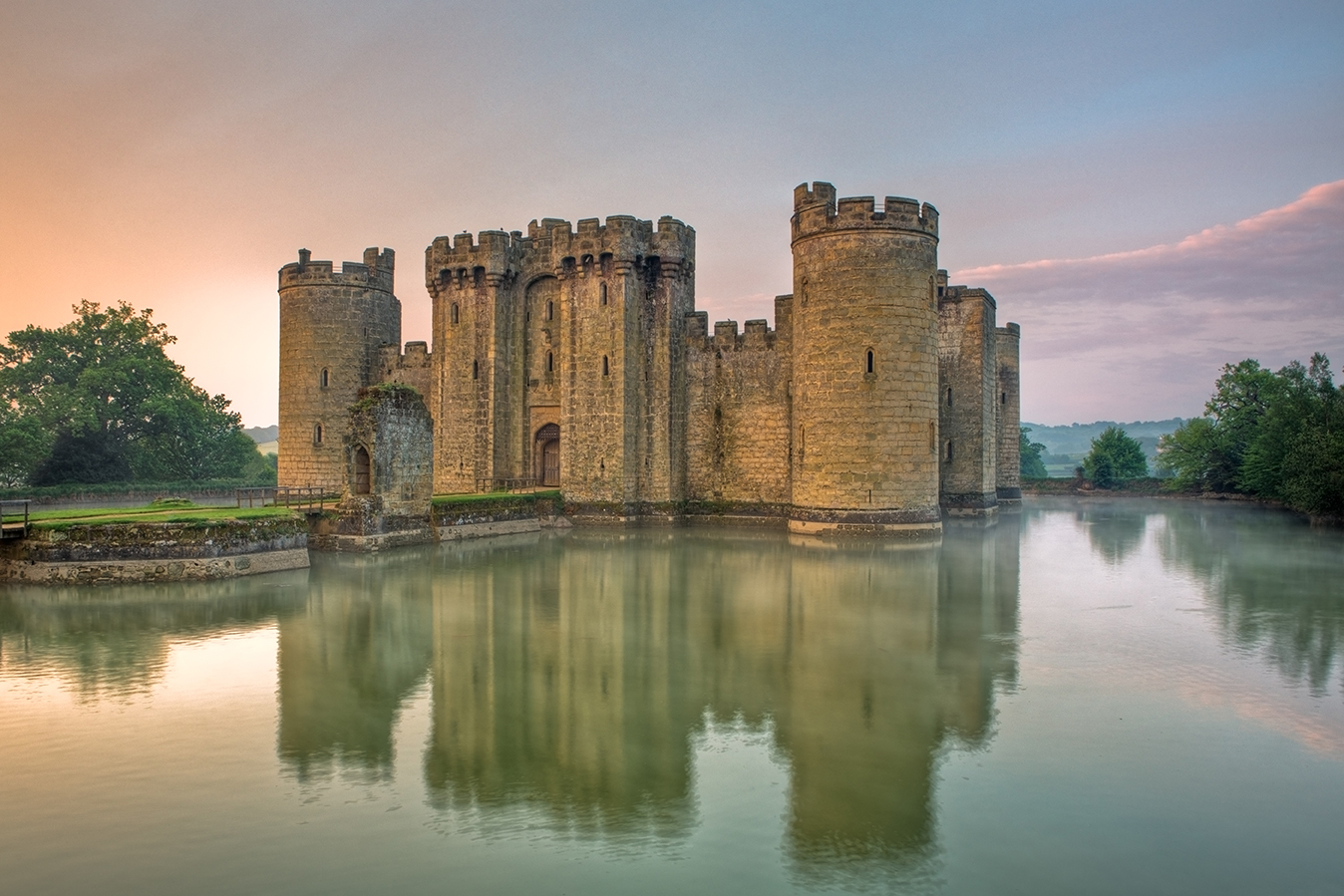
Bodiam Castle was constructed in 1385

Year	Date	Event	Reference
1315		The Great Famine of 1315–17 brings a relatively large increase in mortality in Sussex and across much of northern Europe.	
1336		Edward III decides to site the county court for Sussex at Chichester.	
1338		Start of the English Channel naval campaign, part of the Hundred Years' War, saw the unwalled Hastings burnt to the ground.	
1348		Over the next 20 years the Black Death kills perhaps half of the population of Sussex.	
1350	29 August	Battle of Winchelsea	
1353		Chichester is named as the staple port for Sussex in the Statute of the Staple.	
1377	10 December	Bishop William Reade receives permission to fortify Amberley Castle.	
1381		Peasants' Revolt: people from Sussex participate in riots in London; Lewes Castle is sacked;	
1385		Work begins on Bodiam Castle	

== 15th century ==
Year	Date	Event	Reference
1406		James I of Scotland is imprisoned in Pevensey Castle, where Henry IV of England provided for his education.	
1419		Joan of Navarre, dowager Queen of England, is imprisoned in Pevensey Castle for the next three years after her step-son Henry V accuses her of planning to destroy the king by sorcery	
1450	June	Rebels involved in Jack Cade's Rebellion assemble outside London.	
1450	12 July	Jack Cade fatally wounded at Cade Street.	
1451	Easter week	John and William Merfold indicted after publicly inciting the killing of the nobility, clergy, the deposition of King Henry VI and advocating rule by common people.	

== 16th century ==
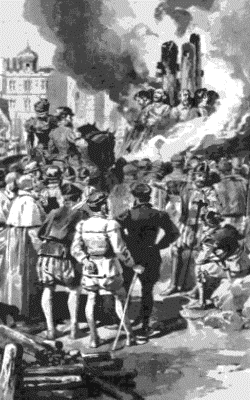
Depiction of martyrdom of Richard Woodman and nine others who were burned in Lewes

Year	Date	Event	Reference
1504		A statute is passed to alternate the court of the High Sheriff of Sussex between Chichester and Lewes.	
1538	20 December	Shrine of St Richard destroyed following a royal order from Henry VIII.	
1545	20 July	After the Battle of the Solent, the French Navy landed at Brighton and Newhaven but is repulsed.	
1555-1557		As part of the Marian Persecutions, a significant number of men are martyred for their Protestant faith, including 17 men burnt alive in Lewes.	
c.1562		First Huguenot community arrived at Rye, arriving at Winchelsea the following year.	
1588	1 October	Ralph Crockett and Edward James executed in Chichester for being Catholic priests.	

== 17th century ==
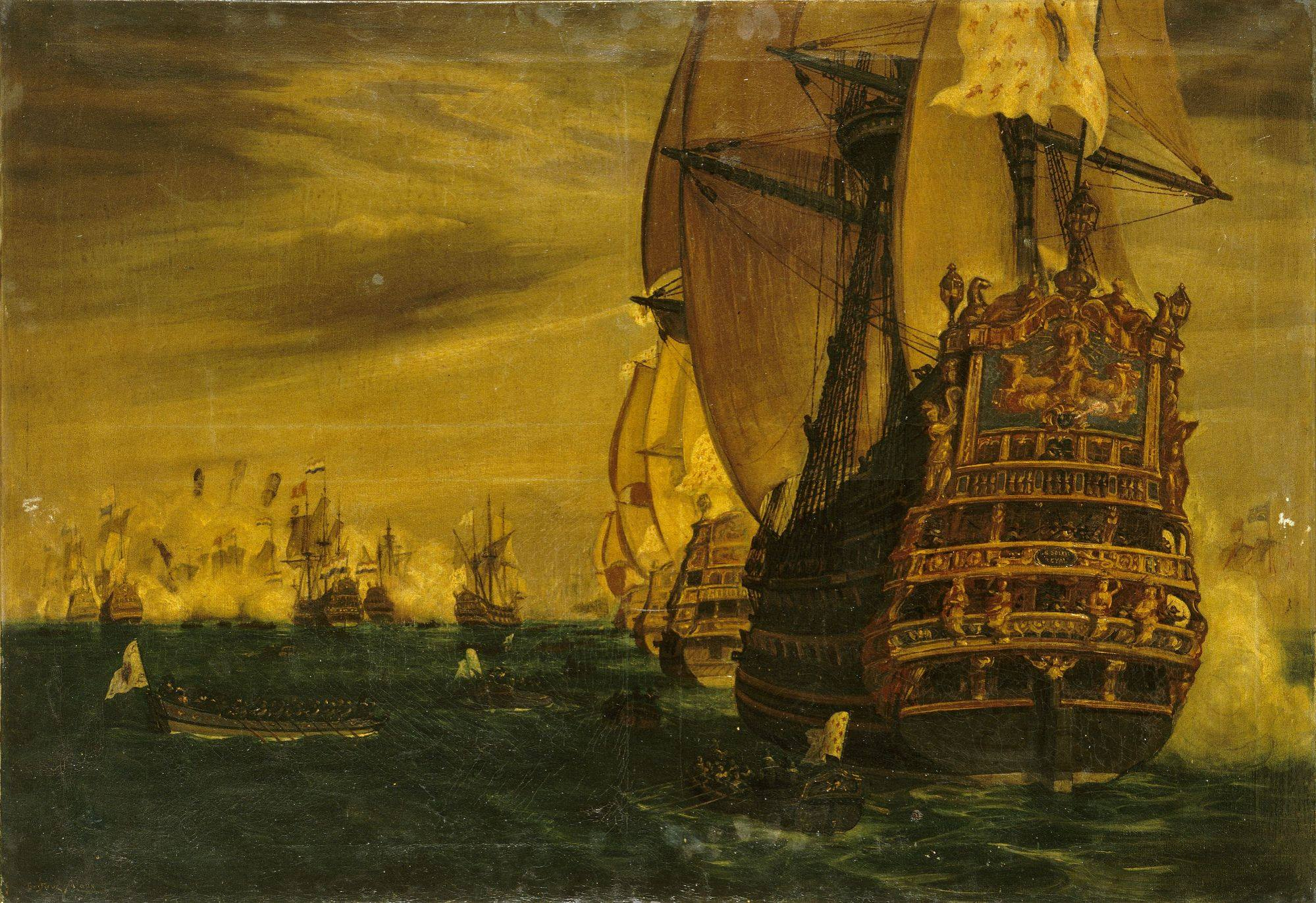
1928 painting of the Battle of Beachy Head

Year	Date	Event	Reference
1611	24 March	The first known reference to cricket being played by adults is recorded at Sidlesham on the Manhood peninsula.	
1611		First recorded use of the emblem of Sussex in John Speed's Theatrum Imperii Maganae Britanniae	
1624	10 September	Jasper Vinall becomes the first person recorded to have died as a result of an incident in a game of cricket	
1642	December	English Civil War: Battle of Muster Green in Haywards Heath results in the deaths or fleeing of 200 Royalists	
1642	22–27 December	English Civil War: Siege of Chichester	
1643	14 April - 1 May	English Civil War: Siege of Arundel Castle	
1643	13 December	English Civil War: Battle of Bramber Bridge	
1643-1644	19 December 1643 – 6 January 1644	English Civil War: Siege of Arundel	
1655		George Fox preaches at Ifield and as a result the first weekly Quaker meeting in Sussex is held; the first Quaker Friends meeting house in Sussex is built in 1676.	
1690	10 July	Battle of Beachy Head.	

== 18th century ==
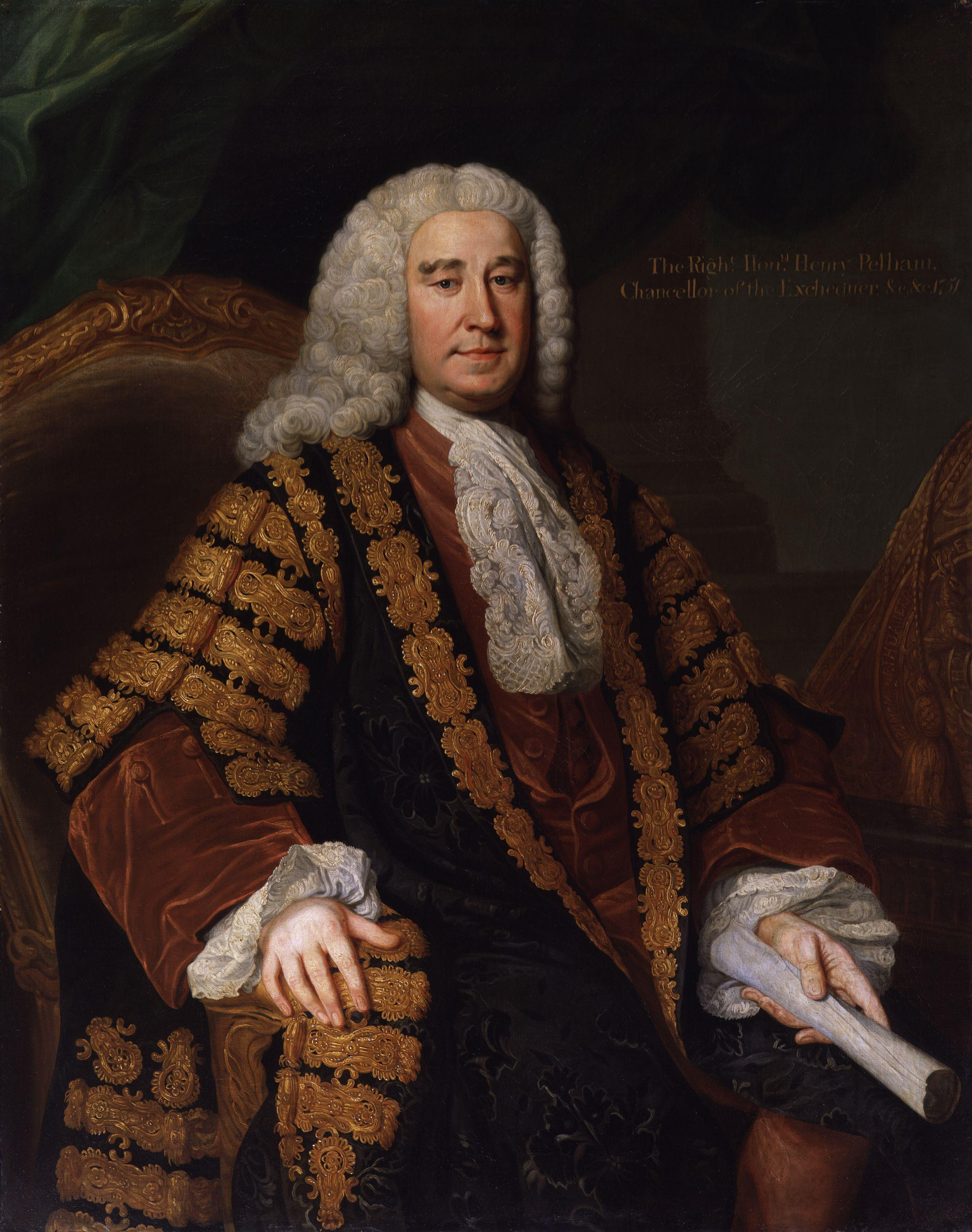
Henry Pelham, who became the British Prime Minister in 1743. Portrait of Henry Pelham by William Hoare, 1751

Year	Date	Event	Reference
1743	27 August	Henry Pelham, one of the two MPs elected to the county of Sussex constituency, becomes Prime Minister of Great Britain.	
1745		Sussex Weekly Advertiser first published.	
1748	February	The brutal murders take place of William Galley and Daniel Chater by the Hawkhurst Gang of smugglers.	
1749	16 January	At a special Assize in Chichester, seven men were convicted of smuggling and their part in murders carried out by the Hawkhurst Gang.	
1768	19 February	Thomas Paine moves to Lewes, where he develops his political ideas, particularly as part of the Headstrong Club.	
1794		Sussex Yeomanry founded when there was a threat of invasion in the Napoleonic Wars.	

== 19th century ==
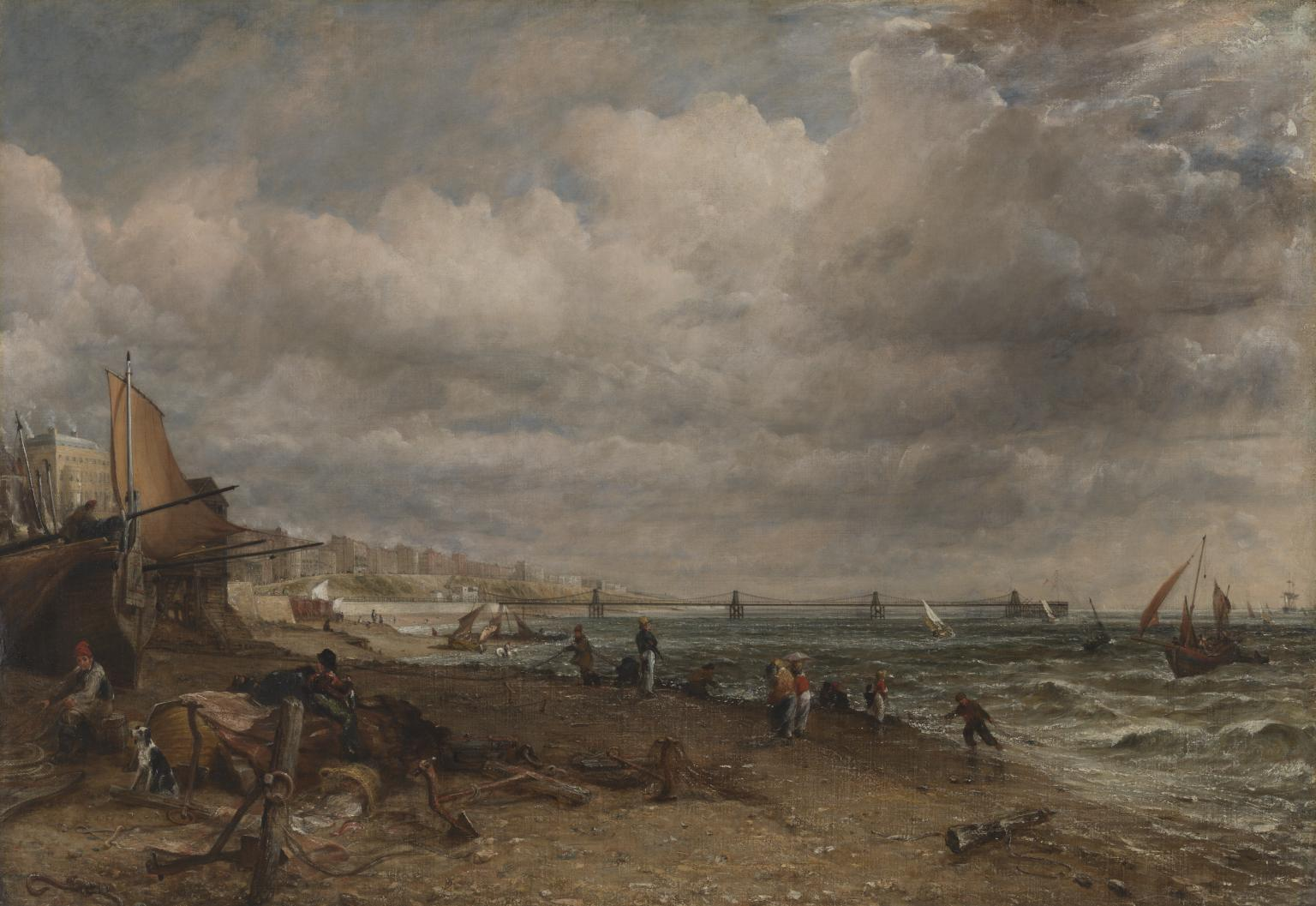
Brighton's Chain Pier, Sussex's earliest pier, was built in 1823. Painting Chain Pier, Brighton by John Constable, 1827

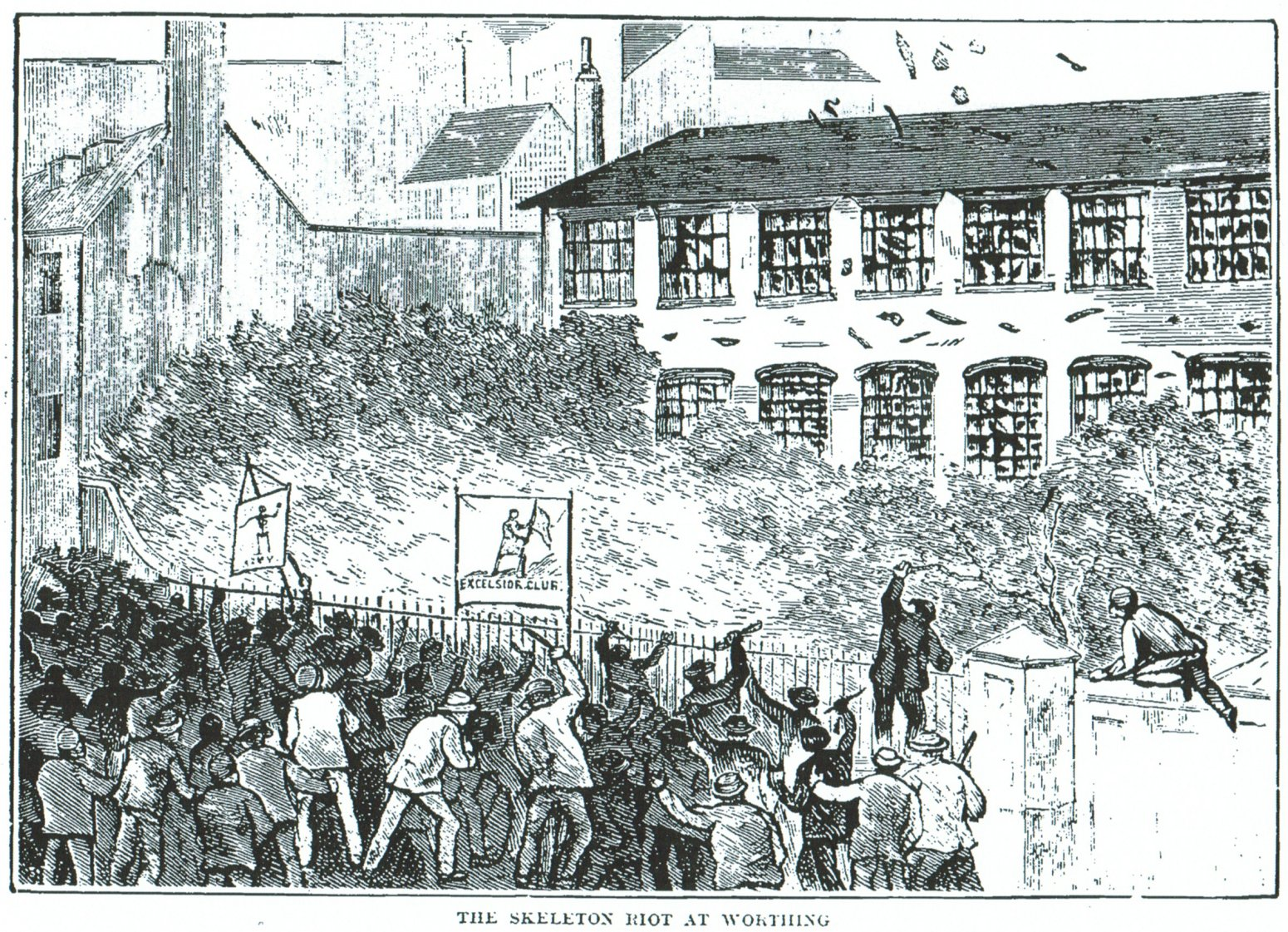
The Skeleton Army rioting in Worthing in 1884

Year	Date	Event	Reference
1801	27 November	Prince Augustus Frederick becomes Duke of Sussex	
1804	3 June	Birth of Richard Cobden, statesman and co-founder of the Anti-Corn Law League	
1804		Charles Lennox, 4th Duke of Richmond, gets royal permission for the title 'Sussex' to be transferred from the 25th Regiment of Foot to the 35th (Royal Sussex) Regiment of Foot. This regiment was replaced by the Royal Sussex Regiment 180 years later in 1881.	
1813		Ashburnham blast furnace is closed, the last in the Weald as iron production is produced more cheaply in the Midlands and the north of England using coke.	
1822		Gideon Mantell discovers dinosaur teeth in Tilgate Forest that he later names as a new genus of dinosaur found 'iguanadon', the second named genus of dinosaur.	
1823		Sussex's first pier, the Chain Pier, is built in Brighton.	
1828	11 June	Sussex County Hospital (now Royal Sussex County Hospital) opens in Brighton	
1830		Captain Swing riots take place across Sussex and England.	
1832		The Petworth Emigration Scheme is set up by the Earl of Egremont. Over the next five years around 1,800 working-class people from Sussex and neighbouring counties emigrate to Upper Canada to escape poverty.	
1835		John Sparshott is hanged in Horsham, becoming the second to last person in England to be put to death for homosexuality	
1836	27 December	Lewes avalanche kills 8 people.	
1837	27 March	Death of Maria Fitzherbert, longtime companion of the future King George IV of the United Kingdom at her home in Steine House, Brighton.	
1839	1 March	Sussex County Cricket Club formed, the first county cricket club.	
1840	11 May	The first railway line in Sussex, from Brighton to Shoreham opens.	
1853		Lewes Prison, the local prison for male prisoners in Sussex, is opened.	
1861	25 August	Clayton Tunnel rail crash results in 23 deaths.	
1864	25 July	Ebernoe Horn Fair is revived after a long lapse.	
1865		The County of Sussex Act 1865 confirms the sub-division of Sussex into east and west areas for purposes of administration.	
1884		Skeleton Army riots in Worthing	
1889		County Councils were established for Sussex's eastern and western divisions.	
1893		An outbreak of typhoid fever in Worthing results in 188 fatalities.	
1894		Administration of the south of Tunbridge Wells and south of Lamberhurst is transferred to Kent County Council	
1896		The National Trust acquires its first property, Alfriston Clergy House in Alfriston.	

== 20th century ==
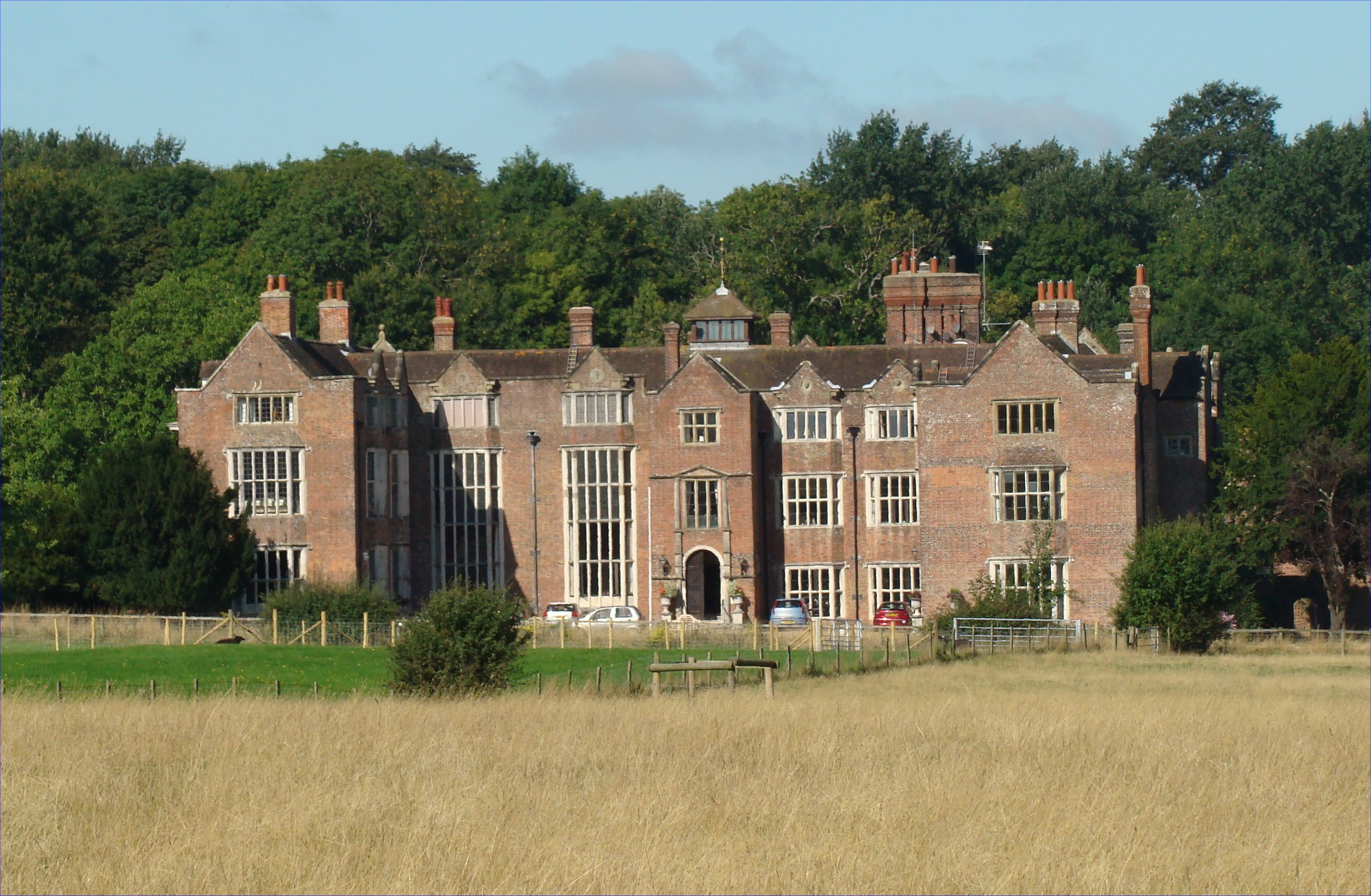
Danny House in Hurstpierpoint, where the terms of the armistice to be offered to Germany were agreed in 1918

Year	Date	Event	Reference
1907		"Sussex by the Sea", written by William Ward-Higgs from his South Bersted home, is published for the first time.	
1910		An airfield is established at Shoreham Airport making it one of the world's first airports.	
1916	24 March	Without warning a German submarine mistakenly torpedoes the SS Sussex, a cross-channel ferry, 13 miles (21 km) south of Dungeness resulting in 80 deaths.	
1916	30 June	Battle of the Boar's Head, known as "the Day Sussex Died"	
1918	13 October	At a meeting at Danny House in Hurstpierpoint, the Imperial War Cabinet agrees terms of the armistice to be offered to Germany at the end of World War I.	
1925		The Administration of Estates Act 1925 abolishes the custom of 'borough English' or ultimogentiture, a practice that prevailed more extensively in Sussex than elsewhere in England.	
1926	11 May	Angry confrontations known as Battle of Lewes Road take place in Brighton during the 1926 United Kingdom general strike.	
1934	9 October	Fascists and anti-Fascists clash at the Battle of South Street in Worthing.	
1940	September	Operation Sea Lion planned by Nazi Germany to land on the Sussex coast and part of the coast of Kent and invade the United Kingdom.	
1940		German air raids on Sussex begin, those in Brighton being known as the Brighton Blitz.	
1942		Dieppe Raid launched from Newhaven.	
1943		Deception plan Operation Fortitude launched to convince Nazis that invasion would come from First United States Army Group based in Sussex and Kent to invade the Pas-de-Calais department of northern France.	
1944		Ports of Shoreham and Newhaven used as embarkation points for the D-Day landings.	
1945	8 May	VE Day marks the end of the war in Europe.	
1945	15 August	VJ Day marks the end of World War II.	
1946	7 September	Teddy Donaldson establishes a new official airspeed world record of 615.78 mph (991.00 km/h; 535.10 kn) in a Gloster Meteor F.4 over Littlehampton.	
1946		New Towns Act 1946 designates Crawley as the site of a new town.	
1953	7 September	Neville Duke establishes a new official world air speed record of 727.63 mph (1,171.01 km/h), flying Hunter WB188.	
1961	August	Charter granted to the University of Sussex, the first university in Sussex.	
1962		Chichester Festival Theatre opens.	
1965	14 June	Bishop David Cashman is made the first bishop of the Roman Catholic diocese of Arundel and Brighton.	
1966		Sussex Downs Area of Outstanding Natural Beauty was designated; it was revoked in 2010 upon the establishment of the South Downs National Park.	
1967		The first Brighton Festival and Brighton Fringe are held	
1967		The first South of England Show is held at Ardingly.	
1967	4 November	Iberia Flight 062 crashes into the southern slope of Blackdown killing all 37 people on board	
1968		Sussex Police is formed.	
1970		A team at the Institute of Development Studies and the Science Policy Research Unit at the University of Sussex publishes the Sussex Manifesto at the request of the United Nations.	
1971		Chichester Harbour Area of Outstanding Natural Beauty is set up by an Act of Parliament.	
1972	July	The South Downs Way is established as Sussex's first National Trail and the UK's first long-distance bridleway.	
1972	October	Sussex Gay Liberation Front holds a demonstration in favour of gay rights, a precursor to the annual Brighton Pride event	
1974		As part of the Local Government Act 1972 the Lord Lieutenancy of Sussex replaced with one each for East and West Sussex which are made ceremonial counties.	
1980		Wilton Park is used as a venue for South African leaders including Jacob Zuma and the ruling National Party to meet behind closed doors.	
1982		At a meeting of the International Whaling Commission in Brighton, delegates vote for a moratorium on commercial whaling.	
1983	22 October	BBC Radio Brighton is relaunched as BBC Radio Sussex.	
1983	28 October	High Weald Area of Outstanding Natural Beauty is confirmed.	
1983		The Sussex Border Path is devised. The main path is 222 km (138 mi) long and stays close to Sussex's borders with Hampshire, Surrey and Kent, connecting Thorney Island to Rye.	
1984	12 October	Brighton bombing assassination attempt on Prime Minister Margaret Thatcher	

== 21st century ==
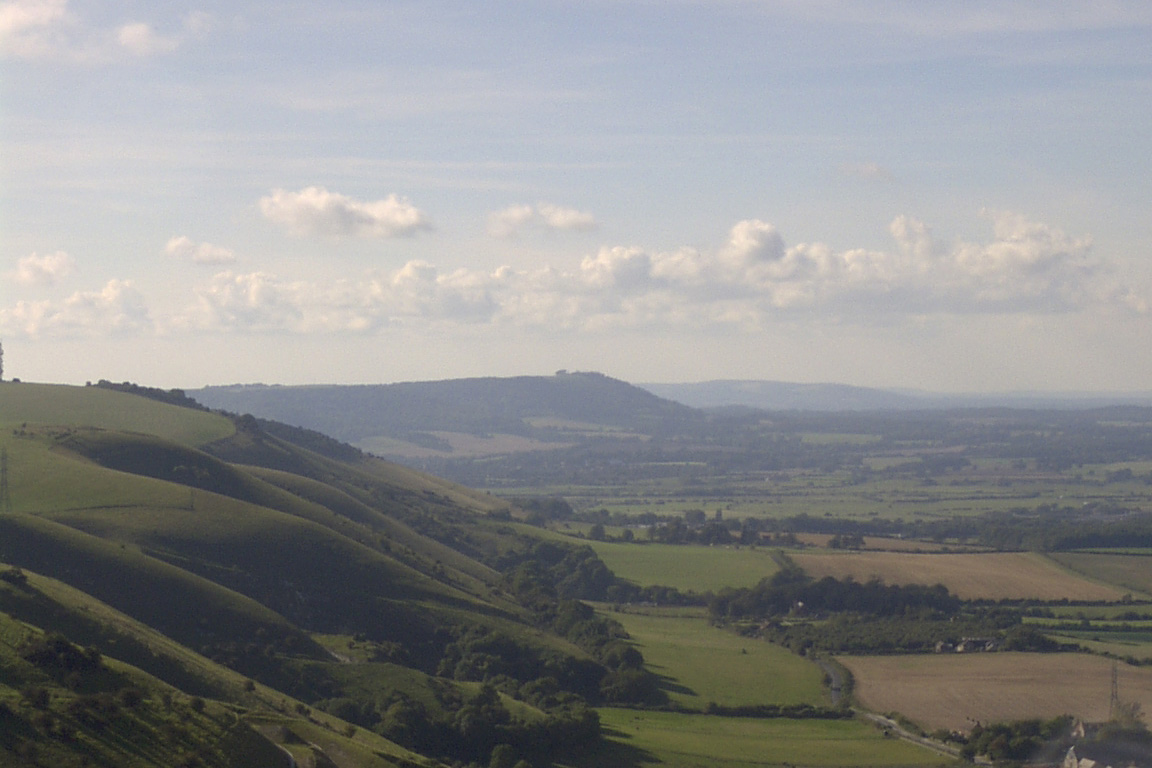
The South Downs was designated a national park on 1 April 2010

Year	Date	Event	Reference
2000		Brighton and Hove is granted city status, becoming Sussex's second city	
2000		Sir Charles Burrell, 10th Baronet begins the process of rewilding land at what went on to become Knepp Wildland, the first lowland rewilding project in England	
2002	7 October	Piers Sellers becomes the first native of Sussex to journey into outer space.	
2003		Thousands of Chagossians settle in Crawley following their earlier forced eviction by the UK Government from Diego Garcia in the Indian Ocean	
2005	5 December	The first civil partnership formed under the Civil Partnership Act 2004 takes place between Matthew Roche and Christopher Cramp at St Barnabas Hospice, Worthing	
2007	16 June	Sussex Day, Sussex's county day is celebrated for the first time.	
2009	14 March	Finance ministers and central bankers of the G20 meet at South Lodge Hotel in Lower Beeding in advance of the 2009 G20 London summit.	
2011	1 April	South Downs National Park becomes fully operational.	
2011	20 May	Flag of Sussex registered by Flag Institute.	
2012	21 November	Katy Bourne is elected as the first Sussex Police and Crime Commissioner	
2013	Summer	Protests against fracking take place in Balcombe	
2013	21 November	Beachy Head West, Kingmere and Pagham Harbour are made the first Marine Conservation Zones in Sussex waters.	
2014		UNESCO designates land between the Rivers Adur and Ouse to be the Brighton and Lewes Downs Biosphere Reserve, Sussex's first UNESCO Biosphere Reserve.	
2015	22 August	A Hawker Hunter T7 military aircraft participating in the Shoreham Airshow crashes onto the A27 dual carriageway outside of Shoreham Airport, killing 11 people and injuring 16 others.	
2015	15 December	Timothy Peake becomes the first British European Space Agency astronaut as well as the first person from Sussex to board the International Space Station.	
2016	May	The South Downs National Park is granted International Dark Sky Reserve status, to restrict artificial light pollution above the park; it is the second such area in England and the 11th in the world.	
2016	23 June	The people of Sussex vote to leave the EU by a margin of 50.23% to 49.77% or 4,413 votes in the referendum on UK membership of the EU.	
2018		The Rampion Wind Farm becomes operational, a wind farm that lies off the Sussex coast between Worthing and Seaford.	
2018	3 October	Prince Harry and Meghan Markle make their first official visit to Sussex as Duke and Duchess of Sussex	
2019	31 May	DEFRA designate "Selsey Bill and the Hounds" as a Marine Conservation Zone. The zone is an inshore site which covers an area of approximately 16 square kilometres (6.2 sq mi) and is located by the town of Selsey. The site adjoins the Bracklesham Bay Site of Special Scientific Interest.	
2020	6 February	The first case in Sussex of COVID-19 was reported when a man who returned from Singapore and France to the Brighton on 28 January	
2021	March	DEFRA announces a bylaw first proposed by the Sussex IFCA to prevent trawling on 304 square kilometres (117 sq mi) of sea bed off the coast of Sussex. The law should help the rewilding and regeneration of the Sussex kelp forest.	

== See also ==
- History of Sussex
- Kingdom of Sussex
- Sussex in the High Middle Ages
- History of Christianity in Sussex
- History of local government in Sussex

== Bibliography ==
- Armstrong, J.R. (1971). A History of Sussex. Sussex: Phillimore. ISBN 0-85033-185-4.
- Barbier, Mary (2007). D-day Deception: Operation Fortitude and the Normandy Invasion. Greenwood Publishing Group. ISBN 978-0275994792.
- Bartlett, Esquire Thomas (1841). The New Tablet of Memory; Or, Chronicle of Remarkable Events; with the Dates of Inventions and Discoveries in the Arts and Sciences; and Biographical Notices, Etc. Thomas Kelly.
- Begler, Elsie (2007). Thomas Paine: Common Sense for the Modern Era. Lulu.com. ISBN 978-1879691872.
- Bennett, David Malcolm (2003). The General: William Booth, Volume 2. Xulon Press. ISBN 978-1594672064.
- Brabant, Frederick Gaspard (1909). Rambles in Sussex. Sussex: Methuen.
- Brandon, Peter (2006). Sussex. London: Phillimore. ISBN 978-0-7090-6998-0.
- Bristow, Joseph, ed. (2003). Wilde Writings: Contextual Conditions. Toronto: University of Toronto Press. ISBN 978-0802035325.
- Campbell, Bruce M. S. (1992). Before the Black Death: Studies in the "crisis" of the Early Fourteenth Century. Manchester University Press. ISBN 9780719039270.
- Cannon, John (2009). A Dictionary of British History. Oxford: Oxford University Press. ISBN 978-0199550371.
- Cannon, John; Cannon, John Ashton; Hargreaves, Anne (2009). The Kings & Queens of Britain. Oxford: Oxford University Press. ISBN 978-0199559220.
- Challoner, Richard (1839). Memoirs of Missionary Priests: And Other Catholics of Both Sexes, that Have Suffered Death in England on Religious Accounts, from the Year 1577 to 1684, Volumes 1-2. John T. Green.
- Christopher, John, ed. (2014). Locomotives of London, Brighton and South Coast Railway. Amberley Publishing Limited. ISBN 978-1445634517.
- Cooper, Charles (2006). A Village in Sussex: The History of Kingston-Near-Lewes. I.B.Tauris. ISBN 978-1845111908.
- Creighton, Charles (2014). A History of Epidemics in Britain, Volume 1. Cambridge University Press. ISBN 978-1107621930.
- Daniell, Christopher (2013). From Norman Conquest to Magna Carta: England 1066–1215. Routledge. ISBN 978-1136356971.
- D'Enno, Douglas (2007). Brighton Crime and Vice, 1800-2000. London: Longman, Rees, Orme, Brown, Green & Longman.
- Drewry, Charles Stewart (1832). A Memoir of Suspension Bridges: Comprising The History Of Their Origin And Progress. Casemate Publishers. ISBN 978-1845630300.
- Elwes, Dudley George Cary; Robinson, Charles John (1876). A History of the Castles, Mansions, and Manors of Western Sussex. Longmans & Company.
- Fraser, Hamish; Brown, Callum G. (2014). Britain Since 1707. Routledge. ISBN 978-1317867500.
- Fritze, Ronald H.; Robison, William B. (2002). Historical Dictionary of Late Medieval England, 1272-1485. Greenwood Publishing Group. ISBN 9780313291241.
- Grehan, John; Mace, Martin (2012). Battleground Sussex: A Military History of Sussex from the Iron Age to the Present Day. Casemate Publishers. ISBN 978-1848846616.
- Hare, Chris (1991). Historic Worthing: The Untold Story. Cassell Reference. ISBN 9780900075919.
- Harper, Charles G. (2014). The Smugglers: Picturesque Chapters in the Story of an Ancient Craft. Indo-European Publishing.
- Hernon, Ian (2013). Fortress Britain: All the Invasions and Incursions Since 1066. The History Press. ISBN 978-0752497174.
- Herrup, Cynthia B. (1989). The Common Peace: Participation and the Criminal Law in Seventeenth-Century England. Cambridge University Press. ISBN 978-0521375870.
- Higham, Nicholas; Ryan, M.J. (2013). The Anglo Saxon World. Yale University Press. ISBN 978-0300125344.
- Jones, Kaye (2010). 1066 In An Hour. History In An Hour. ISBN 978-1452392318.
- Jordan, William Chester (1997). The Great Famine: Northern Europe in the Early Fourteenth Century. Princeton University Press. ISBN 978-1400822133.
- Keynes, Simon (2013). The Wiley Blackwell Encyclopedia of Anglo-Saxon England Appendix I (PDF). Wiley Blackwell. pp. 521Fbos–538. doi:10.1002/9781118316061.app1. ISBN 9781118316061.
- Kirby, D.P. (2000). The Earliest English Kings. Routledge. ISBN 9780415242110.
- Lapidge, Michael; Blair, John; Keynes, Simon; Scragg, Donald (2013). The Wiley Blackwell Encyclopedia of Anglo-Saxon England. Chichester: John Wiley & Sons. ISBN 978-1118316108.
- Lehmberg, Stanford E. (2014). The Reformation of Cathedrals: Cathedrals in English Society. Princeton University Press. ISBN 978-1400859801.
- Leslie, Kim; Short, Brian (1999). An Historical Atlas of Sussex. Phillimore. ISBN 978-1860771125.
- Locke, Tim (2011). Bradt Slow Sussex & South Downs National Park: Local, Characterful Guides to Britain's Special Places. Bradt Travel Guides. ISBN 978-1841623436.
- Logan, F. Donald (2013). The Vikings in History. Routledge. ISBN 978-1136527098.
- Longmate, Norman (2011). Defending The Island: From Caesar to the Armada. Random House. ISBN 978-1446475751.
- Lowerson, John (1980). A Short History of Sussex. Folkestone: Dawson Publishing. ISBN 0-7129-0948-6.
- Manton, Colin (2013). Haywards Heath Through Time. Amberley: Amberley Publishing Limited. ISBN 978-1445628677.
- Mason, Emma; Brink Shoemaker, Robert (2004). The House of Godwine: The History of a Dynasty. A & C Black. ISBN 978-1852853891.
- McCann, Tim (2004). Sussex Cricket in the Eighteenth Century. Sussex Record Society.
- Melton, J. Gordon (2014). Faiths Across Time: 5,000 Years of Religious History. ABC-CLIO. ISBN 978-1610690263.
- Messamore, Barbara Jane (2004). Canadian Migration Patterns from Britain and North America. University of Ottawa Press. ISBN 978-0776605432.
- Murland, Jenny; Murland, Jerry (2008). Departed Warriors: The Story of a Family in War. Troubador Publishing Ltd. ISBN 978-1906510701.
- Naylor, Murray (2013). England's Cathedrals by Train: Discover how the Normans and Victorians Helped to Shape our Lives. Remember When. ISBN 978-1473826960.
- Olusoga, David (2016). Black and British: A Forgotten History. Pan Macmillan. ISBN 9781447299745.
- Payton, Philip (2017). A History of Sussex. Carnegie Publishing. ISBN 978-1-85936-232-7.
- Points, Guy (2013). The Combined Anglo-Saxon Chronicles. Guy Points. ISBN 978-0955767968.
- Potter, Philip J. (2012). Monarchs of the Renaissance: The Lives and Reigns of 42 European Kings and Queens. McFarland. ISBN 978-0786491032.
- Quinn, Tom (2007). Britain's Best Walks. New Holland Publishers. ISBN 978-1845377847.
- Ravenscroft, Neil (1992), Recreation Planning and Development, Macmillan International Higher Education, p. 145, ISBN 9781349221974.
- Roach, Levi (2013). Kingship and Consent in Anglo-Saxon England, 871-978: Assemblies and the State in the Early Middle Ages. Cambridge University Press. ISBN 978-1107036536.
- Scott, Les (2011). Bats, Balls & Bails: The Essential Cricket Book. Random House. ISBN 978-1446423165.
- Seward, Desmond (1996). Sussex. Pomegranate Press. ISBN 978-0712651332.
- Spence, Keith (1999). The Companion Guide to Kent and Sussex. Boydell & Brewer Ltd. ISBN 978-1900639262.
- Stanton, Charles D. (2015). Medieval Maritime Warfare. Pen and Sword. ISBN 978-1781592519.
- Symonds, Craig L. (2014). Neptune: The Allied Invasion of Europe and the D-Day Landings. Oxford University Press. ISBN 978-0199986125.
- Venn, John (2011). Alumni Cantabrigienses: A Biographical List of All Known Students, Graduates and Holders of Office at the University of Cambridge, from the Earliest Times to 1900. Cambridge University Press. ISBN 978-1108036078.
- Wacher, John, ed. (2020). Towns of Roman Britain. Routledge. ISBN 9781000117318.
- Wagner, John A. (2006). Encyclopedia of the Hundred Years War. Greenwood Publishing Group. ISBN 978-0313327360.
