= Byelaws in the United Kingdom =

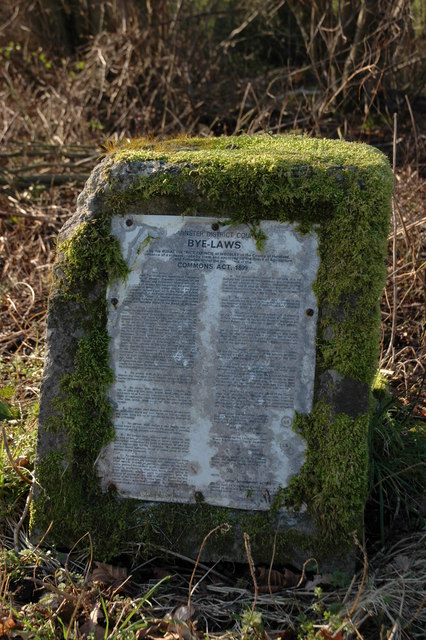
Commons Bye-Laws, Hopley's Green Commons Act 1899 information plaque on common land at Hopley's Green.

In the United Kingdom, byelaws are laws of local or limited application made by local councils or other bodies, in specific areas using powers granted by the relevant Acts of Parliament, and so are a form of delegated legislation. Some byelaws are also made by private companies or charities that exercise public or semi-public functions, such as airport operators, water companies or the National Trust.

Formerly, because byelaws created criminal offences that can be prosecuted in magistrates' courts or Justice of the Peace Courts in Scotland, they had to be approved by central government before they came into force. However, due to the Local Government Byelaws (Wales) Act 2012 and the Byelaws (Alternative Procedure) (England) Regulations 2016 (SI 2016/165), there is a simplified procedure for making new byelaws and amending byelaws, including replacing the Secretary of State for Housing, Communities and Local Government's role in confirming byelaws. This is now a matter for the local council concerned, having taken account of any representations made about a proposed byelaw. The regulations also give councils powers to revoke byelaws under an entirely local process.

Local council byelaws are generally restricted in scope to activities in a particular place, for example a public park, or a particular class of activities, such as amusement arcades. Byelaws are not made for an activity where there is already legislation. Byelaws made by public transport companies are limited to the transport facilities operated by the organisation making the byelaw. Because they only apply to limited areas or facilities, byelaws are generally not made by statutory instrument.

== Making of local government byelaws ==
In 2006, the then Office of the Deputy Prime Minister consulted on changes to how some byelaws are made and approved (confirmed) by central government, and how they are enforced. As a result, the Local Government and Public Involvement in Health Act 2007 included provision for the government to implement alternative arrangements for making byelaws, and for their enforcement through the issue of fixed penalty notices.

A further consultation took place in 2008 concerning the specific byelaws to be affected by the changes, and the new procedures for making byelaws and issuing Penalty Notices.

The 2008 consultation document stated that some byelaws would continue to need to be confirmed by the government. These include those byelaws made by private companies (so as to ensure that there is democratic accountability), and those likely to be controversial, for example concerning fisheries.

The power to issue fixed penalties would be granted to police community support officers and also to suitably trained officers appointed by local councils, including parish councils and community councils.

Following the introduction of the Local Government Byelaws (Wales) Act 2012, and the Byelaws (Alternative Procedure) (England) Regulations 2016, there is a simplified procedure for making new byelaws and amending local government byelaws covered by the Ministry for Housing, Communities and Local Government (MHCLG), including replacing the Secretary of State for Housing, Communities and Local Government's role in confirming byelaws. This is now a matter for the local council, having taken account of any representations made about the proposed byelaw. The new arrangements transfer the accountability for making byelaws to local councils. Local councils should ensure that a proposed byelaw is proportionate and necessary before making any new byelaw.

Under the new decentralised arrangements, MHCLG will assume information supplied by the local authority in its application for leave to make a byelaw is correct. The Secretary of State will consider the draft byelaws, report and deregulatory statement provided by the local authority and will, within 30 days, either give leave to make the byelaw, or not give leave to make the byelaw. The Secretary of State may also choose to defer his decision to allow time for further consideration. The new arrangements allows the local authority to make only minor modifications to the proposed byelaws after leave has been given to make the byelaws. Councils should therefore ensure care is taken when drafting byelaws. The regulations also give councils powers to revoke byelaws under an entirely local process.

== Enforcement of byelaws ==
Breaches of byelaws are prosecuted in a magistrates' court or justice of the peace courts in Scotland. The punishment is a fine, the maximum being generally between £500 and £2,500.

== Local council byelaws ==
Local councils have powers to make byelaws under various acts of Parliament. The power to make byelaws "for the good rule and government" of their area, granted by the Local Government Act 1972, appears to be very sweeping, however this power is greatly limited by the restriction that it cannot be used in connection with anything already covered under other legislation.

Other acts grant powers to make byelaws relating to various aspects of public recreation, the management of markets, ensuring hygiene in certain types of business and behaviour in public libraries.

Following the election of the Conservative–Liberal Democrat Coalition Government in 2010, it has been suggested that councils may be permitted to use byelaws to improve public health, by imposing local minimum prices for alcohol, limiting promotions associated with fast food or making films depicting smoking automatically 18 rated. In Wales, local council byelaws do not need to be confirmed by central government since the Local Government Byelaws (Wales) Act 2012.

Act granting power to make byelaws	General description of power	Typical matters covered by the byelaws
Section 235, Local Government Act 1972	Good rule and government, and the prevention of nuisances	Climbing on bridges, skateboarding, riding on verges, playing games on or near highways, fairground attractions causing obstructions, touting, urinating or defecating in public, interfering with life-saving equipment or road signs.
Section 164, Public Health Act 1875	Regulation of public walks and pleasure grounds	Climbing, grazing of animals, camping, fires, throwing of missiles, interference with life-saving equipment, horse-riding, cycling, vehicles, play areas, skateboarding, ball-games and other sports, bathing, ice-skating, fishing, model boats, aircraft and hot air balloons, kites, model aircraft, public performances, excessive noise, metal detectors, offering items for sale and protection of plants.
Sections 12 and 15, Open Spaces Act 1906	Regulation of open spaces and burial grounds	(Same list as for section 164 of the Public Health Act 1875)
Section 82, Public Health Acts Amendment Act 1907	Regulating use of the seashore	Fishing, bait digging, horse-riding, games, public performances, fires, parties, aircraft, kites, unauthorised structures, offering items for sale and interference with life-saving equipment, signs or flags
Section 83, Public Health Acts Amendment Act 1907	Regulating use of promenades	Cycling, vehicles, skate-boarding, kites, unauthorised structures, offering items for sale and interference with life-saving equipment, signs or flags.
Section 231, Public Health Act 1936	Regulating public bathing	Times and places, use of huts and tents, bathing costumes, life-saving appliances, and use of pleasure boats within areas allotted for public bathing.
Section 76, Public Health Act 1961	Regulating seaside pleasure boats	Personal watercraft (including jet-skis) and waterskiing including speed, navigation and noise
Section 185, Local Government, Planning and Land Act 1980	Regulating hired pleasure boats	Numbering and naming, and qualifications and behaviour of boatmen in charge
Section 223, Public Health Act 1936	Regulating public swimming pools	
Section 6, Food Act 1984	Regulating markets	Opening hours, allocation of pitches, maintaining cleanliness, preventing obstruction, use of water taps, prevention of fires, and ensuring adequate space for penned animals.
Section 75, Public Health Act 1961, as amended by section 22, Local Government (Miscellaneous Provisions) Act 1976	Regulating amusement premises and pleasure fairs	Opening hours, restricting noise, fire safety and prevention, adequate supervision and excluding drunks and prostitutes.
Section 77. Public Health Act 1961, as amended by section 22, Local Government (Miscellaneous Provisions) Act 1976	Regulating hairdressers and barbers	Cleanliness of premises, tools and personnel.
Section 198, Public Health Act 1936	Regulating public mortuaries and post-mortem rooms	Management and charges for use
Section 19, Public Libraries and Museums Act 1964	Regulating use of libraries	Cleanliness of library users, dogs, disorderly behaviour, sleeping, noise, supervision of children, offering items for sale, eating and drinking, mobile phones, radios.
Part VIII, Local Government (Miscellaneous Provisions) Act 1982 as amended by Local Government Act 2003. and London Local Authorities Act 1991 and the Greater London Council (General Powers) Act 1981	Hygiene and cleanliness of acupuncture services and businesses providing tattooing, semi-permanent skin-colouring, cosmetic piercing and electrolysis	Cleanliness of premises, equipment and operators.
Sections 18 and 20, Children and Young Persons Act 1933	Restrictions on employment of children	Ages at which children may be employed, the types of work they may do, hours of work, and street trading.

== Countryside byelaws ==
Byelaws concerning the behaviour of the public in the countryside are limited to defined areas, and might be made by a local council, a national park authority, or other bodies established by statute specifically to look after a particular area.

Act granting power to make byelaws	Byelaw-making body	General description of power	Typical matters covered by the byelaws
Sections 20, 21(4) and 106 of the National Parks and Access to the Countryside Act 1949	Local councils and English Nature / Scottish Natural Heritage / Countryside Council for Wales	Local nature reserves	Restriction of access; catching, disturbing, injuring or killing animals or eggs, pupae or larvae; damaging plants; introducing any animals, eggs, plants or seeds that may reproduce, hatch, propagate or germinate; grazing; pollution of water; bathing, water-skiing, ice-skating, sailing boats or model boats; obstructing watercourses; vehicles and aircraft; electronic equipment, firearms, kites, model aircraft; fires; camping; shutting of gates.
Sections 20, National Parks and Access to the Countryside Act 1949, and section 28R, Wildlife and Countryside Act 1981	English Nature / Scottish Natural Heritage / Countryside Council for Wales	Sites of Special Scientific Interest	
Section 17, Countryside and Rights of Way Act 2000	National park authority or local council	Access land	Preservation of order, prevention of damage to the land and avoiding interference with the enjoyment of the land by others (generally the same list as for section 164 of the Public Health Act 1875)
Sections 90 and 91, National Parks and Access to the Countryside Act 1949	Local councils	National Parks and Areas of Outstanding Natural Beauty	
Section 129 to 133, Marine and Coastal Access Act 2009	Marine Management Organisation	Inshore waters (specifically marine conservation zones)	Protecting marine conservation zones
Green Belt (London and Home Counties) Act 1938		Countryside	
Section 41, Countryside Act 1968	Local councils	Country Parks and Picnic Sites	Preservation of order, prevention of damage to the land, avoiding interference with the enjoyment of the land by others, regulating sailing on waterways and make charges for the registration of boats (plus generally the same list as for section 164 of the Public Health Act 1875)
Section 28, Lee Valley Regional Park Act 1966	Lee Valley Regional Park Authority		Preservation of order, prevention of damage to the land, regulating use of the land and navigation on waterways, control of dogs, and preventing the outbreak or spread of fire within the Lee Valley Park
London (Various Powers) Act 1990			
Section 46, Forestry Act 1967	Forestry Commission	Forestry Commission lands and plantations	Preservation of trees and timber, protection of the land and regulating the reasonable use of the land by the public
Section 25, New Forest Act 1877 and section 9, New Forest Act 1949	Verderers of the New Forest	The New Forest	
Section 36, Epping Forest Act 1878	Common Council of the City of London as the Epping Forest Conservators	Epping Forest	
Section 19, Ashdown Forest Act 1974	Ashdown Forest Conservators	Ashdown Forest	
Section 84, Wimbledon and Putney Common Act 1871	Wimbledon and Putney Commons Conservators	Wimbledon and Putney Commons	
Section 6, Metropolitan Commons Act 1866	Local councils	Commons and town and village greens	
Section 15, Commons Act 1876	The majority in value of owners of rights of pasture	Common land	Prevention of or protection from nuisances or for keeping order on the regulated pasture, and for general management, occupation, and enjoyment of the regulated pasture
Section 10, Commons Act 1899 (as substituted by Commons Act 2006)	Local councils	Common land	Prevention of nuisances and the preservation of order on a Common, including protection of plants and animals, fires, control of dogs, grazing of animals, erection of structures, offering items for sale, use of firearms and throwing of missiles, vehicles, aircraft, horse-riding, bathing, and obstructing or annoying others.
Section 11, Dartmoor Commons Act 1985	Devon County Council as Dartmoor National Park Authority	Dartmoor National Park	
Section 25, River Cam Conservancy Act 1922	River Cam Conservators	River Cam	Licensing of vessels, all aspects of navigation, races and regattas, mooring, use of locks, prevention of nuisances, bathing, etc.
Malvern Hills Acts 1884 to 1995	Malvern Hills Conservators	Malvern Hills	
Sections 12 and 13, Countryside Act 1968	Local councils	Facilities provided for the enjoyment of the sea or waterways adjoining a National Park	
Section 10(3) and Section 10(5) and paragraph 4 of Schedule 5, Norfolk and Suffolk Broads Act 1988	The Broads Authority	The Norfolk and Suffolk Broads National Park	All aspects of navigation including speed; also water-skiing
Section 157, Water Industry Act 1991	Water companies	Reservoirs and Water Parks	
Schedule 25, Water Resources Act 1991 and section 66, Land Drainage Act 1991	Environment Agency, local councils and internal drainage boards	Internal drainage	Control of sluices, diversion or stopping up of watercourses, introduction of water to courses, fishing, fires, vegetation, vermin, protection of banks, dredging, navigation of vessels.
Section 5 of the Sea Fisheries Regulation Act 1966	Sea Fisheries Committees	Sea Fisheries	Restricting or prohibiting fishing for all or any specified kinds of sea fish during any period, methods of fishing, equipment used (including size of mesh), and regulating shellfish and oyster cultivation. Note: This provision is to be repealed on the coming into force of the relevant sections of the Marine and Coastal Access Act 2009
Sections 155-162 of the Marine and Coastal Access Act 2009	Inshore fisheries and conservation authorities	Sea Fisheries	Prohibiting or restricting exploitation of sea fisheries resources, protection of fisheries for shellfish, monitoring of exploitation of resources, regulating fisheries through the issue of permits, prohibiting or restricting specific vessels, methods orgear
Schedule 25, Water Resources Act 1991	Environment Agency	Inland waterways	Preservation of order, prevention of damage to the waterway or land, avoiding interference with the enjoyment of the waterway or land by others; boating; pollution; flood defence and drainage; salmon, trout, freshwater and eel fisheries; conservation of the natural beauty or amenity of marine or coastal, or aquatic or waterside, areas, or of any features of archaeological or historic interest, and the conservation of flora or fauna that depend on, or associated with, a marine or coastal, or aquatic or waterside, environment.
National Trust Acts 1907 to 2005	National Trust and National Trust for Scotland	National Trust land	

== Transport byelaws ==
A variety of Acts grant powers to make byelaws regulating conduct on public transport. The power to make byelaws is usually granted to the public transport operator, which is sometimes a private company.

Act granting power to make byelaws	Byelaw-making body	General description of power	Typical matters covered by the byelaws
Section 35, Highways Act 1980	Local council (highways authority)	Walkways	Conduct of the public, closing times, placement of structures.
Section 68, Town Police Clauses Act 1847	Local councils	Taxis (hackney carriages)	Conduct of drivers and proprietors, and fares
Section 6, Town Police Clauses Act 1889	Local councils	Horse drawn omnibuses	
Section 46, Railways Act 2005	Railway operators	Railway network in Great Britain	Use of, and travel, maintenance of order and conduct of persons on, the rail network
Paragraph 26 of Schedule 11, Greater London Authority Act 1999	Transport for London	Transport for London's railways and railway premises	Regulating the use, and working of, and travel and behaviour of passengers
Paragraph 27 of Schedule 11, Greater London Authority Act 1999	Transport for London	Regulating the use of any landing place vested in or operated by Transport for London.	
Section 25, London Transport Act 1969	Transport for London	Transport for London's road transport garages, depots, bus stations, shelters, other premises and approaches.	Regulating the use and working of, and behaviour of passengers
Section 46, Croydon Tramlink Act 1994		Tramlink premises and facilities.	Regulating the use and working of, and travel and behaviour of passengers
Section 59, Leeds Supertram Act 1993		Leeds Supertram	Regulating behaviour on various local light railways and tramways.
Section 62, Greater Nottingham Light Rapid Transit Act 1994		Nottingham Express Transit	Regulating behaviour on various local light railways and tramways.
section 67, Transport Act 1962 as amended by section 37, Transport Act 1981 and paragraph 2 of Schedule 4 to London Regional Transport Act 1984			
Local Acts and Transport and Works Act Orders		Other guided transport systems e.g. tramways and light rapid transit systems	
London County Council (Tunnel and Improvements) Act 1938		Blackwall Tunnels and their approaches.	
Section 54, Thames Tunnel (Rotherhithe and Ratcliff) Act 1900		Rotherhithe Tunnel	
Section 102, County of Merseyside Act 1980 as amended by the Mersey Tunnels Order 1986	Merseyside Passenger Transport Authority	Mersey Tunnels	
Section 23, Metropolitan Board of Works (Various Powers) Act 1885	Transport for London	Woolwich Ferry	Regulating the use and working of, and behaviour on, the Ferry
Section 18, Harbours, Docks and Piers Clauses Act 1847, and Harbour Revision Orders and local acts and orders	Harbour authorities, which can be local councils or private companies	Ports and harbours	Navigation, mooring, handling of goods, road and rail traffic, interference with life-saving equipment, water sports, bathing and diving, fishing, skateboarding
Sections 63 and schedule 3, Airports Act 1986	Airport operators, who can be public bodies or private companies	Airports	Safety of aircraft, vehicles and people, controlling operation of aircraft, controlling vehicles not on public roads including regulating speed and parking, regulating taxis, restricting access to parts of the airport, preserving order, and safe custody of lost property.
British Transport Commission Act 1954, British Waterways Acts 1971 and 1975	British Waterways	Canals	Licensing of vessels, all aspects of navigation, mooring, use of locks, prevention of nuisances, bathing, etc.

== Military lands byelaws ==
The Secretary of State for Defence has powers under section 14 of the Military Lands Act 1892 (55 & 56 Vict. c. 43) to make byelaws regulating access to Ministry of Defence lands, including their use by the public for recreation. Since 2004, the Ministry of Defence is reviewing all of its byelaws. Unlike most other byelaws, military lands byelaws are made by statutory instrument.
