= Urban open space =

Open area of a town or city

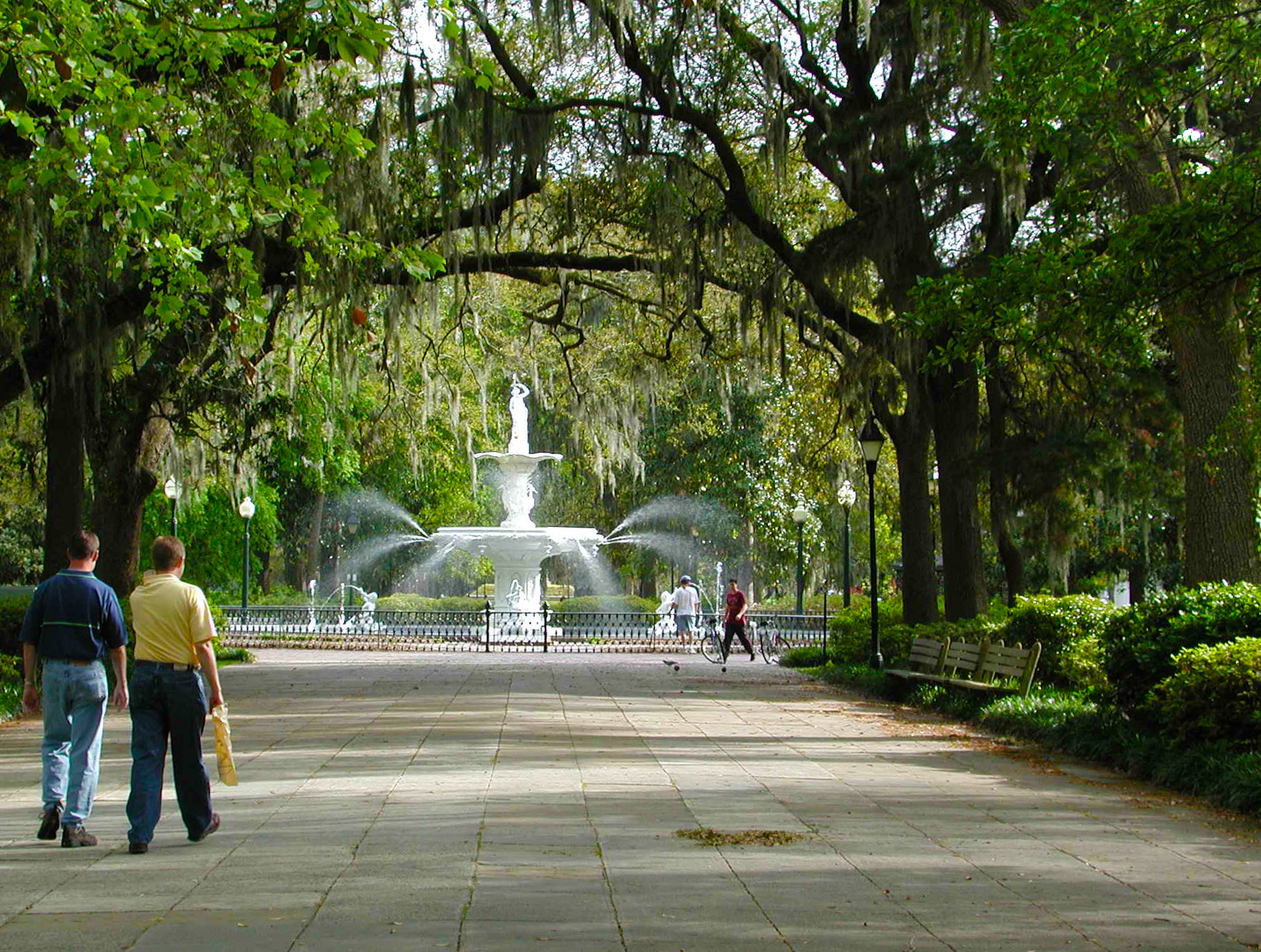
Forsyth Park is a large urban open space located in the center of Savannah, Georgia

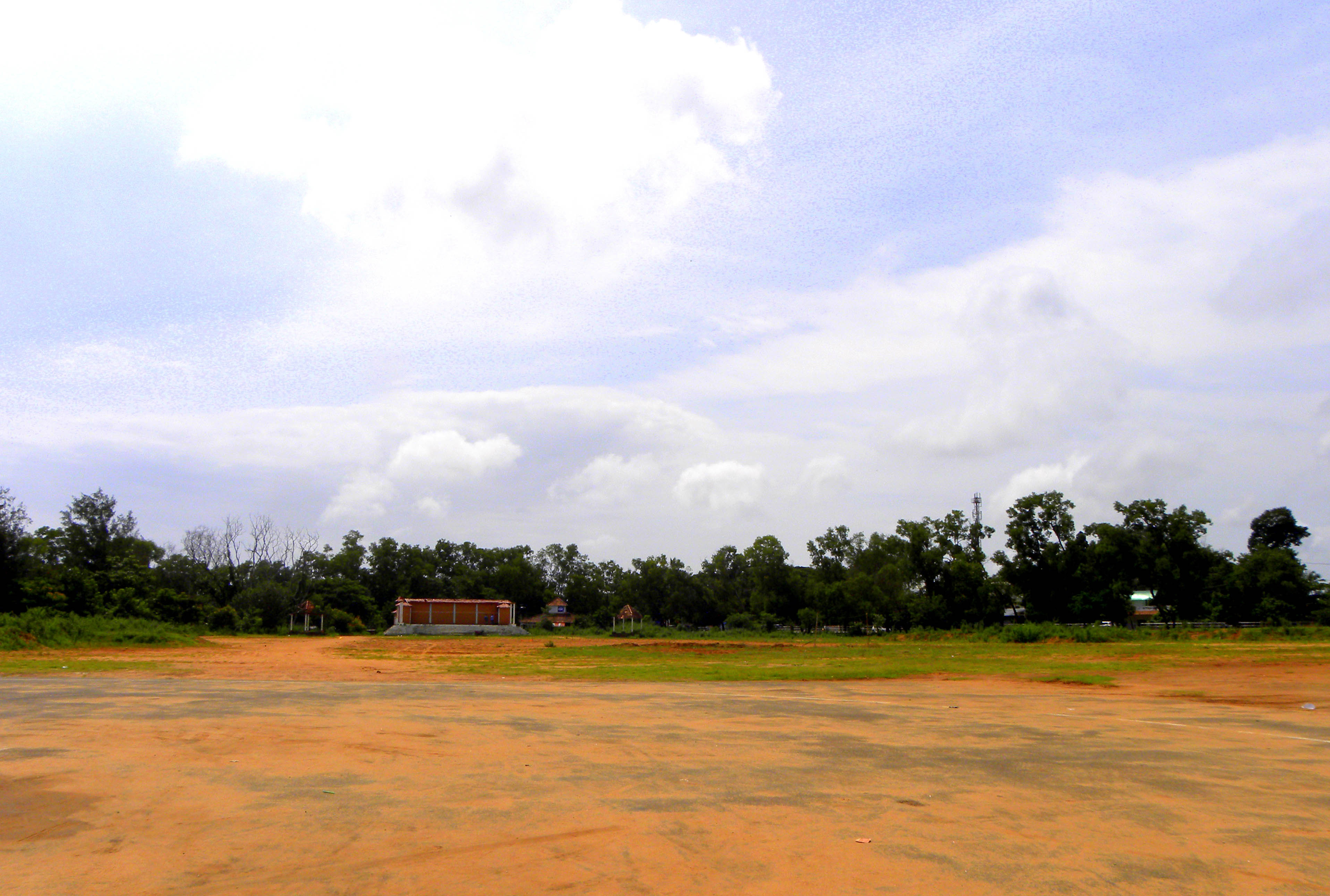
Asramam Maidan in Kozhikode, India, is the largest open space among all cities in Kerala.

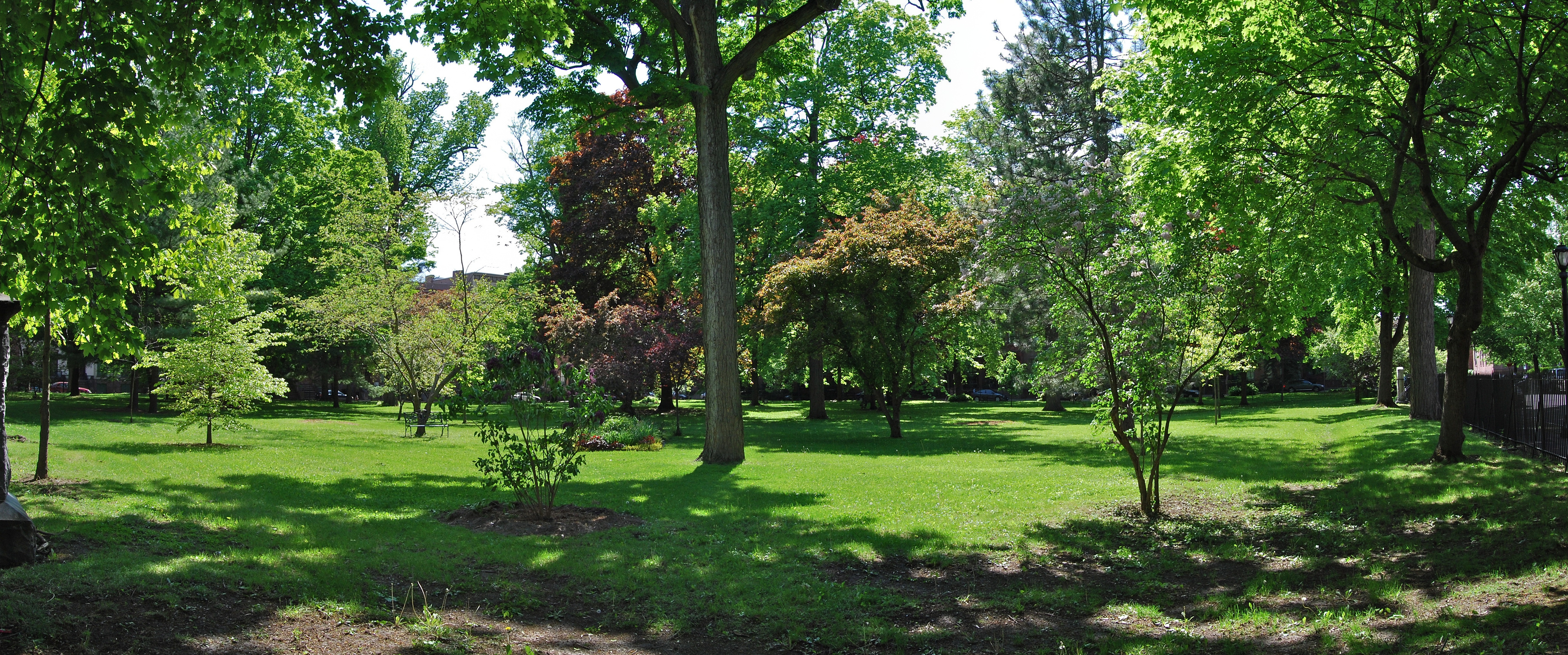
Washington Park in Troy, New York, United States

In urban planning, urban open space (also known as urban space or open space) is a space left within a building site that can connect to roads and provide public access. Openness means that it must be open to the public. It'is outdoor, not indoor; and includes vegetation. The definition of open space is inclusive; garden, market, and town squares, urban parks, greenways, and highways are all open spaces.

In order to encourage private business and land developers to actively create open spaces, some governments have implemented "incentive open space" measures. This type of public space is known as privately-owned public space (POPS); it can be contrasted with public open space.

== Definition ==
The term urban open space encompasses many types of open areas. One definition holds that "as the counterpart of development, urban open space is a natural and cultural resource that is neither 'unused land' nor synonymous with 'parks and recreational areas'." Another definition is that "open space is land and/or water that is open to the sky on the surface, intentionally acquired or publicly regulated to provide opportunities for entertainment, conservation, and urban shaping functions".

Public spaces are generally defined as gathering places outside of homes and typical workplaces, allowing the public to enter, promoting interaction among residents and providing opportunities for connection and proximity. This definition includes community interaction, with a focus on participation rather than ownership or management.

The modern concept of "open space" was first defined by the Metropolitan Open Spaces Act 1877 in the United Kingdom, and it was the earliest legal regulation related to open spaces. The 1906 version of the law defines open space as:

The term 'open space' refers to any land on which there are no buildings or the building coverage rate is not more than one twentieth, whether enclosed or not, the whole or the rest of which is used for landscaping or entertainment purposes, or abandoned and unoccupied.

== Benefit ==
The benefits provided by urban open spaces fall in three categories: recreational, ecological, and aesthetic values. The psychological benefits brought by urban open spaces to visitors increase with the increase of biodiversity, indicating that "green" alone is not enough, and the quality of green spaces is equally important.
