= Food Act 1984 =

Act of the Parliament of the United Kingdom

Food Act 1984 (Note: Section 136(1).)
- Act of Parliament
- Parliament of the United Kingdom
- Long title: An Act to consolidate the provisions of the Food and Drugs Acts 1955 to 1982, the Sugar Act 1956, the Food and Drugs (Milk) Act 1970, section 7(3) and (4) of the European Communities Act 1972, section 198 of the Local Government Act 1972 and Part IX of the Local Government (Miscellaneous Provisions) Act 1982, and connected provisions.
- Citation: 1984 c. 30
- Territorial extent: England and Wales; Scotland; Northern Ireland; (Note: Section 136(2)–(3))

Dates
- Royal assent: 26 June 1984
- Commencement: 26 September 1984 (Note: Section 136(4).)
- Repealed: Scotland: 16 June 2025
Other legislation
Amends	See § Repealed enactments
Repeals/revokes	See § Repealed enactments
Amended by	Weights and Measures Act 1985; Consumer Protection Act 1987; Statute Law (Repeals) Act 1989; Food Safety Act 1990; Food Safety (Northern Ireland) Order 1991; Treaty of Lisbon (Changes in Terminology) Order 2011; Local Government Byelaws (Wales) Act 2012; Byelaws (Alternative Procedure) (England) Regulations 2016
Repealed by	Scotland: Agriculture and Rural Communities (Scotland) Act 2024

Status: Partially repealed

Text of statute as originally enacted

Revised text of statute as amended

Text of the Food Act 1984 as in force today (including any amendments) within the United Kingdom, from legislation.gov.uk.

The Food Act 1984 (c. 30) is an act of the Parliament of the United Kingdom relating to food and markets law. The act consolidates several earlier acts and also enables ministers to pass regulations without further legislation. The Food Act brought additional protection for the consumer from foods harmful to human health, which had previously relied on Victorian era definitions. It also specified the relationship between the government and the recently privatised British Sugar and permitted local authorities to establish cold storage facilities. Much of the act was replaced by the Food Safety Act 1990 but part III, granting powers to local authorities to regulate markets, remains in force.

== Description ==
The act was passed by the Houses of Parliament in 1984, during Conservative Party leader Margaret Thatcher's second term in office as prime minister. It received royal assent on 26 June 1984.

The act was a consolidating act, bringing together existing powers into a single act without significant change. Acts consolidated included the Foods and Drugs Acts from 1955 to 1982, the Sugar Act 1956, the Food and Drugs (Milk) Act 1970 and parts of the European Communities Act 1972, the Local Government Act 1972 and the Local Government (Miscellaneous Provisions) Act 1982. Much of the legislation consolidated had not been substantially updated since 1938. It is also an enabling act, allowing ministers of health and of agriculture to introduce further regulations and codes of practice in the future without additional primary legislation.

The act has seven parts. Part I covers food in general, part II dairy products, part III the regulation of markets, part IV the sale of food by hawkers, part V the sugar beet industry and cold storage, part VI dealt with administrative matters and legal measures and part VII dealt with miscellaneous matters, including allowing ministers to make regulations to accord with European Community provisions. The act has been described by food law writer Stephen J. Fallows as "the corner-stone of the system of food legislation operating in Britain".

=== Repealed enactments ===
Section 134 of the act repealed 25 enactments, listed in schedule 11 to the act.

Citation	Short title	Extent of repeal
4 & 5 Eliz. 2. c. 16	Food and Drugs Act 1955	The whole act
4 & 5 Eliz. 2. c. 48	Sugar Act 1956	The whole act.
10 & 11 Eliz. 2. c. 46	Transport Act 1962	In Part I of Schedule 2, the entry relating to the Food and Drugs Act 1955.
1963 c. 33	London Government Act 1963	Section 54(4). In Schedule 13, Part II.
1967 c. 80	Criminal Justice Act 1967	In Part I of Schedule 3, the entry relating to the Food and Drugs Act 1955.
1968 c. 46	Health Services and Public Health Act 1968	In section 62(1), the words " and in the Food and Drugs Act 1955 references to ships "
1970 c. 3	Food and Drugs (Milk) Act 1970	The whole act.
1971 c. 23	Courts Act 1971	In Part I of Schedule 9, the entry relating to the Food and Drugs Act 1955.
1972 c. 68	European Communities Act 1972	Section 7(3), (4).In Schedule 4. paragraph 3.
1972 c. 70	Local Government Act 1972	Sections 198 and 199.
1973 c. 32	National Health Service Reorganisation Act 1973	In paragraph 123 of Schedule 4, the words " and references to ships in the Food and Drugs Act 1955 ".
1974 c. 3	Slaughterhouses Act 1974	Section 46(2). In Schedule 3, paragraph 1. Schedule 4.
1974 c. 7	Local Government Act 1974	In Schedule 6, paragraph 11.
1976 c. 37	Food and Drugs (Control of Food Premises) Act 1976	The whole act.
1977 c. 45	Criminal Law Act 1977	In Schedule 6, the entry relating to the Food and Drugs Act 1955.
1979 c. 2	Customs and Excise Management Act 1979	In paragraph 12 of Schedule 4, in Part I of the Table, the entry relating to the Food and Drugs Act 1955.
1980 c. 43	Magistrates' Courts Act 1980	In Schedule 7, paragraphs 14 and 15.
1980 c. 65	Local Government, Planning and Land Act 1980	In Schedule 1, paragraphs 6 and 7.
1981 c. 22	Animal Health Act 1981	In Schedule 5, paragraph 2.
1981 c. 26	Food and Drugs (Amendment) Act 1981	The whole act.
1981 c. 67	Acquisition of Land Act 1981	In paragraph 1 of Schedule 4, the entry in the Table relating to the Food and Drugs Act 1955.
1982 c. 26	Food and Drugs (Amendment) Act 1982	The whole act.
1982 c. 30	Local Government (Miscellaneous Provisions) Act 1982	Part IX.
1982 c 48	Criminal Justice Act 1982	In Schedule 3, the entry relating to the Food and Drugs Act 1955.
1983 c. 41	Health and Social Services and Social Security Adjudications Act 1983	Paragraph (a) of section 27.

== Food ==
The act was the most comprehensive set of food safety measures in English law at that point. For the first time the law created offences beyond the limited "adulteration" offence introduced in the Victorian era, bringing the law into line with the development of new food additives, chemicals and processes. Adulteration covered only the addition of deleterious materials to foodstuffs. The Food Act 1984 required that nothing be added or taken away from food to make it unfit for human consumption (to "render the food injurious to health"). As well as the offence of making a food unfit for human consumption the act created offences of selling or advertising such food, even unknowingly.

The act also provided for a general protection for food purchases in that it was an offence to sell food "not of the nature, substance or quality" demanded by the purchaser. This wording has been in British food law since 1875. The "nature" statement relates primarily to natural foods and covers false description by the purchaser, for example misstating the type of fish a product contains. The "substance" clause relates to the composition of the food and includes adulteration, contamination or foreign bodies. The "quality" is a subjective judgement by the court that the food was not to the standard expected and includes, for example, food that has expired. The act states that an offence is only committed where food is sold to the "purchaser's prejudice", meaning no offence arises if the purchaser is made aware of the difference from that expected at the time of purchase.

Most prosecutions under the substance clause tended to be for obvious breaches such as visible mould growth or the presence of foreign bodies. Prosecutions under the quality clause tended to be on the basis of misleading description of the product by the seller. These included otherwise legal products sold as "premium" or "extra quality" where the proportion of poor quality material was greater than the purchaser expected. The maximum penalty for selling sub-standard food was £2,000.

The act also granted ministers the power to request details of the ingredients of any foodstuff from manufacturers. It also regulated the labelling of foods, making it an offence for sellers to falsely describe foodstuff or to use intentionally misleading labelling. The sugar beet portion of the act primarily dealt with the special relationship between the government and the recently privatised British Sugar. The cold storage section dealt mainly with permitting local authorities to establish cold storage facilities for the storage of foods. The act also included 11 schedules which included those setting out specific procedures for sampling of foods.

== Markets ==
Part III of the act regulates markets. It applies to markets of all kinds and not just those dealing with foodstuffs. The act gave local authorities the power to establish markets in their area and to bring existing markets under their control, with the agreement of the existing management. It also permitted them to establish market places and erect market halls.

In 2021 Newark Town Council discovered that its 1329 royal charter permitted only a weekly Wednesday market and an annual May fair. It had been operating additional weekly markets on Mondays, Thursdays, Fridays and Sundays and was required to use the Food Act 1984 to designate these. In November 2022 Leicester City Council used their powers under the act and in combination with their 1199 market charter (granted by King John) to levy a charge of £64 on two Christmas lights switching-on events in Oadby and Wigston.

== Partial replacement ==
Some parts of the act were replaced or extended by the Food Safety Act 1990. The 1990 act modernised the legislation and addressed gaps in coverage. While much of the act was superseded by the 1990 act, Part III relating to markets, remains in force. Aside from the modernisation in 1990, the basic structure of British food law has not changed substantially since 1984, though several new regulations have been introduced by ministers.
