= Beachy Head West =

Conservation areas in the English Channel off the East Sussex coast

- Interactive map of Beachy Head West
- Location: East Sussex, England
- Nearest city: Brighton and Hove
- Area: 24 km^{2} (9.3 sq mi)
- Designation: Marine Conservation Zone
- Established: 21 November 2013
- Governing body: Sussex Inshore Fisheries and Conservation Authority

Beachy Head West Marine Conservation Zone are two spatially separate areas in the English Channel, off the East Sussex coast. They stretch from Brighton Marina in the city of Brighton and Hove to Beachy Head near Eastbourne, with a gap at the mouth of the River Ouse near Newhaven. It covers an area of around 24 square kilometres (9.3 sq mi).

This area includes the Heritage Coast within the South Downs National Park, the eastern half of the UNESCO Brighton and Lewes Downs Biosphere Reserve and part of the Seven Sisters Voluntary Marine Conservation Area.

The two sites contains some of the best examples of underwater chalk habitat in the south-east of England. The chalk reefs and gullies support specialised communities of animals and seaweeds including the rare short-snouted seahorse.

== See also ==
- Geography of Sussex
- Beachy Head
- Kingmere
- Pagham Harbour
- The Mixon
