= Sea Fisheries Committee =

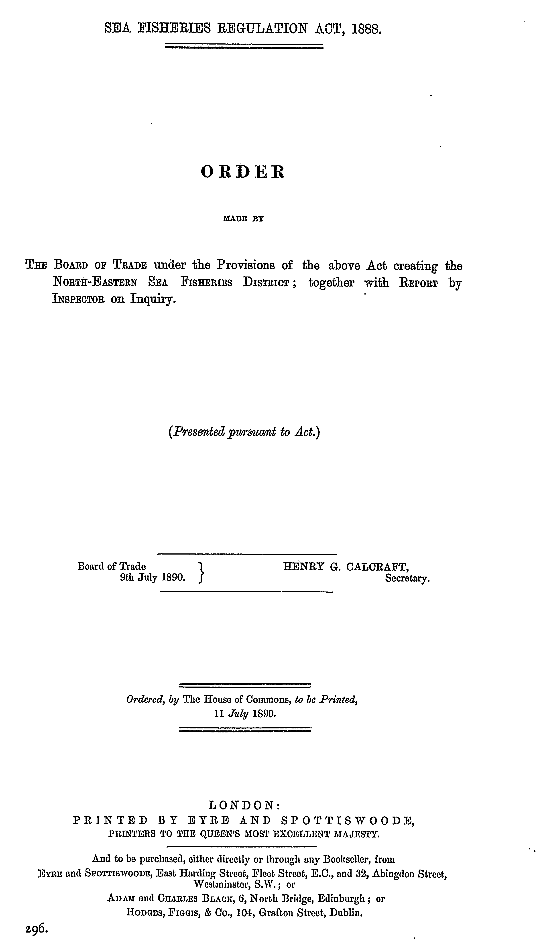
Cover of the order creating the North-Eastern Sea Fisheries District, July 1890

In England and Wales, a Sea Fisheries Committee (SFC; also known in some cases as a Sea Fisheries District Committee), of which there were as many as twelve at one time, was the body responsible for managing a corresponding Sea Fisheries District.

These areas and regulating bodies were established by Statutory Orders made from May 1890, under the Sea Fisheries Regulation Act, 1888.

Each SFC was granted the authority to make bylaws which applied in its district, under powers conferred by the Sea Fisheries Regulation Act 1966.

Various mergers and reorganisations occurred. For example, the Lancashire and the Western SFCs were merged as early as 1900. The Glamorgan Sea Fisheries District Committee, set up in 1890, and the Milford Haven Sea Fisheries Committee, set up in 1892, merged in 1912 to become the South Wales Sea Fisheries District Committee.

On 1 April 2010, the North Western and North Wales SFC became the North West SFC, with responsibility for the Welsh part of its district transferred to the Welsh Government, along with those of the South Wales SFC, both under the Marine and Coastal Access Act 2009 (Commencement No. 1, Consequential, Transitional and Savings Provisions) (England and Wales) Order 2010 (S.I. 2010/630 (C.42)).

On 1 April 2011, the SFCs were replaced by ten Inshore Fisheries and Conservation Authorities.

== List ==
The twelve SFCs were:

- Cornwall Sea Fisheries Committee
- Cumbria Sea Fisheries Committee
- Devon Sea Fisheries Committee
- Isles of Scilly Sea Fisheries Committee
- Kent and Essex Sea Fisheries Committee
- Lancashire and Western Sea Fisheries Committee
- North Eastern Sea Fisheries Committee
- North Wales Sea Fisheries Committee (After some reorganisation, the North Western and North Wales SFC (from 2010 the North West SFC) was formed.)
- Northumberland Sea Fisheries Committee
- Southern Sea Fisheries Committee
- South Wales Sea Fisheries Committee (from 1912 to 2010; formed from the Glamorgan SFC and the Milford Haven SFC)
- Sussex Sea Fisheries Committee
