= Local Government Byelaws (Wales) Act 2012 =

Act of the National Assembly for Wales

Local Government Byelaws (Wales) Act 2012 (Note: Section 23.)
- Act of the National Assembly for Wales
- National Assembly for Wales
- Long title: An Act of the National Assembly for Wales to make provision for the powers of county councils, county borough councils, community councils and other public bodies to make byelaws; the procedure for making byelaws; the enforcement of byelaws; and for connected purposes.
- Citation: 2012 anaw 2
- Introduced by: Carl Sargeant AM, Minister for Local Government and Communities
- Territorial extent: Wales

Dates
- Royal assent: 29 November 2012
- Commencement: various (Note: Section 22.)

Other legislation
- Amends: Public Health Act 1875; Open Spaces Act 1906; Land Drainage Act 1991; Countryside and Rights of Way Act 2000

Status: Current legislation

History of passage through the Assembly

Text of statute as originally enacted

Revised text of statute as amended

Text of the Local Government Byelaws (Wales) Act 2012 as in force today (including any amendments) within the United Kingdom, from legislation.gov.uk.

The Local Government Byelaws (Wales) Act 2012 (anaw 2) (Welsh: Deddf Is-ddeddfau Llywodraeth Leol (Cymru) 2012) is an act of the National Assembly for Wales for giving local authorities in Wales the ability to make byelaws.

== History ==
The bill was referred to the Supreme Court which upheld it. Lady Hale noted "Constitutional adjudication is a new animal for us... [This case] comes before the [supreme] court, not in a concrete case, but as pure constitutional review along continental lines. This is, as far as I know, the first case in which this has happened. We are not used to deciding cases in the abstract, without reference to a particular set of facts."

It was the first devolved bill to be referred to the Supreme Court before royal assent.

== Provisions ==
The act replaces the process for Welsh ministers and the UK ministers to approve byelaws made by local authorities in Wales. The Supreme Court ruled that the provisions removing powers of UK ministers were "incidental to" and "consequential on" the main purpose of the law, which was to remove powers of the Welsh ministers.

== Reception ==
The process of approval of Welsh laws by UK ministers has been described as anachronistic.

== Comparison to other UK jurisdictions ==
The UK Parliament, Scottish Parliament and Northern Ireland Assembly retain control for approving bye-laws.

== Examples of bye-laws ==
Under the act, Conwy County Borough Council introduced a byelaw "to prohibit the feeding of seagulls on North Shore, Llandudno, this should be finalised later this year."

Byelaws can be used to enabling the clamping of cars.
