= Local Government (Miscellaneous Provisions) Act 1982 =

Act of the Parliament of the United Kingdom

Local Government (Miscellaneous Provisions) Act 1982 (Note: Section 49(1).)
- Act of Parliament
- Parliament of the United Kingdom
- Long title: An Act to make amendments for England and Wales of provisions of that part of the law relating to local authorities or highways which is commonly amended by local Acts; to make provision for the control of sex establishments; to make further provision for the control of refreshment premises and for consultation between local authorities in England and Wales and fire authorities with regard to fire precautions for buildings and caravan sites; to repeal the Theatrical Employers Registration Acts 1925 and 1928; to make further provision as to the enforcement of section 8 of the Public Utilities Street Works Act 1950 and sections 171 and 174 of the Highways Act 1980; to make provision in connection with the computerisation of local land charges registers; to make further provision in connection with the acquisition of land and rights over land by boards constituted in pursuance of section 1 of the Town and Country Planning Act 1971 or reconstituted in pursuance of Schedule 17 to the Local Government Act 1972; to exclude from the definition of "construction or maintenance work" in section 20 of the Local Government, Planning and Land Act 1980 work undertaken by local authorities and development bodies pursuant to certain agreements with the Manpower Services Commission which specify the work to be undertaken and under which the Commission agrees to pay the whole or part of the cost of the work so specified; to define "year" for the purposes of Part III of the said Act of 1980; to amend section 140 of the Local Government Act 1972 and to provide for the insurance by local authorities of persons voluntarily assisting probation committees; to make provision for controlling nuisance and disturbance on educational premises; to amend section 137 of the Local Government Act 1972; to make further provision as to arrangements made by local authorities under the Employment and Training Act 1973; to extend the duration of certain powers to assist industry or employment conferred by local Acts; to make corrections and minor improvements in certain enactments relating to the local administration of health and planning functions; and for connected purposes.
- Citation: 1982 c. 30
- Territorial extent: England and Wales (Note: Section 49(2).)

Dates
- Royal assent: 13 July 1982
- Commencement: 13 July 1982 (Note: Section 4(b) of the Interpretation Act 1978.)
Other legislation
Amends	Hypnotism Act 1952; London Government Act 1963; Late Night Refreshment Houses Act 1969; Senior Courts Act 1981
Repeals/revokes	Theatrical Employers Registration Act 1925; Home Counties (Music and Dancing) Licensing Act 1926; Theatrical Employers Registration (Amendment) Act 1928; Royal County of Berkshire (Public Entertainment) Provisional Order Confirmation Act 1976
Amended by	Public Health (Control of Disease) Act 1984; Food Act 1984; Building Act 1984; Planning (Consequential Provisions) Act 1990; Statute Law (Repeals) Act 2004; Policing and Crime Act 2017

Status: Amended

Text of statute as originally enacted

Revised text of statute as amended

Text of the Local Government (Miscellaneous Provisions) Act 1982 as in force today (including any amendments) within the United Kingdom, from legislation.gov.uk.

The Local Government (Miscellaneous Provisions) Act 1982 (c. 30) is an act of the Parliament of the United Kingdom that grants a variety of powers to local authorities in England and Wales, including the power to regulate public entertainment, sex establishments, street trading, and take-away food shops.

== See also ==
- Street trading licence
- Sex establishment licence
- Licensing Act 2003
