= Open Spaces Act 1906 =

Act of the Parliament of the United Kingdom

Open Spaces Act 1906 (Note: Section 25.)
- Act of Parliament
- Parliament of the United Kingdom
- Long title: An Act to consolidate Enactments relating to Open Spaces.
- Citation: 6 Edw. 7. c. 25
- Territorial extent: England and Wales; Ireland; (Note: Sections 21 and 22.)

Dates
- Royal assent: 4 August 1906
- Commencement: 1 January 1907 (Note: Section 24.)
Other legislation
Amends	See § Repealed enactments
Repeals/revokes	See § Repealed enactments
Amended by	Statute Law Revision Act 1927; Parish Councils Act 1957; Charities Act 1960; London Government Act 1963; Charities Act 1993; Statute Law (Repeals) Act 1993; Law Reform (Miscellaneous Provisions) (Northern Ireland) Order 2005; Charities Act 2006; Charities Act 2011; Local Government Byelaws (Wales) Act 2012; Crime and Courts Act 2013; Justice Act (Northern Ireland) 2015; Byelaws (Alternative Procedure) (England) Regulations 2016

Status: Amended

Text of statute as originally enacted

Revised text of statute as amended

Text of the Open Spaces Act 1906 as in force today (including any amendments) within the United Kingdom, from legislation.gov.uk.

The Open Spaces Act 1906 (6 Edw. 7. c. 25) is an act of the Parliament of the United Kingdom that consolidated enactments relating to open spaces in England and Wales and Ireland.

== Provisions ==
An open space is defined under the act is defined as land which has less than 5% of its area occupied by buildings and the rest used for a garden or recreation.

The act established a set of bylaws which clearly defined acceptable behaviour in the parks and public squares in London.

Land acquired by local authorities is held subject to statutory trusts as defined by section 10 of the act. This means that disposal of land by way of a lease is prohibited in cases where no public access to the land would be permitted.

The act allowed local authorities to purchase common land.

=== Repealed enactments ===
Section 23 of the act repealed 5 enactments, listed in the schedule to the act.

Citation	Short title	Extent of repeal
40 & 41 Vict. c. 35	Metropolitan Open Spaces Act 1877	The whole act.
44 & 45 Vict. c. 34	Metropolitan Open Spaces Act 1881	The whole act.
50 & 51 Vict. c. 32	Open Spaces Act 1887	The whole act except the provisions of section four amending the Disused Burial Grounds Act 1884.
53 & 54 Vict. c. 15	Open Spaces Act 1890	The whole act.
62 & 63 Vict. c. 30	Commons Act 1899	Section seventeen.

== Subsequent developments ==
The commencement provision (section 24) and the repeal schedule were themselves repealed by the Statute Law Revision Act 1927 (17 & 18 Geo. 5. c. 42).

Section 7(3) of the act was repealed, and the act was extended, by section 8(1) of, and schedule 2 to, the Parish Councils Act 1957 (5 & 6 Eliz. 2. c. 42).

The act was extended (except section 14) by section 58(1) of the London Government Act 1963 (c. 33).

References in the act to charity law have been updated on several occasions, including by the Charities Act 1960, the Charities Act 1993, the Charities Act 2006, and the Charities Act 2011.
