= Inshore Fisheries and Conservation Authority =

Marine inshore environment management organisation

There are ten Inshore Fisheries and Conservation Authorities (IFCAs) in England. The ten IFCA Districts cover English coastal waters out to 6 nautical miles from Territorial Baselines. Although autonomous, all IFCAs have a shared 'vision' to "lead, champion and manage a sustainable marine environment and inshore fisheries, by successfully securing the right balance between social, environmental and economic benefits to ensure healthy seas, sustainable fisheries and a viable industry". IFCAs have shared powers and duties which are found in the Marine and Coastal Access Act, 2009.

The ten IFCAs are:

- Southern Inshore Fisheries and Conservation Authority
- Devon and Severn Inshore Fisheries and Conservation Authority
- Cornwall Inshore Fisheries and Conservation Authority
- Isles of Scilly Inshore Fisheries and Conservation Authority
- North Western Inshore Fisheries and Conservation Authority
- Northumberland Inshore Fisheries and Conservation Authority
- North Eastern Inshore Fisheries and Conservation Authority
- Eastern Inshore Fisheries and Conservation Authority
- Kent and Essex Inshore Fisheries and Conservation Authority
- Sussex Inshore Fisheries and Conservation Authority

The membership of IFCA committees is made up of 'general members' appointed by the Marine Management Organisation for their skills and experience relevant to the management of inshore fisheries. The general members are joined by local authority appointed members, appointed by the constituent authorities which fund the IFCAs. On each IFCA a member is also appointed from Natural England, the Marine Management Organisation and the Environment Agency.

Under s.153 of the Marine and Coastal Access Act 2009 (1) The authority for an IFC district must manage the exploitation of sea fisheries resources in that district. (2) In performing its duty under subsection (1), the authority for an IFC district must: (a) seek to ensure that the exploitation of sea fisheries resources is carried out in a sustainable way, (b) seek to balance the social and economic benefits of exploiting the sea fisheries resources of the district with the need to protect the marine environment from, or to promote its recovery from, the effects of such exploitation, (c) take any other steps which in the authority's opinion are necessary or expedient for the purpose of making a contribution to the achievement of sustainable development, and (d) seek to balance the different needs of persons engaged in the exploitation of sea fisheries resources in the district

Under s.154 of the Marine and Coastal Access Act 2009 IFCAs must further the conservation objectives of marine conservation zones.

IFCAs are funded by Local Authorities and this funding is, in part, underpinned by Defra via an Area Based Grant of c. £3 million annually. Since the ten IFCAs were created in 2011, they have been responsible for transforming the way fishing activities are undertaken in Marine Protected Areas as a consequence of the UK government's "revised approach to the management of commercial fishing in European Marine Sites" and have introduced 17 byelaws to protect the most vulnerable features within European Marine Sites. Southern IFCA has introduced measures which restrict Bottom Towed Fishing Gear from 25% of the IFCA District. IFCAs are also progressing measures to balance the needs of the commercial and recreational fisheries and examples of emerging plans are seen in Devon and Severn IFCA.

All ten IFCAs each own and operate Fisheries Patrol Vessels, which range from the 27m coastal Patrol Vessel FPV Saint Piran operated by Cornwall IFCA to smaller rigid inflatable vessels. The IFCAs also operate research vessels, deploying side scan sonar and underwater cameras to inform their management.

Every four years a report on the conduct and operations of IFCAs is presented to the UK parliament. The 2014-2018 report found that IFCAs "have demonstrated the local leadership that is expected of them as statutory regulators" and that "future funding, compounded by increasing responsibilities, also emerges as a significant factor in the effective delivery of the IFCAs' statutory duties".

The IFCAs are represented nationally by the Association of Inshore Fisheries and Conservation Authorities.
