= Pagham Harbour =

Former harbour now nature reserve in southern England

Coordinates: 50.764°N 0.765°W

- Site of Special Scientific Interest
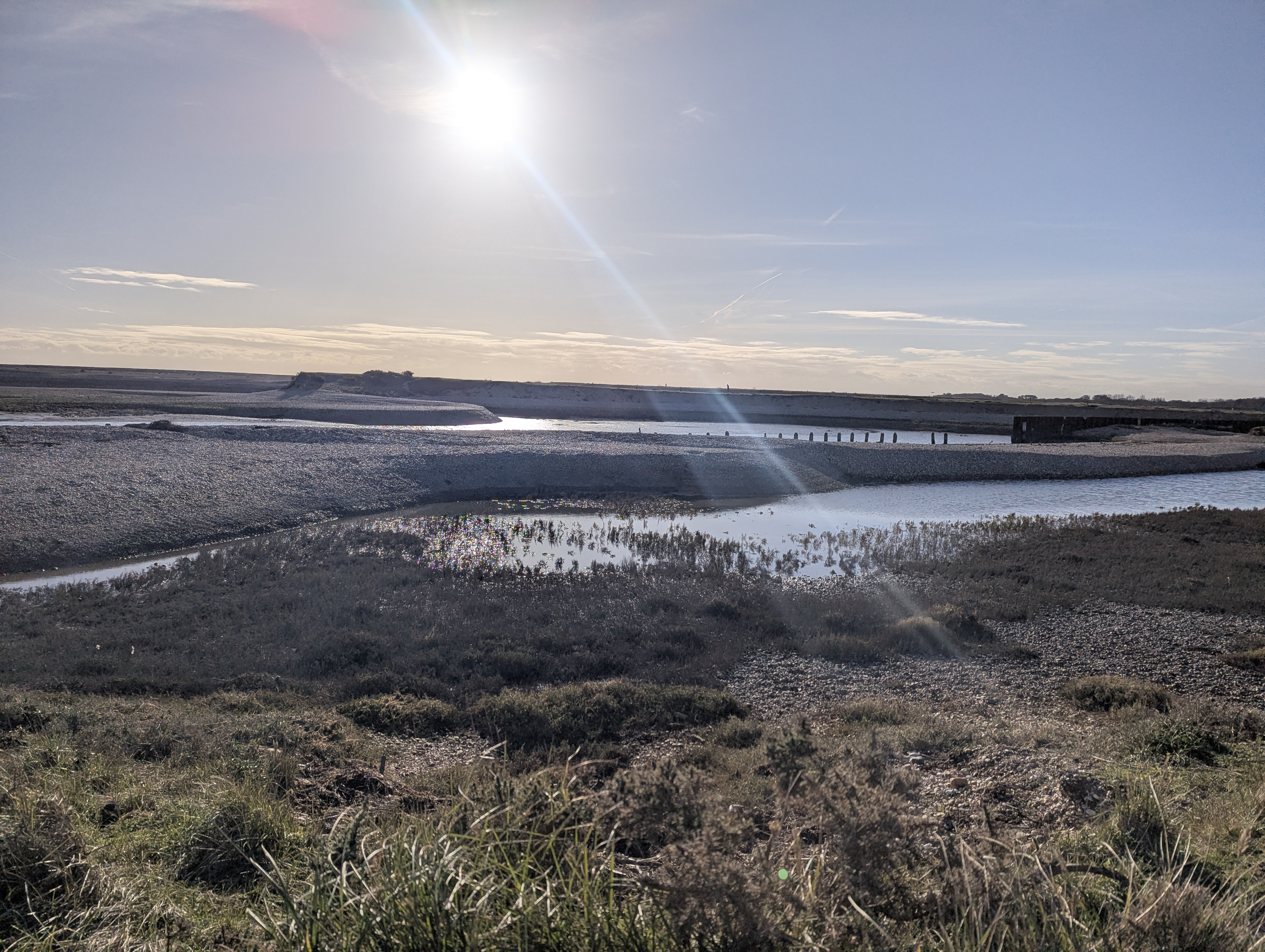
- Location of Pagham Harbour.
- Area of search: West Sussex
- Grid reference: SZ 872 968
- Interest: Biological; Geological
- Area: 629.0 hectares (1,554 acres)
- Notification date: 1986
- Location map: Department for Environment, Food and Rural Affairs map

Pagham Harbour is a 629-hectare (1,550-acre) biological and geological Site of Special Scientific Interest on the western outskirts of Bognor Regis in West Sussex. It is a Geological Conservation Review site, a Nature Conservation Review site, a Ramsar site, a Special Protection Area and a Marine Conservation Zone. An area of 599.1 hectares (1,480 acres) is a RSPB Local Nature Reserve.

Land owners of the harbour include the Royal Society for the Protection of Birds, the Crown Estate and the Church Commissioners.

The harbour forms an area of saltmarsh and shallow lagoons. It is not an estuary, as no major streams enter the harbour: the only freshwater inflow comes from a few small streams draining surrounding fields.

== History ==
In earlier times Pagham Harbour was a working harbour with three ports. One port was situated at the western end, of the harbour near Sidlesham Mill, (Note: A tidemill was built in 1755 by Woodruffe Drinkwater of Chichester. It had three water-wheels, and eight pair of stones, capable of grinding a load of corn in an hour. The last mill ceased operations in 1865 and was dismantled in about 1918, the bricks and flagstones were re-used in local construction.) and was known as Wardur. The port of Charlton was at the entrance to the harbour, and the third was on the Pagham side of the harbour and was known as the port of Wythering (Wyderinges).

The port of Wardur was part of "New Haven", a development in the Middle Ages. The port of Wythering was overrun by the sea in the 13th century and the whole harbour eventually silted up and ceased to be navigable, except by small craft.

An attempt was made to drain the harbour for farming in c. 1873 with an embankment constructed across the edge of the lagoon to hold back the sea; this failed during a storm in December 1910 and was not reconstructed.

During World War II the area from Pagham Harbour to the eastern edge of Selsey was subject to tight security, as component parts for the Mulberry Harbours were constructed there during the build up to D-Day.

== Pagham Harbour today ==
At present the harbour entrance to the sea is just over 40 metres wide.

Pagham Harbour today, is one of the few undeveloped stretches of the Sussex coast. It has a sheltered inlet. The harbour is designated as a nature reserve and is an internationally important wetland site for wildlife. It is 629 hectares (1,550 acres) in size.

=== The local nature reserve ===
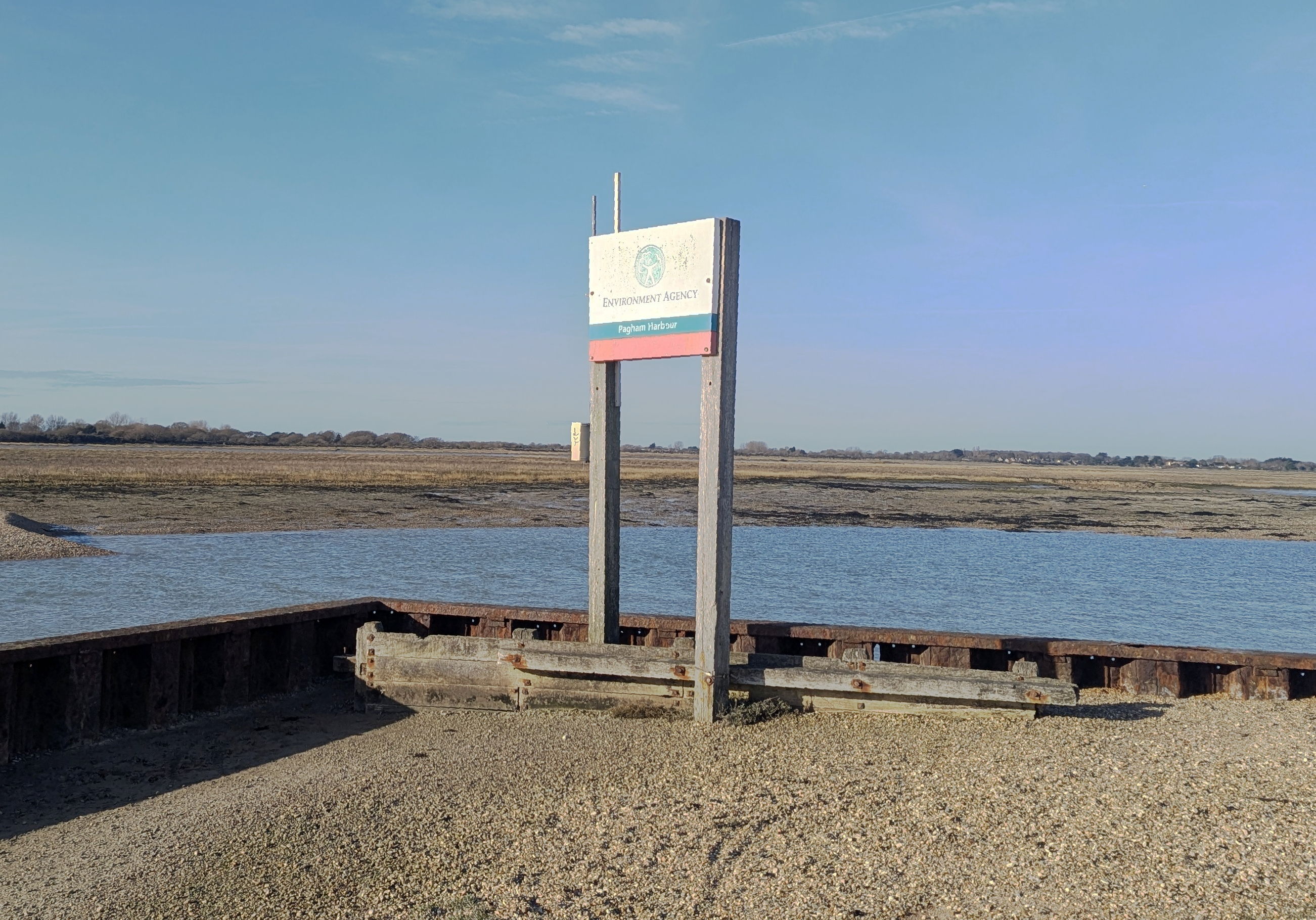
A photo of the Environment Agency sign at Pagham Harbour

The local nature reserve (LNR) is accessed via the B2145 Selsey road. The LNR is managed by the RSPB and is made up of saltmarsh and tidal mudflats with shingle, open water, reed swamp and wet permanent grassland habitats. Examples of birds that have been spotted at the reserve are Little Ringed Plovers, Wood Sandpipers, Avocets, Grey Wagtails, Black-tailed Godwits, Pied Wagtails, Shelducks and Red-necked Phalaropes.
