= Horse sense =

Horse sense may mean:

- Common sense
- Horse Sense, a 1999 film by the Disney Channel
- "Horse Sense" (All Creatures Great and Small), a 1978 television episode
- The senses of the horse
