= Prolapse =

Condition in which organs fall down or slip out of place

In medicine, prolapse is a condition in which organs fall down or slip out of place. It is used for organs protruding through the vagina, rectum, or for the misalignment of the valves of the heart. A spinal disc herniation is also sometimes called "disc prolapse". Prolapse means "to fall out of place", from the Latin prolabi meaning "to fall out".

Relating to the uterus, prolapse condition results in an inferior extension of the organ into the vagina, caused by weakened pelvic muscles.

== Humans ==
=== Heart valve prolapse ===
The main type of prolapse of heart valves in humans is mitral valve prolapse (MVP), which is a valvular heart disease characterized by the displacement of an abnormally thickened mitral valve leaflet into the left atrium during systole.

Tricuspid valve prolapse can cause tricuspid regurgitation.

=== Rectal prolapse ===
Rectal prolapse is a condition in which part of the wall or the entire wall of the rectum falls out of place. Rectal prolapse can be a medical emergency. In some cases, the rectum may protrude.

Symptoms of a rectal prolapse may be:

- Leakage of stool
- Bleeding, anal pain, itching, irritation
- Tissue that protrudes from the rectum

A surgeon may operate through the abdomen to secure part of the large intestine or rectum to the inside of the abdominal cavity (rectopexy). Sometimes the surgeon removes the affected part of the intestine.

Surgery also can be done through the perineum (the area between the genitals and the anus) to remove the prolapsing tissue.

Surgery is most often successful for people who still have some control over their bowel movements. If the anal sphincter is damaged, surgery may correct the prolapse but not be able to completely correct fecal incontinence (lack of control of bowel movements). Fecal incontinence can both potentially improve or deteriorate after prolapse surgery.

If the lining has fallen out of the anus and is around 7 cm or less, it should eventually retract back inside naturally, though the retraction can take up to four days.

=== Female genital prolapse ===
Uterine prolapse (or pelvic organ prolapse) occurs when the female pelvic organs fall from their normal position, into or through the vagina. Occurring in women of all ages, it is more common as women age, particularly in those who have delivered large babies or had exceedingly long pushing phases of labor. Smoking, obesity, connective tissue disorders, upper respiratory disorders‚ and repetitive strain injuries can all increase prolapse risk. Minor prolapse can be treated with exercises to strengthen the pelvic floor muscles (pelvic physiotherapy); more serious prolapse, e.g., complete procidentia, requires pessary use or reconstructive surgical treatment. Reconstructive pelvic prolapse surgery may be done without resorting to complete hysterectomy by hysteropexy, the resuspension of the prolapsed uterus. Traditional gynecologic practice favors removal of the uterus or ovaries (or both) at the time of prolapse surgery, and one estimate states that of the 600,000 hysterectomies performed in the United States every year, 13 percent are for prolapse. However, there is concern that many of these hysterectomies may be unnecessary and that hysteropexy would suffice as a treatment instead.

=== Pelvic floor prolapse ===
The rectum or urinary bladder may prolapse as a result of changes in the integrity of connective tissue in the posterior or anterior vaginal walls, respectively, resulting in pelvic floor prolapse. Symptoms may include a feeling of pressure in the pelvis, or the visible protrusion of organs from the vagina. Prolapse is almost never painful, but the change in position of organs may cause urinary or bowel symptoms.

Pessaries are a treatment option for pelvic organ prolapse.

=== Umbilical cord prolapse ===
Umbilical cord prolapse occurs when the umbilical cord comes out of the uterus with or before the presenting part of the fetus. It is a relatively rare condition and occurs in fewer than 1% of pregnancies. Cord prolapse is more common in women who have had rupture of their amniotic sac. Other risk factors include maternal or fetal factors that prevent the fetus from occupying a normal position in the maternal pelvis, such as abnormal fetal lie, too much amniotic fluid, or a premature or small fetus. The concern with cord prolapse is that pressure on the cord from the fetus will cause cord compression that compromises blood flow to the fetus. Whenever there is a sudden decrease in fetal heart rate or abnormal fetal heart tracing, umbilical cord prolapse should be considered. Due to the possibility for fetal death and other complications, umbilical cord prolapse is considered an obstetric emergency during pregnancy or labor. Current management guidelines focus on quick delivery, which usually entails a cesarean section. With appropriate management, the majority of cases have good neonatal outcomes.

== Other species ==
=== Reptiles ===
Genital prolapse has been reported in snakes and turtles.

=== Birds ===
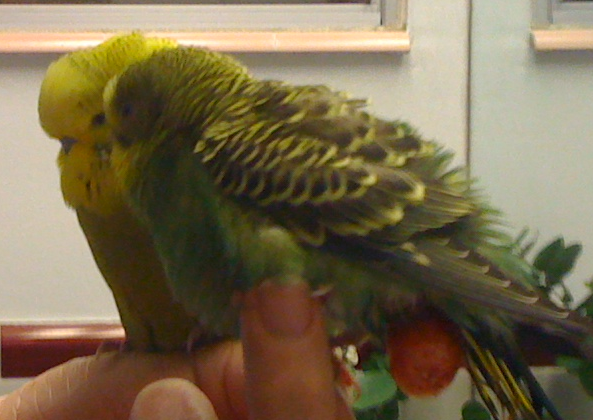
An egg-bound budgerigar hen with a prolapsed vagina and her mate

Oviduct prolapse is an often fatal condition in birds. When an egg is laid, the vagina everts through the cloaca to deliver the egg. Large eggs and avian obesity are contributors to this condition. Immediate veterinary assistance is paramount to the survival of a bird with prolapse. Even with immediate medical intervention the chances for survival are usually uncertain. Untreated birds will begin to tear at the injury site, and other flockmates will begin to cannibalize the prolapse area, a behaviour commonly known as pickout.

=== Cattle ===
Prolapsed uterus in cattle, particularly dairy cattle, generally occurs in the first 12 hours post-calving. Frequent causes are hypocalcemia combined with irritation of the birth canal, causing straining. Replacement of the protrusion, which can range from the size of a softball to the hanging of the entire uterus down below the hocks, is performed with the cow in sternal recumbency, an epidural injection, and hindlimbs 'frogged' rearwards to allow the pelvis to tip forward, easing replacement. Careful washing and cleaning prior to replacement is important as is ensuring that the horns are completely everted once inside the cow. Often a Buhner suture is placed in the vulva to prevent subsequent reprolapse. Another type of reproductive prolapse in cattle is so-called bovine vaginal prolapse.

=== Sheep ===
Same as in cows.

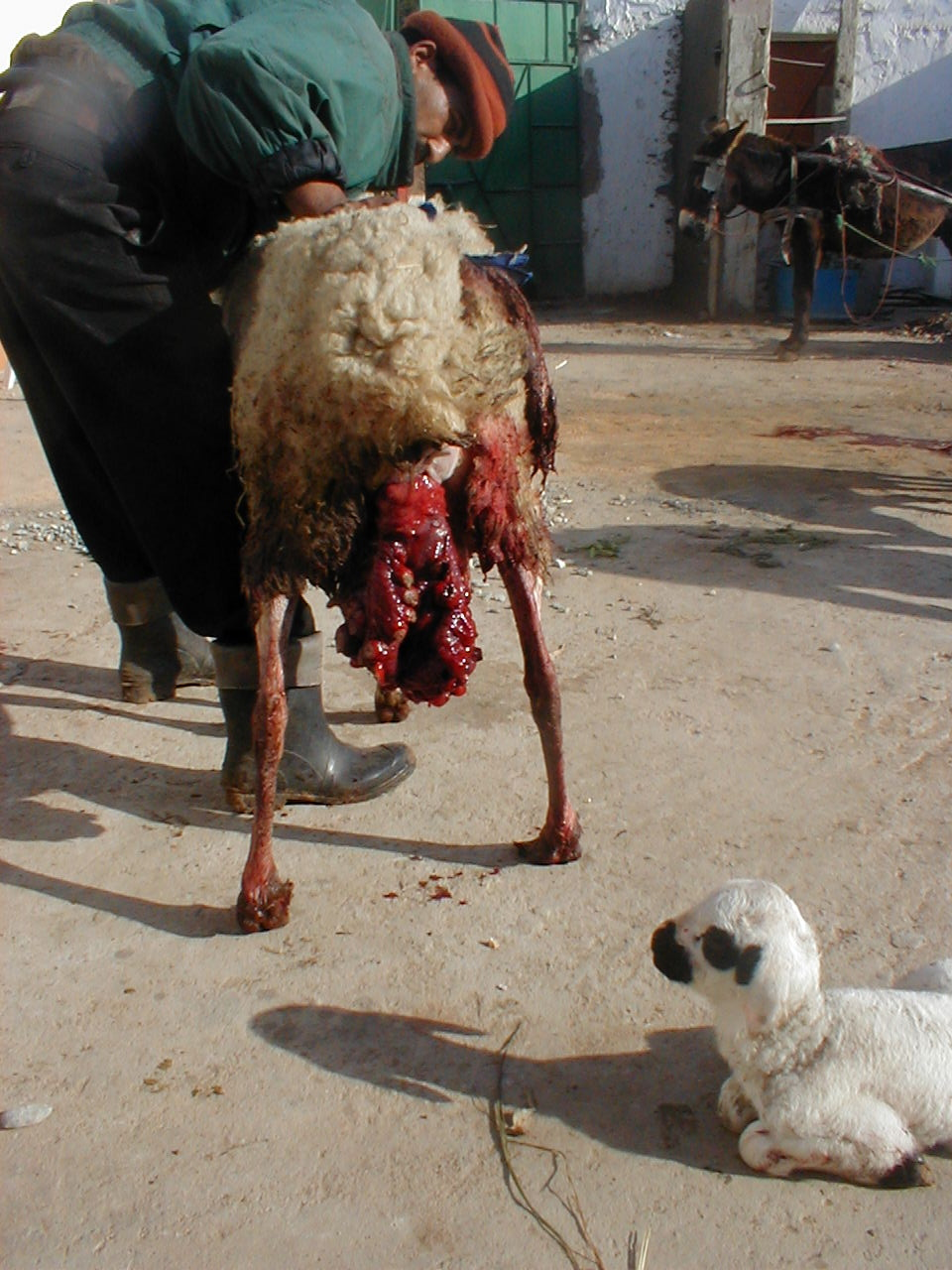
With newborn lamb

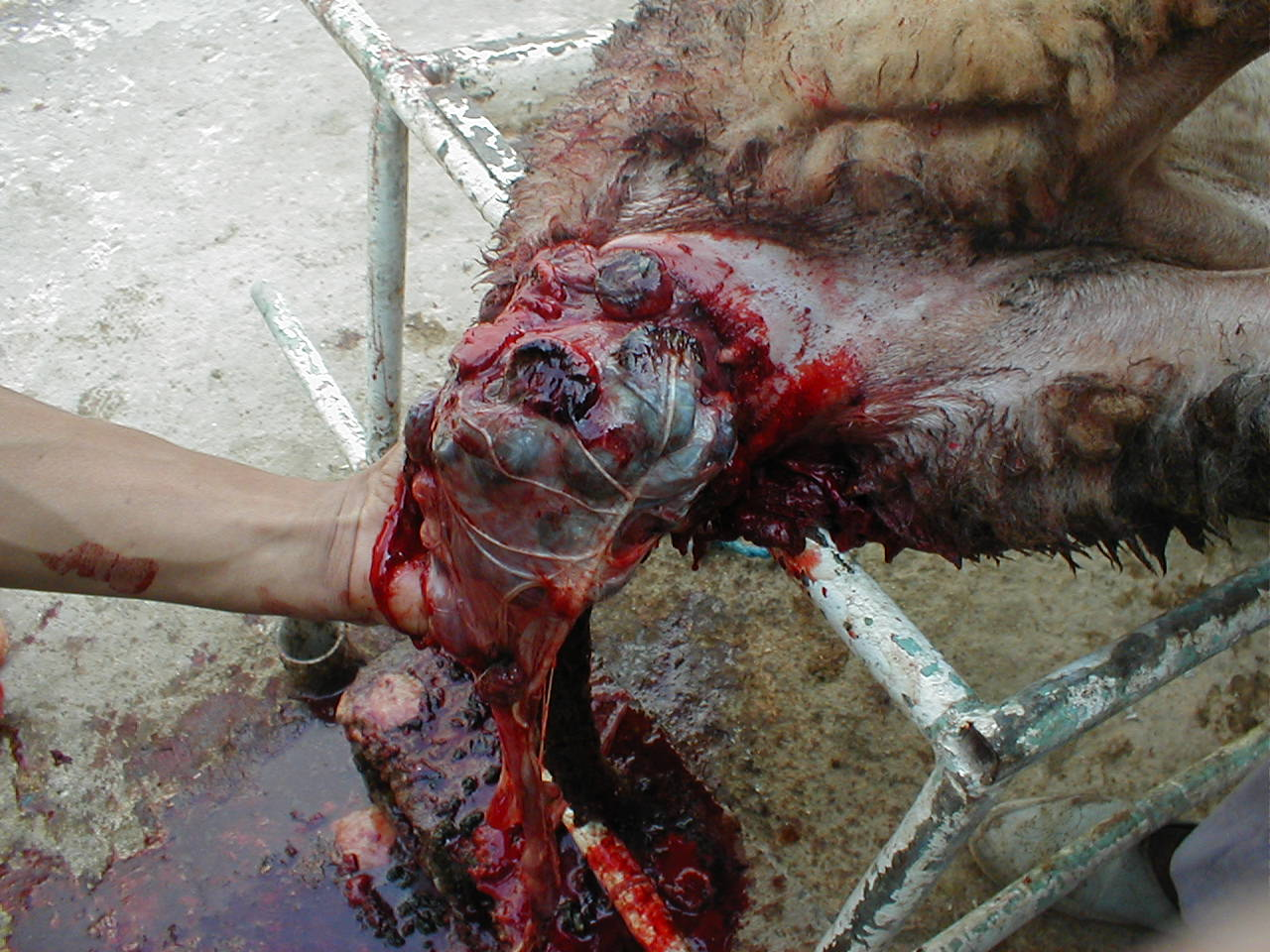
With afterbirth

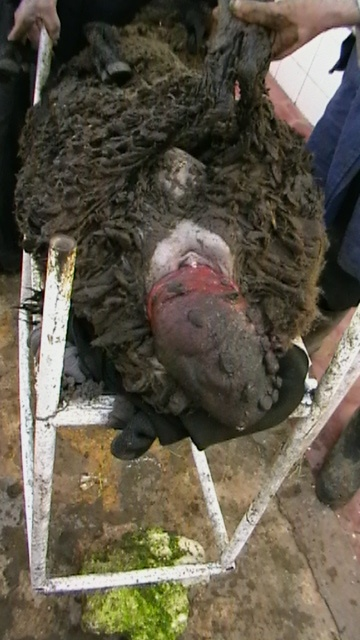
Stained uterus (12 hours out)

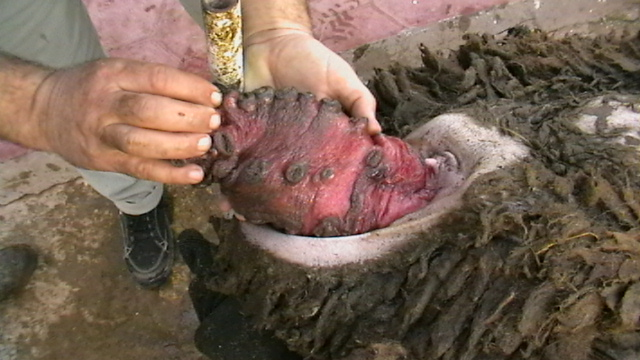
Before re-positioning

=== Pigs ===
Rectal prolapse is a condition routinely identified in pigs on farms and at slaughterhouses. If not reduced quickly, prolapses in pigs become necrotic and infected, and risk being cannibalized by other pen mates. If the latter happens it normally results in death of the animal by sepsis, shock or faecal peritonitis.

=== Horses and mules ===
Rectal prolapse occurring in horse and mule would be better termed anal prolapse, as it only involves mucous membrane moving posteriorly to form a circular protrusion outside the anus The condition is not painful.

In mares after parturition, it is described as a 10 to 60 mm mucous protrusion.

Anal prolapse in young mules and foals occurs with a frequency similar to that of Gasterophilus haemorrhoidalis. In extensive breeding conditions, the disease is only recognized after some days, leading to intense edema of prolapsed tissues and necrosis of the mucous membrane.

Early cases in should be treated with the application of hygroscopic substances like powdered sugar followed by purse-string suturing. When prolapsed tissues are edematous and necrotic, amputation is performed. The prognosis is fair as the removed tissues do not contain any important organs or large blood vessels.

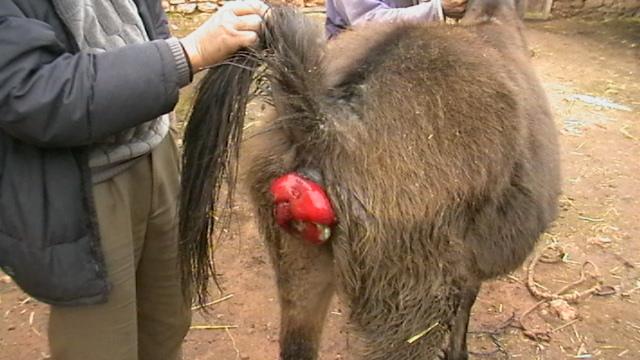
on a mule

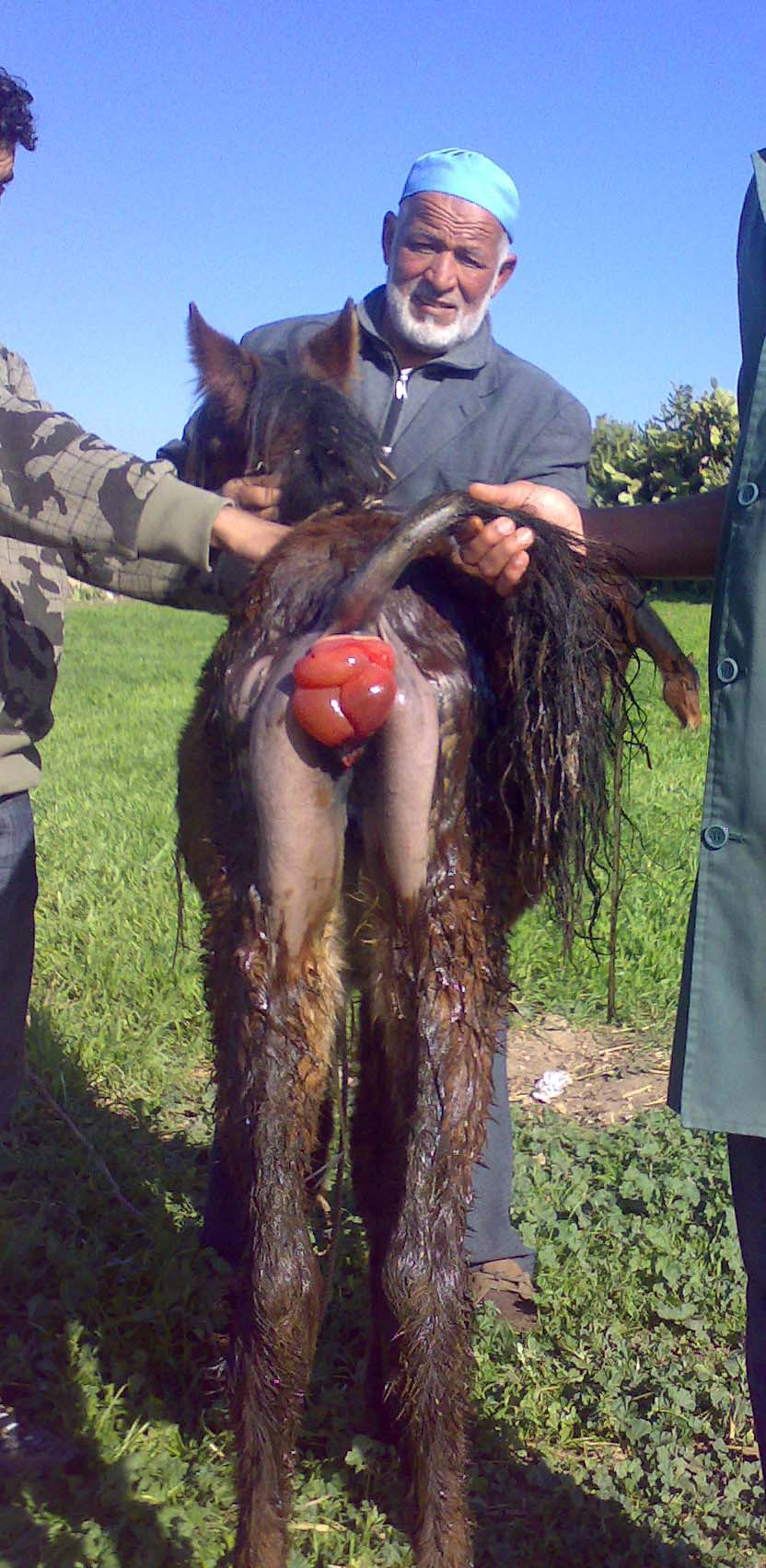
on a foal

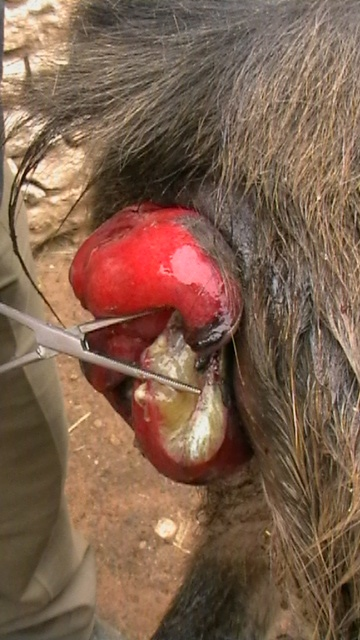
submucosal edema

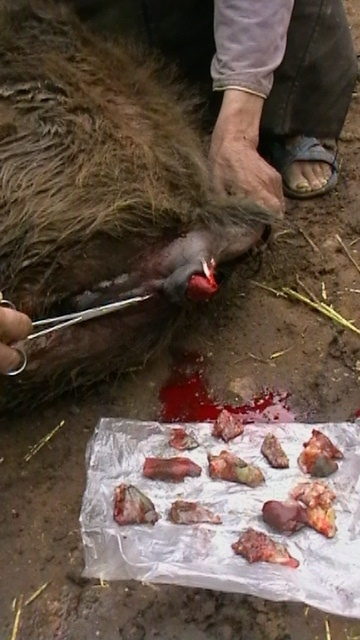
Simple removal of prolapsed edematous tissues
