= Hereford cattle =

British beef cattle breed

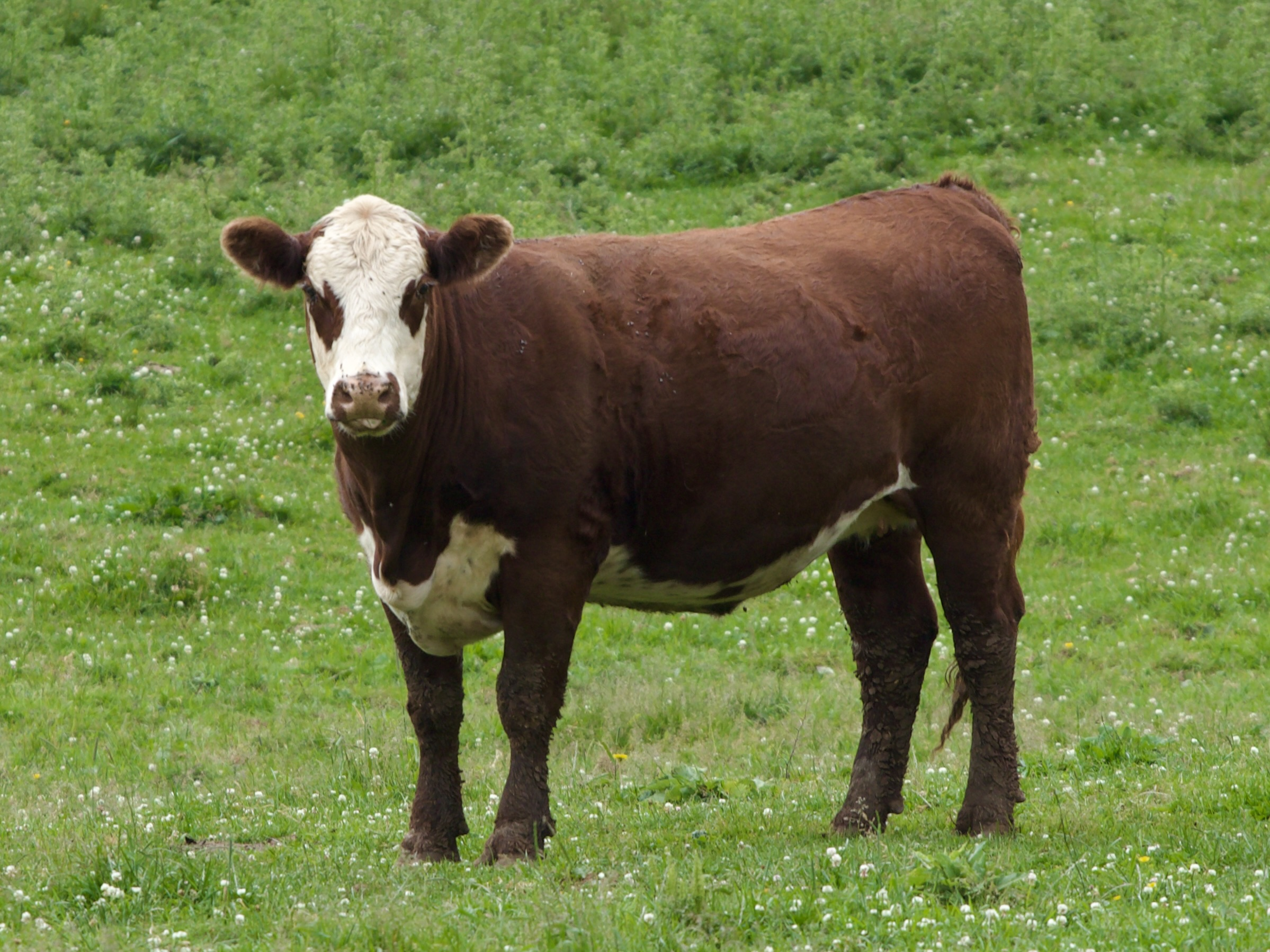
- Hereford cow near Souris, in Prince Edward Island
- Conservation status: DAD-IS (2023): not at risk
- Country of origin: United Kingdom
- Distribution: more than 60 countries
- Use: beef

Traits
- Weight: Male: 1075 kg (2350 lb); Female: 675 kg (1500 lb)
- Height: Male: 152 cm (60 in); Female: 140 cm (55 in)
- Coat: red and white
- Horn status: horned or polled
- Cattle; Bos (primigenius) taurus

The Hereford is a British breed of beef cattle originally from Herefordshire in the West Midlands of England. It was the result of selective breeding from the mid-eighteenth century by a few families in Herefordshire, beginning some decades before the noted work of Robert Bakewell.

It has spread to many countries; in 2023 the populations reported by 62 countries totalled over seven million head; populations of over 100000 were reported by Uruguay, Brazil and Chile. The breed reached Ireland in 1775, and a few went to Kentucky in the United States in 1817; the modern American Hereford derives from a herd established in 1840 in Albany, New York. It was present in Australia before 1850, and in Argentina from 1858. In the twenty-first century there are breed societies in those countries and in the Czech Republic, Denmark, Estonia, France, Hungary, the Netherlands, Norway, Portugal, Spain and Sweden in Europe; in Brazil, Chile, Paraguay and Uruguay in South America; in New Zealand; and in South Africa.

== History ==
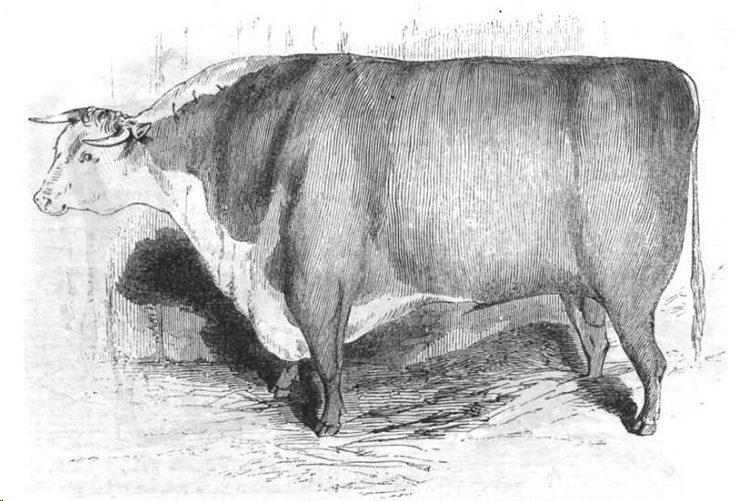
Bull of Mr. Jeffries, winner of first prize of the Royal Agricultural Show in Derby in 1843

Until the 18th century, the cattle of Herefordshire resembled other cattle of southern England, being wholly red with a white switch, similar to the modern North Devon and Sussex breeds. In the late 18th and early 19th centuries, other cattle (mainly Shorthorns) were used to create a new type of draught and beef cattle which at first varied in colour, with herds ranging from yellow to grey and light brown, and with varying amounts of white. By the end of the 18th century, the white face characteristic of the modern breed was well established, as was the modern colour during the 19th century.

The Hereford is still seen in the Herefordshire countryside today and featured strongly at agricultural shows. The first imports of Herefords to the United States were made about 1817 by the politician Henry Clay, with larger importation beginning in the 1840s.

== Polled Hereford ==
The Polled Hereford is an American hornless variant of Hereford with a polled gene, a natural genetic mutation selected into a separate breed from 1889.

Iowa cattle rancher Warren Gammon capitalised on the idea of breeding Polled Herefords and started the registry with 11 naturally polled cattle. The American Polled Hereford Association (APHA) was formed in 1910. The American Polled Hereford and American Hereford breeds have been combined since 1995 under the same American Hereford Association name.

In Australia, the breed is known as the Poll Hereford.

== Traditional Hereford ==
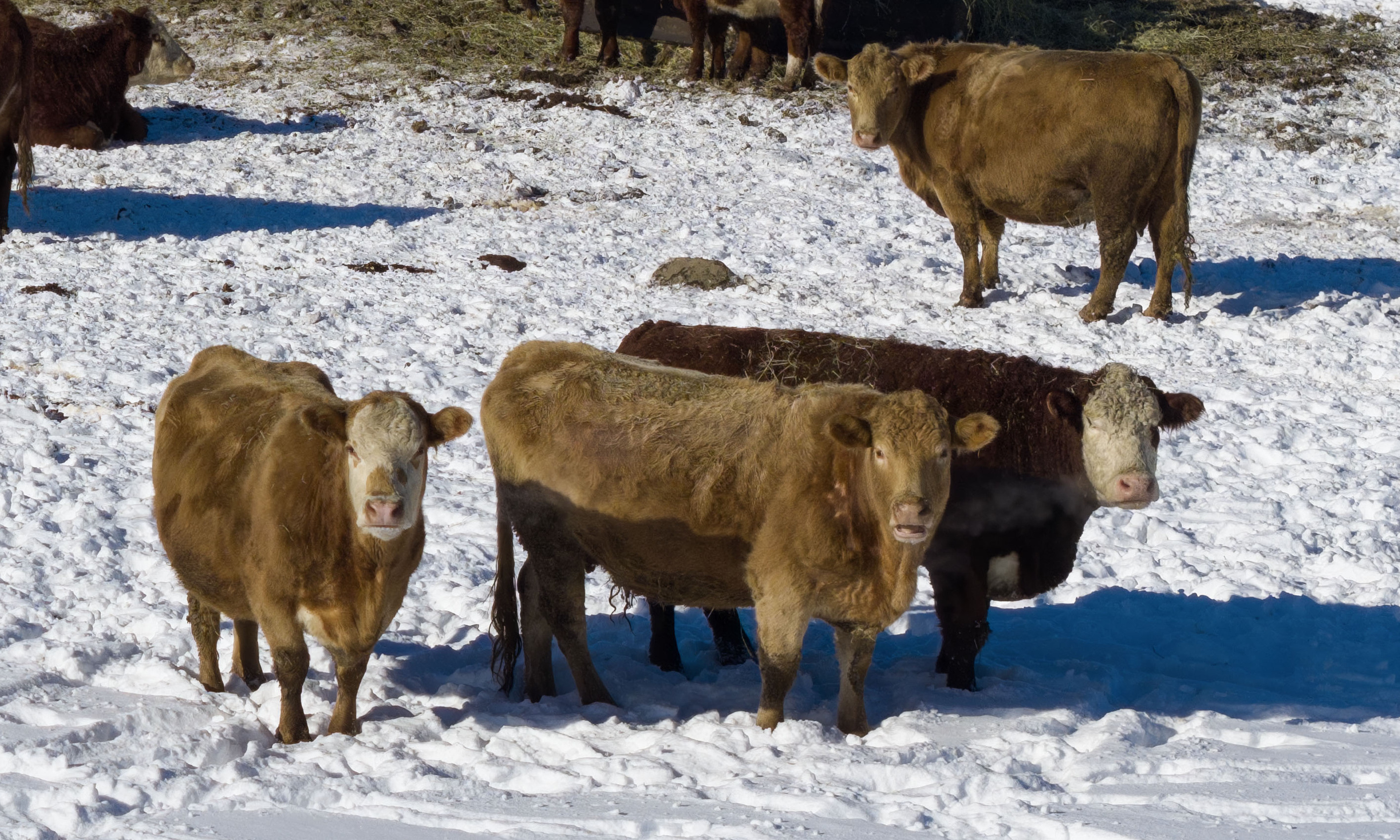
Hereford cattle are well adapted to cold climates.

Many strains of Hereford have used other cattle breeds to import desired characteristics, which has led to changes in the breed as a whole. However, some strains have been kept separate and retained characteristics of the earlier breed, such as hardiness and thriftiness. The Traditional Hereford is now treated as a minority breed of value for genetic conservation.

== Health ==
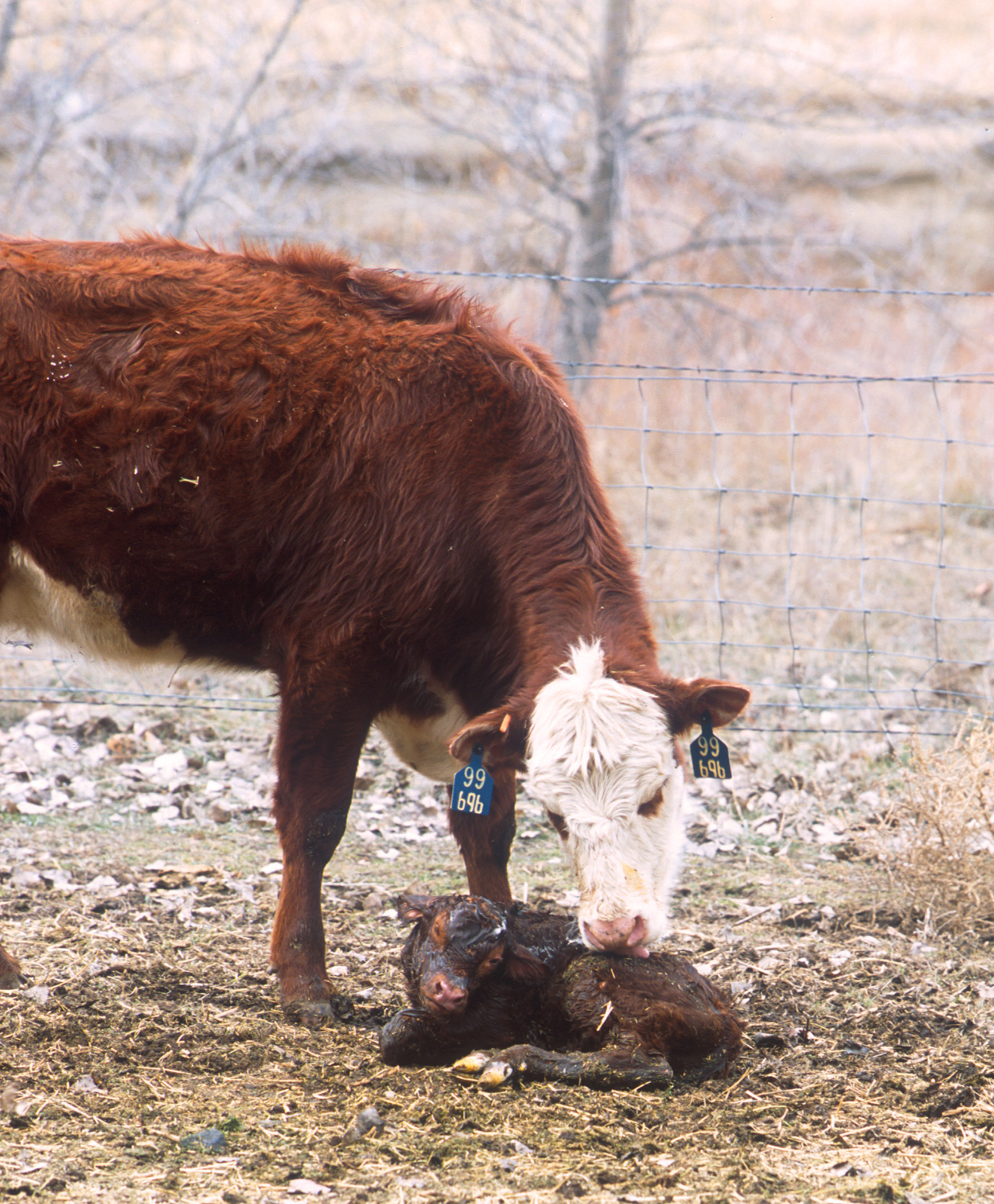
Cow with cross-bred calf

Eye cancer (ocular squamous cell carcinoma) occurs in Herefords, notably in countries with continued bright sunlight and among those that prefer traits of low levels of red pigmentation round the eye. Studies of eye cancer in Hereford cattle in the US and Canada showed lid and corneoscleral pigment to be heritable and likely to decrease the risk of cancer. Vaginal prolapse is considered a heritable problem, but may also be influenced by nutrition. Another problem is exposed skin on the udder being of light pigmentation and so vulnerable to sunburn.

Dwarfism is known to occur in Hereford cattle, caused by an autosomal recessive gene. Equal occurrence in heifers and bulls means that dwarfism is not considered a sex-linked characteristic.

== See also ==
- Hereford United F.C.
- Hereford pig
- Hereford, Texas
- List of cattle breeds
