= Procidentia =

Procidentia is a severe prolapse, the falling down of an organ from its normal anatomical position, usually referring to uterine prolapse.

== See also ==
- Uterine prolapse (and Female genital prolapse)
- Rectal prolapse
- Prolapse
