= List of All Creatures Great and Small (1978 TV series) episodes =

This is a list of all 90 television episodes from the first seven series of the British television series All Creatures Great and Small. Dates shown are original broadcast dates on BBC One.

The core quartet of characters—James Herriot, Siegfried Farnon, Tristan Farnon and Helen Herriot (née Alderson)—appear, unless otherwise stated. James and Siegfried are the only two characters to appear in every episode. Tristan appears in 65 episodes, Helen in 87. The final appearances of regular cast members are also noted.

== Episodes ==
=== Series 1 (1978) ===
Filmed in 1977, the opening credit sequence for the first three series feature Siegfried and James driving around the Dales and, at one point, sharing a laugh in the car. It is an excerpt from the Series 1 episode "Calf Love". The bridge they drive over is in Langthwaite. It is between there and Feetham that they splash their way through the ford.

Filming: July and August 1977. Recording: September–December 1977

No.	Title	Original release date
1	"Horse Sense"	8 January 1978
James Herriot, MRCVS, a newly qualified vet, arrives at Skeldale House for a job interview. It is the mid-1930s, and work is hard to come by. While James waits for Siegfried Farnon, his potential employer, he meets Mr Biggins for the first time. James has to earn his money even before securing employment. Siegfried takes James to see Mr White's lame horse and lets him both evaluate and treat it, before they venture on to Barrow Hills to see Bert Sharpe's cow, Violet, which makes its mark on James. After meeting a few locals in the pub, James is hired. James treats Phineas Calvert's cow, which has developed sunstroke, and decides - under the watch of the difficult Mr Soames - to euthanise Lord Hulton's valuable horse after he diagnoses that it is too far gone with an agonising torsion. Characters: Mrs Hall, Bert Sharpe, Diana Brompton, Mr Biggins, Mr White, Ted (barman), Soames, Phineas Calvert, Mrs Calvert.
2	"Dog Days"	15 January 1978
Siegfried settles James' nerves by confirming that he acted correctly with Lord Hulton's horse. James picks up Siegfried's brother Tristan from the station upon his return from veterinary college in Edinburgh, having failed pathology and parasitology. At first Siegfried sacks Tristan, but then decides to put him to work by collecting payments on market day. He misplaces the receipt book, however. James has his first encounter with Mrs Pumphrey and her pampered Pekingese pet dog, Tricki-Woo, who has developed "flop-bot". He calls again a few days later when another ailment is reported — this time "crackerdog". James visits Mr Dean and his 13-year-old dog, Bob, which has developed a cancerous growth in his abdomen. James decides it is best to put the animal down. Dean later gets a puppy and names it after his recent departure. Tristan plays a phone prank on James, pretending to be farmer Sims, of Beal Close. James exacts revenge by calling Tristan, pretending to be the farmer whose calf bed the duo put back in earlier in the day, saying the same thing has happened again. Characters: Arthur Handshaw, Tommy, Reynolds, Smedley, Hodgekin, Mrs Pumphrey, Mrs Hall, Mr Dean, Soames, Diana Brompton. Helen Alderson does not appear
3	"It Takes All Kinds"	22 January 1978
With paperwork becoming out of hand, Siegfried decides to employ a secretary, a Miss Winifred Harbottle. The result is not quite what he intended. On a call to her father's Heston Grange farm in Ellsdale to treat a calf with a fractured leg, James meets Helen Alderson for the first time since they were on the bus together. Miss Harbottle arrives. She is immediately put out by the slipshod administrative set-up at Skeldale House. She puts in place a change in their working methods, starting at 9.00 AM sharp the following morning. Miss Harbottle gets Mrs Hall's back up early on in their relationship by asking her not to touch any of her paperwork while she undertakes her duties. James coaxes Mrs Pumphrey into letting the vets look after Tricki-Woo at the surgery for a week so that they can give him the care he needs. Mrs Pumphrey finds it difficult to cope with the thought, while Hodgekin is beside himself with joy. Miss Harbottle starts to inflict her professionalism on the vets. Siegfried retaliates by regularly emptying out the petty cash box. Mrs Pumphrey sends James an expensive and elaborate gift basket. She also holds a "welcome home" party for Tricki-Woo. James attends an early-morning call and on his way back, and still in his pyjamas, he stops in to check on the Aldersons' calf. Siegfried takes Miss Harbottle to task about the fact that the cash box was empty when Siegfried needed to give change to two clients. Also, it is the tenth of the month and still the accounts have not gone out. The secretary storms out. Characters: Mrs Hall, Miss Harbottle, Mrs Pumphrey, Hodgekin, Francois (Mrs Pumphrey's butler), Dixon.
4	"Calf Love"	29 January 1978
Tristan uncovers James' interest in Helen when mentioning he saw her in Richard Edmundson's Bentley. James is called out late to Dan Cooper's cow, which is stuck in a bog. Tristan, meanwhile, stays out all night drinking with the bell ringers. In an attempt to sneak in, he is caught by Siegfried, who comes to the conclusion that his little brother has too much time to spare; as such, since Siegfried thinks he is "fast becoming a drunken, idle shirker," he puts Tristan in charge of his new piglets. James checks up on Tricki-Woo, who has a clean bill of health for once. Mrs Pumphrey reveals her new arrival: Nugent, a piglet. Siegfried reaches breaking point with Miss Harbottle. She presents him with paperwork to look over, which, much to her distress, he decides to tear up and throw the pieces over her head. At breakfast, Tristan reads out a piece of mail he has received: a letter of resignation from Miss Harbottle. Siegfried cannot contain his excitement. Albert Crump calls the surgery about his mare, which has Monday morning disease. Tristan dispatches James, but not before he lets on that he's been putting out delicate inquiries about Helen. She is, he reveals, a member of the Darrowby Music Society and every Tuesday attends their evenings in the village hall. He suggests James signs up too. At Mr Crump's, James samples some of his homemade wine. He gets sloshed, but then has to drop in on the teetotal Bamfords, who live at nearby Holly Bush Farm. James attends his first Music Society meeting and makes a point of assisting Helen with the washing up. He asks Helen out on a date on Saturday, and she accepts. Characters: Charlie Dent, Felicity (uncredited), Dan Cooper, Mrs Hall, Miss Harbottle, Mrs Seaton, Mrs Pumphrey, Richard Edmundson, Albert Crump, Mrs Crump.
5	"Out of Practice"	5 February 1978
Driving along the moor tops, James comes across a black Labrador stuck in the mud. He rescues it and decides to take it to Sister Louisa Rose to see if she can find it a home. James does not seem to be getting anywhere in his pursuit of Helen. Tristan convinces him take her to the ritzy Reniston hotel for dinner, but the date does not go well. To compound matters, Tristan suggests that he try seeing a different girl. He arranges a double date at a dance, with local girls Connie and Brenda, but things take a turn for the worse when Helen shows up with Richard Edmundson. James and Siegfried treat a pony of gypsy family the Myatts. Characters: Mrs Hall, Sister Louisa Rose, Mr Plenderleith, Mrs Plenderleith, Connie, Brenda, Jess Myatt, Mr Worley (barman), Richard Edmundson. The two pieces of gypsy music that are heard during James' visit to the Myatts are "Ditchling Beacon" and "English Pasture", by John Leach, part of a KPM series.
6	"Nothing Like Experience"	12 February 1978
Siegfried is under the cloud of a cold, leaving James to carry the burden of the visits. Helen brings her Border Collie, Dan, to the surgery. James is embarrassed by his performance when he saw her at the dance, but he finally manages to make a date with her. They go to the Darrowby Plaza with the intention of seeing a film about the Hebrides but it is changed without notice to a Western, Arizona Guns. James visits Isaac Cranford, who tries to coax James into fraudulently reporting that the farmer's cow died from a lightning strike instead of acute heart failure. Tristan decides to bring the legend of the Raynes Abbey ghost to life. It is Siegfried's turn to visit Cranford, this time to treat his boar. Before he leaves, Siegfried reminds Cranford about the state of his account. James gets a lift back to Darrowby from P.C. Blenkiron. En route, they see the "ghost" and promptly give chase. Back at Skeldale House, Tristan is forced to reveal himself. Tristan is asked to post a faeces sample to the laboratory and a bottle of ointment to Cranford. He mixes them up, which results in Cranford smearing an undesirable product into his boar's skin. To Siegfried's obvious glee, the mistake results in Cranford terminating their services. Characters: Isaac Cranford, Mrs Hall, Jeff Mallock, Mrs Dalby, Billy Dalby, William Dalby, Joe Kendall, Horace Dawson, P.C. Blenkiron, Gobber Newhouse, Arthur Handshaw, Charlie.
7	"Golden Lads and Girls"	19 February 1978
James drives by the funeral of Billy Dalby. After informing Siegfried of the news, he visits Mrs Dalby to pay his respect. The hard-of-hearing Joe Mulligan brings his "womiting" dog, Clancy, into the surgery. James is finally beginning to make real progress with Helen, who invites him to Sunday tea at the Aldersons', but ends up treating one of their cows that falls ill. The cow dies before James' treatment has a chance to work. After Siegfried buys a new Rover, James inherits his old one. When Tristan was up on a fell drinking Theakston's Nutty Brown Ale with James, he accidentally releases the handbrake. The pair watch as the car careens into the new shelter on the golf course. It is an incident that Siegfried just happens to read about in the morning paper. The duo's silence speaks volumes. Tristan blames the broken headlamp on an accident with a farm gate. With his car in being fixed, and James' brakes not up to standard, Tristan asks Siegfried if he can borrow his Rover to get to a call in Sorton. Tristan, of course, crashes it into a wall after swerving to avoid a flock of sheep in the road and has to break the news to his brother. Characters: Mr Alderson, Mrs Dalby, Gobber Newhouse, Mr Worley, Richard Edmundson, Joe Mulligan, P.C. Smith, Charlie, Aunt Lucy, Daphne, Lenny Butterfield, William Dalby.
8	"Advice & Consent"	26 February 1978
Tristan and Siegfried have to treat Mr Mulligan's giant dog, Clancy. However, they are all somewhat concerned over the sheer size of the animal. Siegfried, Tristan and Mrs Hall all give James some advice regarding Helen. James takes her to Bolton Castle, where he proposes to her. She accepts, and then James has to face the task of asking Mr Alderson for his permission to marry his daughter. Egged on by Tristan, Mr Biggins entertains the regulars at the Drovers. Mrs Dalby is worried about her cattle, and James struggles to find a diagnosis until he realises that the cows have rings around their eyes, as if they are wearing spectacles. Characters: Mrs Hall, Joe Mulligan, Mr Alderson, Mrs Dalby, Mr Biggins, Charlie, Bert, Aunt Lucy, Richard Edmundson.
9	"The Last Furlong"	5 March 1978
Siegfried is invited to the Brawton races. He knows the circuit is looking for a new vet, but his chances fade after meeting up with fellow vet Stewie Brannan whom he has not seen for several years. The Ministry of Agriculture requires the practice to undertake tuberculin testing the same week that James and Helen are on their honeymoon. James proposes a solution. James and Helen are married. Characters: Mrs Hall, Pickersgill, Olive Pickersgill, Sidlow, Stewie Brannan, Major General Ransom, Mrs Ransom, Colonel Tremayne, Mrs Tremayne, Head Lad.
10	"Sleeping Partners"	12 March 1978
James and Helen are on a working honeymoon, carrying out tuberculin testing. They are staying at Carperby's Wheatsheaf, an inn with an overly-doting landlady. Siegfried decides that it is time Tristan did some serious work for his examinations. James meets local vet Angus Grier and his student, Clinton. He invites James along on a call and provides him with a peculiar change of clothes. Siegfried hires student Richard Carmody while Tristan is away for exams. Characters: Mrs Hall, Angus Grier, Mrs Burns, Mrs Allen, Mr Allen, Clinton, Mrs Grier, Adderley, Tolly, Richard Carmody, Earnshaw, Smith.
11	"Bulldog Breed"	19 March 1978
A local smallholder, Frank Metcalfe, has spent all of his savings on new livestock. When the animals become seriously ill with brucellosis, the vets have their work cut out trying to save the day. Tristan returns from veterinary school in Edinburgh and confides in James that his exams may not have gone all that well. Tristan takes a dislike to Carmody and convinces James to let him see what real work feels like. The vets and the village doctor, who has set up practice next door to Skeldale, see an opportunity to teach Gobber Newhouse, a locally bully and wife-beater, a lesson when he steps on a rusty nail. Characters: Richard Carmody, Mrs Hall, Frank Metcalfe, Mary Metcalfe, Harry (Dr.) Allinson, Gobber Newhouse, Mrs Tilson, Mr Dent, Eli Bagley.
12	"Practice Makes Perfect"	7 April 1978
Tristan receives confirmation that he has failed his exams again. To butter Siegfried up, he begins a strict tee-total, smoke-free, healthy lifestyle, but confides the truth in James. James has to deal with Mrs Donovan, a self-educated animal healer whose dog is killed in an accident, and with Angus Grier, who has a broken arm. When Siegfried brings everyone together in the Skeldale living room to toast Tristan and his new way of life, Tristan has to come clean. It leaves Siegfried in a fit of rage. Characters: Mrs Hall, Angus Grier, Mrs Donovan, Mrs Mallard, Mr Bantock, Inspector Halliday, Nathaniel Adamson, Mrs Grier, Arthur Handshaw, Sam Broadbent, Connie, Betty.
13	"Breath of Life"	14 April 1978
Foot-and-mouth disease strikes in the Dales. As a precaution, Siegfried confines himself to Skeldale House. Dealing with a very sick ewe, James administers a large dose of anaesthetic. He expects the animal to quietly pass away, but is amazed to find that it makes a complete recovery. He repeats the treatment with Mrs Flaxton's pet poodle. Characters: Mrs Hall, Dowson, Bob Rigby, Kitson, Mrs Flaxton, Skipton, Betty.

=== Series 2 (1978) ===
Filming: March and April 1978. Recording: May–August 1978

No.	Title	Original release date
1	"Cats and Dogs"	23 September 1978
The practice is going through a very busy time. It is raining cats and dogs - literally! - when James comes face to face with Mrs Bond's cat, Boris, which James describes as a miniature puma. After initially scoffing at their colleague's story, the Farnons experience it for themselves. James agrees to care for Mr Dean's dog after he passes away. He also treats a farmer's newly acquired bull calf, but struggles to come up with a diagnosis and appropriate treatment. Siegfried wants James and Helen to move out of their cramped living quarters and into the suite at the top of the house. He is also growing tired of his brother's aptitude of pretending to look busy. Characters: Mrs Hall, Mr Bond, Mrs Bond, Harry Sumner, Mr Dean, Joe Mulligan. "In 'Cats and Dogs', Sonia Graham, who played Mrs Bond, had a wild cat up a tree; that was good stuff, I remember that vividly," recalled Robert Hardy in 2016. "I decided to sing an old song which I knew as I approached this cat, of whom Siegfried was terrified. I was singing this old country song under my breath: 'Oh what have you got for dinner Mrs Bond? There are geese in the orchard and ducks on the pond...' I remember it worked wonderfully well. Sonia was thrilled with that. It was just a lucky chance that her character was called Mrs Bond! And I remember that lovely location we were at. It was an old abbey. We went there again for another do with Mrs Bond — two or three times, I think."
2	"Attendant Problems"	30 September 1978
It is lambing time again in the Yorkshire Dales. Siegfried and Tristan treat Mr Benson's flock of sheep, several of which are suffering from a severe calcium deficiency. Others have become victims of a dog. Siegfried has to make a late-night call to Harold Ingledew, who is less than helpful after an evening of drinking at home. Much to Siegfried's chagrin, he repetitively sings "(You're My Heart's Desire, I Love You) Nellie Dean" and "Lily of Laguna". James is still confined to the surgery because of a sore ankle. He meets loner Roderick Perowne, a hatter who can't abide much; his dog, Sligo, has been injured. James also meets Peter Marston, whose dog, Jack, appears to have been caught up in some wrongdoings. Characters: Mr Benson, Mrs Hall, Roderick Perowne, Peter Marston, Mrs Marston, Harold Ingledew. The musical piece "Over the Hedgerows", by Johnny Pearson, is featured during the lambing sequence.
3	"Fair Means and Fowl"	7 October 1978
Tristan is faced with a lawsuit after treating Albert Skerry's bloated cow at the same time as Mr Skerry lights a match. Ewan Ross, a vet in nearby Scarburn, asks Siegfried for some help. Siegfried suggests James gives him a hand. Ross turns out to be a formidable character whose expertise in horses is tempered by his fondness of alcohol. Siegfried buys a flock of guinea fowl and charges Tristan with keeping them. After feeding them, however, someone forgets to close the gate. Characters: Mrs Hall, Ewan Ross, Virginia Ross, Marmaduke Skelton, Cornelius Skelton, Albert Skerry, Jess Hopgood, Tommy Thwaite, Colonel D'Arcy, Sammy Stubbs, Mr Sykes.
4	"The Beauty of the Beast"	14 October 1978
Siegfried treats a stallion belonging to Walt Barnett, a nasty and demanding client. James and Helen visit Jack Gilling's farm, where Helen spent a lot of time in her youth. She is saddened by the decline in the use of farm horses but is pleased to see Badger, the only remaining horse on the farm. When Badger falls ill, Mr Gilling has a tough decision to make. Characters: Mrs Hall, Cliff Tyreman, Walt Barnett, Jack Gilling, Tom, Freddy.
5	"Judgement Day"	21 October 1978
Mrs Bond pays a visit to the surgery with Boris. James is on the receiving end of the cat's claws. To Helen's dismay, James gets lumbered with the difficult job of being Duty Vet at the Darrowby and Houlton Show. At the show, Tristan tries to woo Beryl, a pretty barmaid in the beer tent, but finds out the hard way that she is spoken for. Mrs Hall enters her preserve in competition against the perennial victor. Characters: Mrs Hall, Mrs Bond, Mrs Pumphrey, Richard Edmundson, Mr Edmundson, Sr., Diana Brompton, Mr Griffiths, Mr Meeker, Mr Mallock, Arthur Handshaw, Hodgekin, Mr Smithers, Young Smithers, Mr Smethurst, Beryl.
6	"Faint Hearts"	28 October 1978
Helen, James, Tristan and Siegfried have lunch at a swank French restaurant, where Tristan meets Julia Taverner. Taken by her, he gets a chance to woo her when James is called out to treat her father's dog. Mrs Pumphrey visits the surgery and passes on some advice to Tristan in his pursuit of the object of his affection. James has to contend with the Bellerby family, of Haldon. He offers to give them a lift back to Darrowby to attend a performance of Handel's Messiah at the church, but the family's lunch appears interminable. James also has to treat Tim Alton's prize pig who has gone off her feed, the Taverners' dog, Dilly, and he faces a dilemma when Mrs Tompkins' budgerigar dies in his care. Characters: Mrs Hall, Dick Taverner, Beatrice Taverner, Julia Taverner, Mrs Pumphrey, Miss Stubbs, Mr Bellerby, Mrs Bellerby, Ruth Bellerby, Bob Bellerby, Tim Alton, Jennie Alton, Mrs Tompkins, Jacques, Mrs Broadwith, Jack Almond, Arthur Handshaw, George, Tom.
7	"Tricks of the Trade"	4 November 1978
Helen is away caring for her sick aunt. On his way across the moor tops, James finds a stray black kitten. He brings it to his next client, Mrs Butler, who names the kitten Moses and says she'll look after him. James and Tristan visit Mr Wilkinson's White Cross Farm to look at his "colt" Dancer, which turns out to be a six-year-old stallion. James meets Granville Bennett and ends up feeling the worse for wear. Siegfried has to follow up with Dancer, and is on the receiving end of the stallion's anger. Siegfried sets about collecting some outstanding debts, with his crosshair set firmly on Dennis Pratt. Characters: Mrs Hall, Granville Bennett, Dennis Pratt, Mrs Barker, Zoe Bennett, Mrs Butler, Mr Wilkinson, Mr Wellerby, Mr Dawson, Charlie Ormonroyd, Boy, First Nurse, Second Nurse, Fred. Helen Herriot does not appear
8	"Pride of Possession"	11 November 1978
James uses a hormone treatment on Roland Partridge's dog, Percy, with interesting results. His client's talent with a paint brush convinces James to arrange for his next subject to be Bill Ogilvie's prize bull. Ogilvie, however, loses faith when his bull appears to be uninterested in performing his duties. He is proved wrong. James visits Birch Tree Farm to see Charlie Rudd's new cow, Strawberry, with amusing results. Tristan treats Angela Farmer's dog, but he accidentally injects her instead of the patient. Characters: Mrs Hall, Roland Partridge, Angela Farmer, Bill Ogilvie, Charlie Rudd, Maurice Rudd.
9	"The Name of the Game"	18 November 1978
The annual cricket match between Rainby and Hedwick is a fixture that Siegfried and Tristan have learned to avoid. This year, it is James who gets conned into playing. James treats the Dimmocks' new puppy with all of the children in close attendance. He decides to call in Granville Bennett to assist, but is worried that he will only get into trouble, so he asks Siegfried to come along as well. Granville persuades both of them to stop in at his "branch surgery," with predictable results. Characters: Mrs Hall, Granville Bennett, Zoe Bennett, Mr Blenkinsopp, Mr Dimmock, Mrs Dimmock, Mrs Pounder, Betty, Tom Willis, Tagger Hird, Hodgekin, Len, Nellie, Fred. Guest appearances: Ken Hastwell (as umpire), Philip Whileman (as Sam).
10	"Puppy Love"	25 November 1978
James and Tristan drive through the night back from a conference in London. Tristan displays his lack of sleep by driving the car through the back of the garage. Alice McTavish visits Skeldale House from Edinburgh with "wee Tristan". James treats the Barratts' sick dog. The couple are having marital problems to boot. Characters: Mrs Hall, George Barratt, Mrs Barratt, Alice McTavish, Mr Wiggins, Wilf, Constable.
11	"Ways and Means"	2 December 1978
Alice visits again following the death of her father. She joins Tristan on a call to treat a choking nanny goat, which has eaten something unusual. Always nervous speaking at public events, James has to make a speech to the Darrowby Youth Club. Characters: Mrs Hall, Mr Biggins, Mrs Bond, Alice McTavish, Muriel Dunn, Matilda Dunn, Mr Blenkinsopp, Mr Kirby, Harold Denham, Agnes, Betty.
12	"Pups, Pigs and Pickle"	9 December 1978
The vets must deal with Kit Bilton, a friendly farmer who grows too attached to the beasts. Siegfried falls foul of the law due to an expired tax disc. James treats the pet of a cantankerous lady. After an early-morning job, Farmer Horner invites James to stay for breakfast. James is horrified when the farmer's mother serves him a large helping of bacon which consists almost entirely of fat. Helen is away visiting her sick Aunt Lucy, so Tristan tries to coax James into going on a pub crawl. Siegfried gets on rather well with Tristan's friend Daphne. Characters: Mrs Hall, Miss Dooley, Mr Horner, Mrs Horner, Daphne, Kit Bilton, P.C. Leach. Guest appearance: Norah Fulton (as Mrs Horner), Gorden Kaye (as Kit Bilton) Helen Herriot does not appear
13	"A Dog's Life"	16 December 1978
James has to deal with a difficult calving. He has an audience which includes the farmer's brother, who provides a non-stop critique of James' performance. Helen returns to Darrowby after the funeral of her aunt, but when she and James try to spend some time together, the inevitable phone calls come in. Characters: Mrs Hall, Mr Dinsdale (I), Mrs Hammond, Mr Beckwith, Mrs Allenby, Joe Kendall, Major Bullen, Mr Dinsdale (II), Mr Fairburn, Mavis, David Blundell.
14	"Merry Gentlemen"	24 December 1978
Mrs Pumphrey often gave the vets Fortnum & Mason products Christmastime at Skeldale House proves to be pretty much the same as most other days as far as work is concerned. James, Siegfried and Tristan all treat a gypsy family's ailing donkey. Siegfried gets to rate Mrs Hewison's Christmas cake, which is regarded as the best in the district. Only, she has a surprise for him this year. When Tricki-Woo falls ill, Siegfried decides that the dog should spend a few days at Skeldale House. Siegfried mysteriously keeps the spare front room locked, only to arrange a surprise for Tristan after Helen piques his brother's curiosity. James, Helen, Siegfried, Tristan and Mrs Hall depart for a Christmas service at church as the snow begins to fall. Characters: Mrs Hall, Mrs Pumphrey, Mr Gilling, Jess Myatt, Mr Hewison, Mrs Hewison, Mr Mallock. Uncredited: Margie Myatt. During the closing credits, footage is shown of the empty Skeldale kitchen; Christmas presents under the tree in the dining room; and Mrs Pumphrey hanging a stocking of toys on Tricki-Woo's bed.

=== Series 3 (1979–80) ===
Filming: March–May 1979. Recording: June–October 1979

No.	Title	Original release date
1	"Plenty to Grouse About"	25 December 1979
James deals with tuberculin testing. He is summoned to the Min of Ag by Charles Harcourt when the test results cause confusion. Siegfried has to deal with Murray, a dog owner who only believes in the strictest of discipline for his charge. He also has to deal with dying sheep on the grouse moors, a result of louping ill. Helen gets a job as a secretary, but James is not sure he approves. Siegfried, meanwhile, thinks it is a wonderful idea; Tristan less so, when he realises he will have to pick up the administrative slack in the partnership. Mrs Hall tells Siegfried she has to leave to help her brother, who is now working his farm alone. Characters: Mrs Hall, Murray, Charles Harcourt, Jeff Mallock, Moverley, Hill, Mrs Noakes, George, Kitty Pattison, Mrs Murray.
2	"Charity Begins at Home"	5 January 1980
Siegfried runs into Ronald Beresford, the manager of the local bank, whose dog behaves badly in the car. Tristan woos Marjorie Simpson, and Siegfried meets Sarah Raworth. James treats Mr Bailey's dog, which has developed a case of bronchitis. Siegfried chastises James after he waives the veterinary fee. Siegfried proves, once again, that he has problems heeding his own advice. Tristan rescues a severely injured cat and convinces James to try to save him rather than put him down. With surgery a success, Helen decides to adopt the socially-inclined feline and nurses him back to full health. She is later distraught when she learns that the cat belongs to the Gibbons family. Characters: Mrs Hall, Ronald Beresford, Marjorie Simpson, Mr Bailey, Sarah Raworth, Ted Dobson, Albert Close, Sepp Gibbons.
3	"Every Dog Has His Day..."	12 January 1980
Mr Biggins tells James about his cowhand, Ned Finch, who goes drinking every night and is drawn to the bright lights of "big city" Briston. All James sees, however, is an amiable worker having a quiet drink in his local. Mrs Hall is all aflutter after a visit from Mr Barge, the practice's pharmaceutical rep from Messrs Cargill and Sons. James has to treat Mrs Pumphrey's new boxer, Cedric, which has a case of flatulence. Characters: Mrs Hall, Mrs Pumphrey, Mr Barge, Mr Biggins, Ned Finch, Mr Dent, Mr Dent Sr., Con Fenton, Hodgekin, Hilda Biggins, David Woodley, Mr Beresford, Mrs Beresford, Marion, Mrs Cartwright, Colonel Buller, Curate, Mrs Tamworth-Brown. Uncredited: Miss Bedford, Mrs Pumphrey's maid.
4	"Hair of the Dog"	19 January 1980
Tristan and Siegfried meet a tramp named Roddy Travers and his dog who are passing through the area. Mrs Hall has gone to Brawton to visit her sister, Dorothy, whose husband is sick and has been told he cannot return to work. Tristan reluctantly agrees to take over the household chores and duties in her absence. Siegfried is less than sympathetic when his brother starts to complain. Granville Bennett stops in, hoping for someone to take a look at his dog, Phoebe, who needs a minor operation. He invites James and Siegfried to lunch the next day. The former over-imbibes yet again. Characters: Mrs Hall, Roddy Travers, Granville Bennett, Zoe Bennett, Mr Willis.
5	"If Wishes Were Horses"	26 January 1980
Tristan has a late night, which leads to his brother taking him to task about his bad habits. A young delinquent, Wesley Binks, is persuaded to change his ways when his dog gets distemper. Tristan has designs on young Deborah Mount, but her father does not approve. The Weeting brothers, Brian and Dennis, leave town to enlist in the military. Characters: Mrs Hall, Mr Mount, Mr Scargill, Deborah Mount, Wesley Binks, Mrs Binks, Mr Jenkins, Mr Weeting, Brian Weeting, Dennis Weeting. "Robert Hardy did such lovely things with his performance," remembered Paul Clayton, who played Brian Weeting. "I can remember him giving us that look after we tell him that we are off to war. He had a line, but he chose not to say anything. He just paused. What I learned from him was he always used this pause, which gave his scenes breathing space, which in turn gave the editors choice on which character is telling the story at that moment." "In 'If Wishes Were Horses' I had to make it look like that car was driving itself, which was quite a difficult thing to do, driving down the hill, looking at the rooftops of the houses," recalled Peter Davison. "That was a good gag — as was the Health and Efficiency gag. I used to love that one. From my childhood it was like, 'Wow... nudists!' So when one turned up on the set in an earlier episode, I thought, 'I've got to have Tristan reading this.' I liked putting in the gags; I just loved the idea that he was smoking fags in the surgery next to a 'No Smoking' sign. I put in one great gag where I put the cigarette in the desk and I shut the drawer and then smoke started coming out! I just had fun with that aspect of him, and this character gave me licence to do all those things. We all had great confidence by this point and we just loved doing it."
6	"Pig in the Middle"	2 February 1980
It is James and Helen's anniversary and he's planning a special celebration. The evening, at the highbrow Harlequin restaurant in Bickershaw, is nearly ruined when a goat eats his cheque book. Siegfried starts dating Margery Egerton. Tristan, meanwhile, thwarted in his attempts to see Deborah Mount, turns his attention to previous conquests. James has to pay several visits to Mr Bailes, whose dog has an affinity for scaring the wits out of visitors. Mrs Hall over-imbibes at the Women's Union sherry party. Characters: Mrs Hall, Mrs Egerton, Mr Bailes, Mrs Ainsworth, Mr Biggins.
7	"Be Prepared"	9 February 1980
War is becoming a distinct possibility, so Helen stocks up on food, while Tristan, at the request of his brother, puts tape on the windows in an attempt to minimise the chance of them shattering if the bombs arrive. Siegfried decides that Skeldale House should conserve its food supply by having its occupants eat together. Mrs Hall takes his instructions to economise a bit too seriously. James treats Miss Westerman's dog, Hamish. During the dog's recovery, however, Tristan manages to lose it. Siegfried tries to pair his brother up with the dour Deirdre Headingley, but he manages to wriggle his way out of it. The vets forego a soiree with the Headingleys in order to treat a stray dog that has been in an accident. Characters: Mrs Hall, P.C. Blenkiron, Miss Westerman, Mr Stokill, Major Headingley, Deirdre Headingley, Lydia.
8	"A Dying Breed"	16 February 1980
James and Siegfried get to see a modern milking parlour when they attend a calving. There are problems when the milkman's horse has to be taken off the road for treatment. Miss Westerman returns with Hamish. Tristan tries to avoid her, given that he misplaced the dog last time he was put in his care. She is concerned about the rumours that dogs will need to be euthanised in the event of war, but Tristan puts her mind at ease. The vets agree to spay a cat for a minimum fee, thanks to Tristan, but find they may have been taken advantage of. Siegfried treats Herbie Hinchcliffe's aging horse, Dolly, and becomes emotionally involved in the case when it comes to putting her down. Characters: Mrs Hall, Herbie Hinchcliffe, Mr Blackburn, Mrs Beck, Miss Westerman, Mrs Bravington. "In 'A Dying Breed' we corpsed a lot," remembered Carol Drinkwater. "We laughed out loud when Peter had to come into the breakfast room and tell us all that a horse had to be put down. Every time Peter came in from the telephone to say, 'He's had Dolly put down' we all burst out laughing. I don't know why. It must have been something to do with the way Peter delivered the line the first time and we all laughed, and Peter went, 'What?' The director asked why we were laughing and we couldn't say because we didn't know. Any time we tried to do this scene, we burst out laughing every time Peter came into the room, even before he talked about this sick animal."
9	"Brink of Disaster"	23 February 1980
After his recent experience with Dolly, Siegfried has become somewhat shy around horses. James has to deal with the unfriendly Ralph Beamish, an arrogant horse owner who continually ignores his advice. The vets have to deal with an outbreak of Foot and Mouth Disease on Duggleby's farm. War is declared. Characters: Mrs Hall, Ralph Beamish, Duggleby, Mrs Beck, Mrs Bailey, Mr Bailey. "When you think we made ninety episodes, I have very few actual recollections of scenes that I played," recalled Robert Hardy. "Though one of my favourite ones — because it was so true, I think — was my scene with Peter when war is declared, and we were sat at the top of a ridge, looking around at this wonderful Yorkshire countryside." Assistant floor manager David Tilley remembered: "The racing stables featured in "Brink of Disaster" were at Middleham, where Jumbo Wilkinson was the trainer. I remember them being pleased with their young apprenticed rider who had won his first race the day before we filmed. Because there was so much filming for this episode and "Matters of Life and Death", the studio recordings for both episodes was combined into the same two-day slot at Pebble Mill."
10	"Home and Away"	1 March 1980
With Mrs Hall away visiting a cousin, Tristan tries his hand at doing the cooking again. Siegfried, however, wishes he had not bothered. James fills in for Stewie Brannan while he's on holiday. He and Helen visit the dog track when he has to act as Duty Vet. The vets have to deal with a dog that has been hit by a car. Characters: Mrs Hall, Mrs Holroyd, Peter Gillard, Marjorie Gillard, Mr Pymm, Mr Coker, Horace.
11	"Alarms and Excursions"	8 March 1980
There is an outbreak of unexplained dog poisonings in the Darrowby area. Siegfried decides to investigate. Tristan has a farewell evening out with the local bell ringers. James and Tristan go to the bell tower. As can be expected, things do not go smoothly. Siegfried treats Joan Clifford's dog, Saxon, but the case has specific implications for her. James, meanwhile, treats the inexplicably-loud Len Hamson's pigs. Characters: Mrs Hall, Joan Clifford, Rob Benson, Len Hamson, Elijah Hamson, Nathaniel Adamson, Bert Bartle, George. Helen Herriot does not appear
12	"Matters of Life and Death"	15 March 1980
James visits Lord Hulton's stately home. Hulton has taken a liking to a horse that has wandered onto his property from the nearby military barracks. At the Billings' farm, James finds young calves who are emaciated. He thinks they have ingested an irritant of some kind, but the vets cannot isolate the source. Mrs Hall selects one of Siegfried's finest wines — a 1928 Château Haut-Brion — for the Herriots to enjoy on their evening alone. Siegfried begrudgingly agrees to the pairing, even though it means he's missing out on one of Mrs Hall's steak and kidney puddings. James fails to save a dog belonging to Paul Cotterell. He's devastated to hear that Cotterell committed suicide upon losing his canine companion. Characters: Mrs Hall, Lord Hulton, Paul Cotterell, Ken Billings, Seth Pilling, Mrs Pilling, Trooper Raven, Stokill, Charlie.
13	"Will to Live"	22 March 1980
Siegfried takes Tristan to task for not mending a hole in the fence. Tristan, in response, announces that he is going to make a stand against the tyranny. Tristan tries to get James on his side, but James will not get involved, until his hand is forced. James operates on a sick calf, but those assisting him are worse off than the animal. James also has to tell a neurotic dog-owner that his pet is going blind. In Margery Egerton, Siegfried is having woman trouble. Characters: Mrs Hall, Andrew Vine, Margery Egerton, Mr Sowden, Mr Abbott, George Hindley, Alice Temple. Sandy Byrne, wife of writer Johnny: "I'll tell you a funny story about Mr Sowden's farm in "Will to Live". The location was picked because it was filthy and the real farmer was delighted they were going to film on his farm, but when the unit arrived, he had scrubbed it spotless, so the crew had to pump all this shit back into make it filthy again. I remember Christopher Timothy stood on the side of a hill with a plastic rain hat on, because they needed to keep his hair dry for continuity."
14	"Big Steps and Little 'Uns"	5 April 1980
Mrs Hall gets a proposal of marriage from Harold Carter. With his time at home with Helen at a premium, James is frustrated at the number of call-outs he has to deal with. Tristan takes up the slack so that James can spend the night with Helen. Tristan gets word that he has finally passed his veterinary exams and, thus, has joined the ranks of MRCVS. James and Siegfried enlist in the RAF and leave Darrowby for the duration. Siegfried leaves first, with James following a little while later, on Easter Monday. In her final scene, Mrs Hall sees James off from Skeldale House. On his way out of town in a taxi, several locals bid their farewells to the vet. Characters: Mrs Hall (final appearance), Harold Carter, Arnold Summergill, Dr. Raczinska, Emma Tanner, Wilf Henderson, Miss Thompson, Simon Tanner, Fred, Suzie Clark. "The last episode of the third series, while maybe less amusing than others, contained some of my favourite scenes," recalled Peter Davison. "The final shot was James driving away from Darrowby, and the first two people he waves to are Olive and Charles Turner, the owners of Cringley (Skeldale) House, which they had recently sold to be turned into an old people's home." The only known outtake released from the series occurred when Siegfried gets up from the living room desk to answer the phone call from Simon Tanner. Peter Davison bursts through the door in a superhero outfit and exclaims, "Bill Sellars on the phone, Siegfried. Wondering if we'll do a fourth series?" Christopher Timothy drops down onto the armchair behind the door and adds, "Holy television producer, Siegfried! What should we do?" "Well, look here, superchaps, I'll tell you what. Fourth series, eh? I'll talk to him on the phone and while I'm doing that, you attack from behind," concludes Robert Hardy.

=== 1980s Christmas Specials ===
No.	Title	Original release date
1	"Christmas Special 1983"	25 December 1983
The war finally over, James returns to Darrowby to rejoin his partners in veterinary practice. He is having trouble readjusting to civilian life, however. His first call, of course, is to Mr Biggins, who has not changed and does nothing but complain. Relations are also strained with Helen: James is short-tempered and cannot open up to her. A new housekeeper, Mrs Hubbard, is hired to replace the late Mrs Hall. Her culinary skills prove to be severely lacking compared to her predecessor's. Tristan, older but not necessarily wiser, is back with the Darrowby bell ringers. Siegfried meets an old flame, Caroline, who has returned after living in America. They later marry and have children, as mentioned in the series 7 episode "Hampered". Characters: Mr Biggins, Mrs Pumphrey, Mr Alderson, Hodgekin, Mrs Hubbard, Mr Hammond, Mr Mason, George Mason, Caroline Fisher, Anne Grantley, P.C. Goole, Inspector Green, Sergeant Bannister, Mr Garrett, Vera, Harry, Jimmy Herriot.
2	"Christmas Special 1985: The Lord God Made Them All"	25 December 1985
James comes to the aid of Sister Rose when she finds a dog stuck in a peat bog. He takes a liking to the animal and takes it home. Helen disapproves and thinks he's raising the children's hopes about its condition. Tristan is now working for the Ministry of Agriculture. He's also reconnected with Debbie Mount and, in turn, her abstemious father. Siegfried, now sporting a moustache, treats a cat that has taken up residence in Walt Barnett's scrapyard. Someone is clearly abusing the animal, but the irascible Barnett seems to have developed a soft spot for it. James and Tristan are on the receiving end of Mr Ripley's patchwork gate. With their wedding anniversary soon upon them, Helen is after James to get a haircut, but he's afraid of the rough and tumble barber. Characters: Jimmy Herriot, Rosie Herriot, Sister Rose, Mr Mount, Fu Manchu, Mrs Greenlaw, Debbie Mount, Mr Ripley, Clem Hudson, Dick Hudson, Herbert Hudson, George Forsyth, Walt Barnett, Josh Anderson, Sidney, Fred, Mr Edgeworth.

=== Series 4 (1988) ===
After an eight-year break, the opening credits get a makeover from the last series. Whereas previously it was only Siegfried and James featured, now each central character that appears in the episode receives an isolated shot (taken directly from the episode) with their textual introduction. The opening credits for Series 5 are the same. Lynda Bellingham now joins the cast as Helen.

No.	Title	Original release date
1	"One of Nature's Little Miracles"	17 January 1988
Siegfried decides the time has come to hire a full-time assistant, and Calum Buchanan, with whom Tristan attended veterinary school in Edinburgh, fits the bill. Tristan is now a full-time employee of the Ministry of Agriculture, where he sets his eyes on Deirdre McEwan. James tries to get a bank loan, joins the Milk Sub-Committee and pays a visit to Tricki-Woo. Another vet, Hilary Mottram, claims that Siegfried is stealing his clients. Characters: Calum Buchanan (first appearance), Mrs Pumphrey, Hilary Mottram, Hodgekin, Mrs Greenlaw, Jimmy Herriot, Rosie Herriot, Deirdre McEwan, Bert Kealey, Mrs Kealey, Mr Buckle, Billy Buckle, Mr Ripley, Mr Fellowes, Mr Lumsden, Mr Carter, Mr Gregson, Sir William Massingham.
2	"Barks And Bites"	24 January 1988
Tristan is named the Min of Ag's "Fertility Adviser for the North Riding of Yorkshire". He's responsible for promoting the use of artificial insemination to some skeptical farmers. James shops for a new radiogram, but is reluctant to let anyone else use it. Rosie joins her father on his rounds, but nearly has a serious accident with a bull. Siegfried treats the Whithorns' pair of spoiled dogs. James enlists Tristan's help to check some sheep that are being exported to the Soviet Union. Calum takes up residence at Skeldale. Characters: Calum Buchanan, Mrs Greenlaw, Jimmy Herriot, Rosie Herriot, Dobbs, Mr Whithorn, Mrs Whithorn, Mr Hawley, Mr Dibble, Mr Pinkerton, Mr Casling, Mr Binns, Mr Crawford, Ludmilla Pavlechenko, Captain Polenov, Mr Berryman (radiogram salesman).
3	"The Bull with the Bowler Hat"	31 January 1988
Tristan begins work as a Fertility Advisor. He conducts an informal seminar in the beer garden of the Drovers. At a dead end with Deirdre, Tristan accepts Calum's suggestion that he invite her to dinner, for which Calum will prepare his speciality: roast duck. As it turns out, the two Scots discover they have a lot more in common. James tries unsuccessfully to save Tom Maxwell's sick cow and is concerned that the farmer will take legal action against him. He also has to treat Humphrey Cobb's pregnant dog, but discovers that it is the owner who needs more attention. Siegfried thinks that Calum is introducing too much wildlife into Skeldale House. Characters: Calum Buchanan, Deirdre McEwan, Mrs Greenlaw, Jimmy Herriot, Rosie Herriot, Mr Hartley, Tom Maxwell, Mr Dakin, Humphrey Cobb, Jeff Mallock, Mr Dodson, Harold Sweetman, Myra Sweetman, Major Bullivant (uncredited).
4	"The Pig Man Cometh"	7 February 1988
Siegfried deals with two brothers, Rupe and Will, who are constantly bickering. He also treats the wealthy Seth Bootland's sick horse and receives an interesting proposition. Lionel Brough decides to buy a pig farm, but runs into problems when his stock falls ill with what James suspects is swine fever. When Tristan finds himself on the end of Mr Stott's practical joke, he decides to exact revenge. Tristan is almost ready to admit defeat in the fight for Deirdre's heart after Calum is chosen to look after her Dobermans. When Mrs Dryden lets slip that she is selling her house, James sets his sights on buying it at auction. Characters: Calum Buchanan, Mrs Greenlaw, Lionel Brough, Mr Hawley, Mrs Dryden, Seth Bootland, Malcolm Bootland, Rupe, Will, Mr Gregson, Mr Stott, Mr Teasdale, Jeff Mallock, Mr Hartley, Mr Bradbury.
5	"Hail Caesar!"	14 February 1988
Siegfried takes Tristan to task when the bus Little Brother was travelling on hits and kills one of Lord Brawton's stags. Soon after, venison mysteriously becomes available on the market. Tristan and Calum are still vying for Deirdre's affection, but the former seems to be making slow progress, despite his attempts to appreciate all things Scottish. The vets have to deal with an outbreak of fleas and are busy preparing for a bank holiday event intended to raise money for a new church roof. James tries to perform a caesarean section on a cow. Mrs Westby's dog is suffering from a severe bout of pneumonia. Calum provides the solution. Characters: Calum Buchanan, Mrs Pumphrey, Deirdre McEwan, Jimmy Herriot, Rosie Herriot, Mrs Greenlaw (final appearance), Hodgekin, Harry Cropper, Lord Brawton, Lady Brawton, Mrs Westby, Sarah Westby, Jane Westby, Mr Bushell, Mr Boddy.
6	"Only One Woof"	21 February 1988
Siegfried deals with a sheepdog who never barks. James has problems with miserly Mr Biggins, who blames the vet for the death of his cow. Calum is on the receiving end of another of Siegfried's rants. This time it is telling clients that they can call at any hour of the day or night. Tristan becomes an overnight expert on goats in an effort to impress Jean Derrick, a beautiful young married woman who Tristan thinks has an elderly husband. Helen takes a liking to a stray cat and its kitten when they wander into the garden. Characters: Calum Buchanan, Seb Wilkin, Mr Biggins, Deirdre McEwan, Duke of Mannerton, Mollie Minikin, Jean Derrick, Bob Derrick, Jimmy Herriot, Rosie Herriot, Winston Mallock, Mr Thwaites, Jim Crossley
7	"Ace, King, Queen, Jack"	28 February 1988
James deals with a sick cow, an injured dog, and a box full of kittens. He is also annoyed at Siegfried, who has purchased a second car while he has to deal with an aging vehicle. James is also asked to judge the dog competition at the Darrowby Show. Mrs Pumphrey subsequently informs him that she plans to enter Tricki-Woo. Siegfried visits a farmer who has installed a modern milking parlour. He's dismayed, however, when he investigates a suspected case of Foot and Mouth disease. Calum is puzzled by Herman, a sick dachshund that has developed difficulty walking. Characters: Calum Buchanan, Mrs Pumphrey, Jack Scott, Tony Scott, Sheila Scott, Gordon Unwin, Cyril, Ron Cundall, Mrs Cundall, Mrs Herron, Rachael Bosworth, Jimmy Herriot, Rosie Herriot, Brigadier D'Arcy.
8	"The Healing Touch"	6 March 1988
Siegfried hauls Calum over the coals about his wasting medical supplies. Calum is tickled when Siegfried, once more, fails to take his own medicine. He also treats a flock of sick turkeys whose owner is convinced that the vets are out to cheat him of his hard-earned money. James has to treat a cat with a shattered jaw. He calls on Granville Bennett to help. Granville offers him a share of his practice. Tristan is having trouble keeping pace with his tennis-playing sweetheart, Rachael Bosworth. Characters: Calum Buchanan, Granville Bennett, Zoe Bennett, Susan Vaughan, Colonel (Charlie) Bosworth, Rachael Bosworth, Phineas Calvert, Jimmy Herriot, Rosie Herriot, Mr Dugdale, Mr Boggs, Lord Hawden, Deirdre McEwan.
9	"City Slicker"	13 March 1988
James is still thinking over Granville Bennett's offer of a share in his practice. An old school friend, Andrew Bruce, who is thinking about taking up farming, pays a visit. James and Siegfried give him a lesson in the realities of a farmer's life. Siegfried visits Mr Dumbleby, a demanding farmer who rarely pays his bills. Characters: Calum Buchanan, Andrew Bruce, Mr Pickersgill, Mr Dumbleby, Walter Hugill, Thomas Hugill, Fenwick Hugill, William Hugill, Terry Watson, Mrs Watson, Jimmy Herriot, Rosie Herriot, Albert Kenning, Henry Dickson, Dick Dunning, Gordon Unwin, Cyril, Mr Atkinson.
10	"For Richer, For Poorer"	20 March 1988
James and Helen are proud parents when Jimmy is asked to play in his piano teacher's music recital. James becomes fed up when his car breaks down. It may convince him to accept the partnership offer from Granville Bennett. The time has come again for Kit Bilton to slaughter his pig. As usual, he has grown so attached to the beast that he cannot bear to see it die. Siegfried has a bad day, thanks in large part to the Hardwicke family. Calum gets trapped in a tree by a bull, so he misses Deirdre's arrival at Mannerton. Characters: Calum Buchanan, Deirdre McEwan, Jimmy Herriot, Rosie Herriot, Arthur Hardwicke, Ben Hardwicke, Colonel (Charlie) Bosworth, Phineas Calvert, Kit Bilton, Mrs Bilton, Mr Buckle, Billy Buckle, Mrs Wheatley, Hubert Merrick, Miss Livingstone, David.

=== Series 5 (1988) ===
No.	Title	Original release date
1	"Against the Odds"	3 September 1988
Helen is bedridden with a slipped disc. Tristan has left his job at the Ministry of Agriculture and wants to join the practice. Siegfried and James string him along. The younger Farnon also tries to dupe Calum into partaking in a double date, with the latter having to partner up with Prudence Barraclough. The Dales are several feet deep in snow, so James takes to his skis in an attempt to reach the Maxwells. Calum has to go off to do some tuberculin testing in Ireland. Characters: Calum Buchanan, Mrs Pumphrey, Tom Maxwell, Tess Maxwell, Verity Barraclough, Geoffrey Barraclough, Hodgekin, Edna, Clayton, Downs, Prudence Barraclough. The Herriots' new dog is seen for the first time. It is a black Labrador Retriever named Dan (after the Aldersons' old Border Collie)
2	"Place of Honour"	10 September 1988
James visits the Trenholms, whose dog, Tip, chooses to sleep outside in a barrel in all weathers. Meanwhile, one of their cows has suffered a vaginal hemorrhage. Tristan, woken from a slumber by Mr Busby, puts off his visit in favour of returning to bed, a move that frustrates both the client and James, who has to take Busby's irate phone call while caring for his incapacitated wife. A delivery courtesy of Mrs Pumphrey, while meant specifically for Helen, pleases all at Skeldale House. Mrs Pumphrey holds a black tie birthday party for Tricki-Woo, with James as the guest of honour. Tristan ducks out for a swift lunchtime pint at the Drovers, only to be disturbed by a call from Helen. Busby has been on the phone again. Irked at having his session cut short, Tristan exacts some revenge on Busby. Characters: Peter Trenholm, Mary Trenholm, Mr Busby, George (postman) (uncredited), Mrs Pumphrey, Hodgekin, Edna, Jimmy Herriot, Rosie Herriot, The Bourbon Ensemble. Calum Buchanan does not appear, having left for Ireland during the previous episode
3	"Choose a Bright Morning"	17 September 1988
Calum returns from Ireland and is excited to hear that Deirdre will be spending a week in Darrowby. Siegfried treats Sir Robert's horse after it suffers a fall in the care of Kate Ingram. James is introduced to a family of cat-lovers. Tristan treats a dog who takes pleasure in biting him. Siegfried tells Tristan that he'll have to do the next round of tuberculin testing in Ireland. Characters: Calum Buchanan, Deirdre McEwan, Sir Robert, Kate Ingram, Mrs Hird, Ruth Bramley, Mrs Butterworth, Wendy Butterworth, Tom Mariner.
4	"The Playing Field"	24 September 1988
Helen is still laid up with a slipped disc. With Siegfried in London at a conference, James' friend Andrew Bruce comes to stay again. James has to deal with Jack Scott's horse and Mr Wiggins' bullocks. Calum takes delight in tormenting a straight-shooting farmer. Ireland-bound Tristan tests everyone's patience with his limited culinary skills. James panics when he realises he has not got Helen an anniversary gift. Andrew saves the day. Characters: Calum Buchanan, Andrew Bruce, Jack Scott, Mr Wiggins, Mr Hopps, Reverend Henty, Luke Benson, Mr Roper, Wilf, Tony Scott, Sheila Scott, Rosie Herriot, Jimmy Herriot.
5	"When Dreams Come True"	1 October 1988
Helen is on her feet again. James finds a new house and has a meeting with Mr Gregson, his bank manager. Siegfried is thinking of changing his drugs rep, until the current one, Mr Barge, helps to cure a nasty case of white scour. Calum treats a flock of sheep with an everyday remedy. Characters: Calum Buchanan, Aloysius Barge, Mr Gregson, Mr Hartley, Mr Clark, Jeff Mallock, Jonathan Dixon. Tristan Farnon does not appear for the rest of the current series, having left for Ireland during the previous episode
6	"A New Chapter"	8 October 1988
James attends a Northern Veterinary Society lecture with Granville Bennett. They arrive late, but Granville is not too concerned: apparently he only attends for the post-lecture food and drink. James ends up very much the worse for wear, as usual, but this time food poisoning is the culprit. While James is away, his dog, Dan, suffers a heart attack. Calum tells Helen about some Border Terrier pups for sale and she decides to buy one. James and Helen move into their new house, Rowangarth. Characters: Calum Buchanan, Granville Bennett, Bert Chapman, Mrs Chapman, Joe Bentley, Percy Oakley, Bill Warrington, Jimmy Herriot, Rosie Herriot.
7	"A Present From Dublin"	15 October 1988
Calum falls for a beautiful girl named Molly, whom he met while tuberculin testing in Ireland. Deirdre pays a surprise visit in order to rekindle their relationship while Molly is staying at Skeldale House. Calum is torn at first but realises he has always been in love with Deirdre. James receives an invitation to examine Lord Buttermere's new stallion. Characters: Calum Buchanan, Deirdre McEwan, Molly McFeely, Mrs Bartram, Mr Birtwhistle, Mrs Birtwhistle, Len Birtwhistle, Lord Buttermere.
8	"The Salt of the Earth"	22 October 1988
With Tristan still away in Ireland, Siegfried hires young vet Willy Bannister to help them out for a couple of weeks. To Calum's dismay, Mr Bannister is a teetotaler who is fond of opera. He is excited, however, by the rumour that Willy is a good cook. James treats a dog that was run over. Calum cooks a meal for James and Siegfried, but it takes so long to prepare that his guests have drunk too much and decide to go to the kitchen to see how it's coming on. Characters: Calum Buchanan, Willie Bannister, Mary Jane Wain, Bernard Wain, Eleanor Dimmock, Mr Dimmock, Mrs Dimmock, Mrs Pounder, Albert Penn, Mrs Plumb.
9	"Cheques and Balances (numbered as episode 2 in the opening titles)"	29 October 1988
Siegfried is determined to get payment of outstanding bills from the local farmers. James is given the virtually impossible task of getting payment from Mr Biggins. The worst offender, Major Bullen, is given too much benefit of the doubt by Siegfried. Characters: Calum Buchanan, Mr Biggins, Hilda Biggins, Grimsdale, Major Bullen, Dennis Pratt, Mallaby, Mallock.
10	"Female of the Species"	5 November 1988
An old friend asks Siegfried to show his daughter, Emma, a veterinary student, what a country practice is like. Calum takes a fancy to Emma. After experiencing the resistance of local farmers to female vets, and realising that Calum is getting too keen on her, Emma decides to return home. Jack Sanders' dog does not seem to be recovering from a minor injury. Characters: Calum Buchanan, Deirdre McEwan, Emma Styles, Mr Biggins, Jack Sanders, Betty Sanders, Mrs Bell, Joe Harris, Simon Harris, Peter
11	"The Jackpot"	12 November 1988
James has returned from a fortnight's holiday in Scotland. He has trouble readjusting to work, wearing shorts on his rounds, which provides his clients with no shortage of amusement. James talks Siegfried into lending him his car for a few days while the latter is away on holiday. Characters: Calum Buchanan, Deirdre McEwan, Mrs Ridge, Nick O'Brian, Robert Corner, Mr Tansy, Jack Tansy, Ted Hardacre, Mrs Meynell, Mr Meynell.
12	"Two of a Kind"	19 November 1988
Calum nurses a young fox back to health, but releasing it back into its habitat proves more difficult than he expected. Dick Fawcett's cat suddenly starts collapsing into unconsciousness. James discovers that the cat has been drinking the liquid painkiller which Dick takes to relieve the pain caused by his cancer. Calum mistakenly thinks he has a rival for Deirdre's affections when she brings Anthony to Darrowby. Calum proposes to Deirdre. Siegfried treats a dog for a weak heart and gets a reputation as a TV repairman. Characters: Calum Buchanan, Deirdre McEwan, Dick Fawcett, Mr Chandler, John Elder, Nurse Duggan.

=== Series 6 (1989) ===
The opening credits hark back to that of the first run, with Siegfried driving the car and James being the passenger in an excerpt from the episode "The Rough and the Smooth". For that of the first few episodes, the footage was filmed late in 1988 or in early 1989, as there is snow on the hills. The interior car shot is updated later in the series with material from spring- and summer-time.

Later still in the series, the credits begin with Siegfried and James leaving J.R. Stubbs Provisions, getting back in the car and driving over the bridge featured in the series' first run.

No.	Title	Original release date
1	"Here and There"	2 September 1989
With their families away in London for the week, Siegfried suggests that he and James move into Skeldale House. Siegfried is excited to re-live yesteryear by spending long evenings talking about all and sundry. Things do not work out that way, of course. James meets Basil Courtenay, a man with an interesting past who is now working as a cowman. Characters: Calum Buchanan, Deirdre McEwan, Mr Dawson, Basil Courtenay, George Whitehead, Mr Coates, Sam Hall. Tristan Farnon does not appear
2	"The Course of True Love"	9 September 1989
After a series of misunderstandings, Calum and Deirdre fall out. Siegfried tries to heal the rift. The couple patch up their differences and become engaged. James meets former client Jim Potts, who is now retired. James vows to visit whenever he's passing, but tragedy strikes. Reigning sovereign George VI dies on 6 February 1952. Characters: Calum Buchanan, Deirdre McEwan, Jim Potts, Mrs Potts, Mr Bush. Tristan Farnon does not appear
3	"The Call of the Wild"	16 September 1989
Calum has an article published in the Veterinary Record. Siegfried thinks Calum plans to accept a job in Canada after he chastises him about bringing wildlife into Skeldale. James helps Barbara Hazlitt determine whether her collie has the aptitude to become a sheepdog. Siegfried and Calum visit Mrs Bond to treat one of her many felines, including the son of the late and vicious Boris. Deirdre and Calum get married. Tristan returns from Ireland to be best man. Characters: Calum Buchanan (final appearance), Deirdre Buchanan (final appearance), Barbara Hazlitt, Mrs Bond, Mr Skipton, George (postman). Tristan Farnon returns but does not appear for the remainder of the current series
4	"The Nelson Touch"	23 September 1989
Siegfried calls on the Blackwoods to treat a sick dog, but instead tries his hand at diagnosing human ailments. He also has to deal with the very odd Mr Hopps, who's seeking advice on the care of his dog. There is no dog, however, and Siegfried discovers Hopps is hoping to take advantage of the downturn in fortunes at the Blackwoods' farm. James castrates some pigs at Lord Hulton's estate and wins the pools. Characters: Charlie, Bert, Hughie, Mr Blackwood, Mrs Blackwood, Mr Hopps, Harry (Dr.) Allinson.
5	"Blood and Water"	30 September 1989
With Calum now in Nova Scotia, Siegfried calls on Willie Bannister to help out once more. James meets two brothers who share a cottage but have not spoken to one another for fifty years. Oliver breeds rabbits, while Roland grows cabbage. Now one of Oliver's rabbits is ill and he blames his brother. Mr Hartley ropes Siegfried into speaking to a local farmers group, which meets at the Drovers Arms. Having accepted, Siegfried tries everything he can think of to wiggle out of it again. Characters: Oliver Strong, Roland Strong, Mr Dowson, Willie Bannister, Mr Hartley, Mr Biggins, Grimsdale, Glenys Truscott, Norman.
6	"Where Sheep May Safely Graze"	7 October 1989
James and Helen are worried about David Brathwaite, a local sheep farmer who has recently lost his wife. James deals with confectioner Geoff Hatfield's sick cat. He finds himself pestered by Mrs Pumphrey and Mrs Tibbett, who both want constant bulletins on the cat's progress. Characters: Mrs Pumphrey, Geoff Hatfield, David Braithwaite, Mrs Tibbett, Hodgekin, Richard Bailie, Alice Bailie.
7	"The New World"	14 October 1989
James has to deal with Vernon Harker, a lazy farmer who neglects his stock and the vets' advice. Siegfried treats Lady Hulton's aristocratic feline, Bess. Having made light of small-animal care, Siegfried has to backtrack. James is lumbered with Susie Thornton's monkey, which has a severe case of diarrhoea. Characters: Lady Hulton, Sister Rose, Rupe Nellist, Mrs Mason, Vernon Harker, Mrs Harker, Len Birtwhistle, Susie Thornton.
8	"Mending Fences"	21 October 1989
Siegfried has to deal with Jenny Garston and David Rayner, two neighbours who have been feuding for years. Siegfried and James almost fall foul of the law when they have an off-hours pint at the Black Horse. Characters: Jenny Garston, David Rayner, Elizabeth Rayner, Geoffrey Rayner, Nurse Brown, Cliff Brown, Reg Wilkey, P.C. Goole, Tony Binns.
9	"Big Fish, Little Fish"	28 October 1989
James is talked into playing in the annual 'Gentlemen v Players' cricket match. He is playing for the Gentlemen, while the Players are being captained by young Freddie Trueman. When James is injured fielding, Siegfried has to take his place at the crease. The Taylors are concerned about Maggie, their lame horse. Siegfried is accompanied on his rounds by young Colin Appleby, who has a sick goldfish. Characters: Colonel Jenkins, Arnie Braithwaite, Rachel Taylor, Bob Taylor, Colin Appleby, Brian Appleby, Alison Appleby, Freddie Trueman, Alec, Albert Wiggs.
10	"In Whom We Trust"	4 November 1989
Itinerant worker Roddy Travers arrives back in Darrowby. There is a sudden outbreak of theft, and Roddy is suspected. Eventually, the real culprit is found to be Roddy's dog, Murphy. Then a local farmer accuses Murphy of killing his sheep and it looks as if the dog will have to be put down. Characters: Roddy Travers, Sam Witchell, Mary Hawkins, Mr Hawkins, Fred Allan, Miranda.
11	"The Rough and the Smooth"	11 November 1989
Siegfried treats an over-active horse owned by the eccentric Darnley sisters, one of whom is quite sure that Siegfried's power over horses borders on witchcraft. James has several encounters with Mr Ripley, whose laziness in getting a new gate causes grievous bodily harm to all those who approach his farm. Bill Ramsey leaves his Great Dane, Henrietta, in the care of the vets. Siegfried tries to introduce greater efficiency into the work of the practice, with mixed results. It is the fifteenth anniversary of James' arrival in Darrowby — an occasion Siegfried is determined to acknowledge. Characters: Sybil Darnley, Edie Darnley, Mr Ripley, Mrs Ripley, Bill Ramsey.
12	"The Best Time"	18 November 1989
Old Grandma Clarke has no time for her neighbour, Italian Franco Pedretti. She dislikes him solely because her son died in his homeland during World War II. Siegfried tries to bring about a reconciliation. James works with Bert Longshaw, who is having problems with his imported cows. Tricki-Woo requires surgery, but Mrs Pumphrey opts for a non-invasive medical treatment, with particularly interesting side effects. Characters: Mrs Pumphrey, Mrs Clarke, Franco Pedretti, Bert Longshaw, Jeff Mallock, Mary Clarke.

=== Series 7 (1990) ===
The opening credit sequence of the early episodes of the final series again features Siegfried and James driving around the Dales, this time from head-on rather than from the driver's side of the vehicle. For episodes involving Tristan, he is also filmed driving his convertible, wearing a flat cap and waving at two women having a picnic by the roadside.

"Knowin' How To Do It" and "If Music Be the Food of Love" feature the J.R. Stubbs opening credits.

In the closing credits sequence, the three vets are seen exiting a shop called Players Please, next door to The Castle Tea Shop, before getting into Siegfried's car. The closing credits sequences are changed later in the series, with James exiting the back of Skeldale House and being roped into assisting Siegfried in working on the latter's car. Helen and Mrs Alton also receive isolated introductions. For the final episode, the closing credits sequences return to their early-series format.

No.	Title	Original release date
1	"The Prodigal Returns"	1 September 1990
After two years in Ireland, Tristan returns to Darrowby and promptly falls victim of James' practical joke which leaves him intent on avoiding Susie Parker at all costs. Skeldale House needs a new housekeeper, and Siegfried wants to give the job to Mrs Alton. He sends Tristan to finalise the arrangements, but he offers the job to the wrong Mrs Alton. James continues to do battle with Mr Biggins, and has to deal with the Birse's neglected and seriously ill dog. Characters: Mrs Alton, Mr Biggins, Sylvia Alton, Susie Parker, Mrs Birse, Bert Chapman, Mr Howell, Tom Randall, Mrs Howell, Joe Manton.
2	"Knowin' How To Do It"	8 September 1990
Tristan is in trouble after he accidentally injects some anti-abortion vaccine into Nat Briggs's backside. The young farmer in question becomes convinced that Tristan has ruined his chances of having a family, so he threatens violent retribution. Siegfried receives a letter threatening legal action. James tries his hand at carpentry with the hope of a gift for Helen in mind. Helen, in turn, wonders why James keeps disappearing. Characters: Mrs Alton, Nat Briggs, Mr Edwards, Sally Worrall, Barbara Briggs, Ray, Phil, Steven.
3	"If Music Be the Food of Love"	15 September 1990
Tristan takes a fancy to young Jane Mercer. She belongs to a local choral society, so, naturally, Tristan suddenly displays a keen interest. When his new flame becomes concerned about the aggressive Mr Bullock's donkey, Tristan has to go beyond the call of duty to support her. While the surgery treats his dog, Persephone, Granville Bennett gives Siegfried a lesson in collecting payment of outstanding bills. Characters: Mrs Alton, Granville Bennett (final appearance), Mr Biggins, Jane Mercer, Mr Bullock, Mr Mercer, Hilda Biggins, Sally (uncredited).
4	"A Friend For Life"	22 September 1990
James and Siegfried become involved in the Shadwell family's arguments over cattle. Mr Grimsdale's bull has swallowed a metal object, but the farmer will not agree to surgery. Tristan uses a metal detector to convince him that the animal needs urgent treatment. Characters: Mrs Alton, Molly Shadwell, Bill Shadwell, Peter Shadwell, Grimsdale (final appearance), Bob Stockdale, Adam Stockdale, Louise Shadwell, Joanna Shadwell, Vicar.
5	"Spring Fever"	29 September 1990
The vets have problems with Mrs Donovan, who dispenses her homemade animal remedies to anyone who will listen. St. John, one of Tristan's old college friends, needs a bed for a while. Tristan lets him stay at Skeldale House, but he does not want his brother to know. Tristan is head over heels with a female client again. This time it is Rosemary Brocklehurst, whose ailing pet tortoise means Tristan has to do some swotting-up on the subject. Characters: Mrs Alton, St. John, Mrs Donovan, Rosemary Brocklehurst, Mr Carter, Mr Morton, Mr Reed.
6	"Out With The New"	6 October 1990
It is Queen Elizabeth II's coronation, and 1953 Darrowby prepares to celebrate. Tristan has gone to London to witness it in person. Siegfried deals with an attack of liver fluke in a sheep with a herbal remedy. James has to tackle Wolfie, a dog with a smelly problem. Rosie is to play a princess in the school pageant, but has come down the flu. Jimmy, meanwhile, who is to play the archbishop, thinks his cloak makes him look like a sissy. Thieves are striking in Darrowby. Characters: Mrs Alton, Rosie Herriot, Jimmy Herriot, Susie Thornton, Gibson, Mrs Coates, Mr Hart, Mrs Hart, Simon, Paul Tristan Farnon does not appear
7	"Food For Thought"	13 October 1990
Siegfried's old friend Stewie Brannan arranges for Professor Norton to come to a formal dinner at Skeldale House. Just before the meal, Siegfried and Stewie are called out to a calving and eat some food that disagrees with them. While they are on the call, James has to look after their guest, which means he's irreparably late for his anniversary dinner with Helen back at Rowangarth. Bernard Wain, a farm with a sensitive sense of smell, has taken up James' suggestion of wearing a handkerchief around his face when required. This, however, leads to an encounter with P.C. Hicks. Characters: Mrs Alton, Stewie Brannan, Professor Norton, Bernard Wain, Mary-Jane Wain, Mrs Davey, Mr Smethick, P.C. Hicks. Tristan Farnon does not appear
8	"A Cat In Hull's Chance"	20 October 1990
James and Helen have different ideas about dealing with daughter Rosie's wish to become a vet like her father. Helen wants to encourage her, while James sets out to show Rosie the less pleasant side of the practice. Under Siegfried's watch, Mrs Pettinger's kitten, Prudence, escapes and hitches a ride to Hull. While she is lost, Siegfried tells James and Tristan that it is time — with no concern about cost — to expand the surgery to include an observatory wing; when Prudence is found, however, he conveniently forgets all about it. James wants to put a tennis court in their back garden. Characters: Mrs Alton, Rosie Herriot, Jimmy Herriot, Mrs Pettinger, Bowling, Keith Lawrence, Angela Lawrence, Jack Hucknall. Tristan Farnon returns to the series
9	"A Grand Memory For Forgetting"	27 October 1990
When Jacob Pearson's dog is shot, Captain Crawford's son, Hugh, is the prime suspect. James treats old Arnie Braithwaite's dog, which may have diabetes. James and Siegfried are having problems getting payment from Dennis Pratt. Then they resort to a spot of blackmail. After paying a visit to the Hardwickes, Siegfried is unable to get home after losing his car keys. Characters: Mrs Alton, Captain Crawford, Dennis Pratt, Jacob Pearson, Arnie Braithwaite, Mr Hartley (final appearance), Hugh Crawford, Arthur Hardwicke, Ben Hardwicke. Tristan Farnon does not appear, instead he is assisting Stewie Brannan
10	"Old Dogs, New Tricks"	3 November 1990
Siegfried's old university friend, Henry Clintock, moves to the area. Siegfried tries to arrange for his old friend, Ewan Ross, whose veterinary practice has deteriorated since his wife's death, to be Clintock's vet. James has to look after Tricki-Woo while Mrs Pumphrey is in France. The pampered canine disappears, however. James gives advice to a young farmer on the purchase of a flock of sheep. Characters: Mrs Pumphrey, Hodgekin, Ewan Ross, Henry Clintock, Harold Peart, Mr Lupton, Silas Wenlow. Tristan Farnon does not appear
11	"Hampered"	10 November 1990
Siegfried is out of commission with his leg in plaster. Mrs Alton's attempts at taking care of his dietary needs infuriate him. Tristan, back in town after helping Stewie Brannan, is pursuing Mrs Pumphrey's great-niece, Angela Mortimer. He thinks she is perfect until he hears her laugh. James has to act as a judge at the Darrowby Vegetable Show, a choice he soon comes to regret when Hodgekin sweeps the board. Characters: Mrs Alton, Mrs Pumphrey (final appearance), Hodgekin (final appearance), Angela Mortimer, Charlie, Hughie, Bert, Mrs Baxter, Mr Simmons, Mr Collins, Mr Wilson.
12	"Promises To Keep"	17 November 1990
Tristan is on the defensive when his brother accuses him of sleeping in. It transpires that he was out all night with a premature calving followed by a prolapse of the uterus at the Longwall farm. Convinced that he is purposely being given all the difficult jobs, he insists Siegfried swap rounds for the day, including a pig which he suspects is a family pet. But when he's also asked to castrate its litter of piglets, his careless disposal of the 'cut-offs' full of anaesthetic leads to the numerous farm cats eating them and passing out. The vets try to help Mrs Clarke, an old lady who's finding it difficult to keep her farm going as her health is failing. James advises Franco on the local custom when it comes to proposing a hand in marriage. Characters: Mrs Alton, Mrs Clarke, Mr Sutcliffe, Franco Pedretti, Katharine, Mary Clarke, Judith.
13	"Brotherly Love: Christmas Special"	24 December 1990
Christmas 1953 is fast approaching. James and Tristan become involved in a feud between the Bradley brothers, who both want to ring the Christmas bells. A suspected case of foot-and-mouth disease threatens to ruin the festivities. The practice is introduced to Joe Mulligan's successor to Clancy. Tristan's purchase of a new Daimler coupé turns out to be a mistake when he tries to find the money to pay back his brother. Characters: Mrs Alton, Mr Biggins, Jonathan Bradley, David Bradley, Mrs Bradley, Linda Marston, Frank Gillard, Angela Gillard, Mary Gillard, Joe Mulligan, Leslie Pendlebury, Isaac Cranford, Barry Stokes, Bert Grimes, Major Wakeman, Mr Hammond, Edge Pickles, Dan Goodman, Sam (barman), P.C. Goole.
