= Bovine vaginal prolapse =

Medical condition in cattle

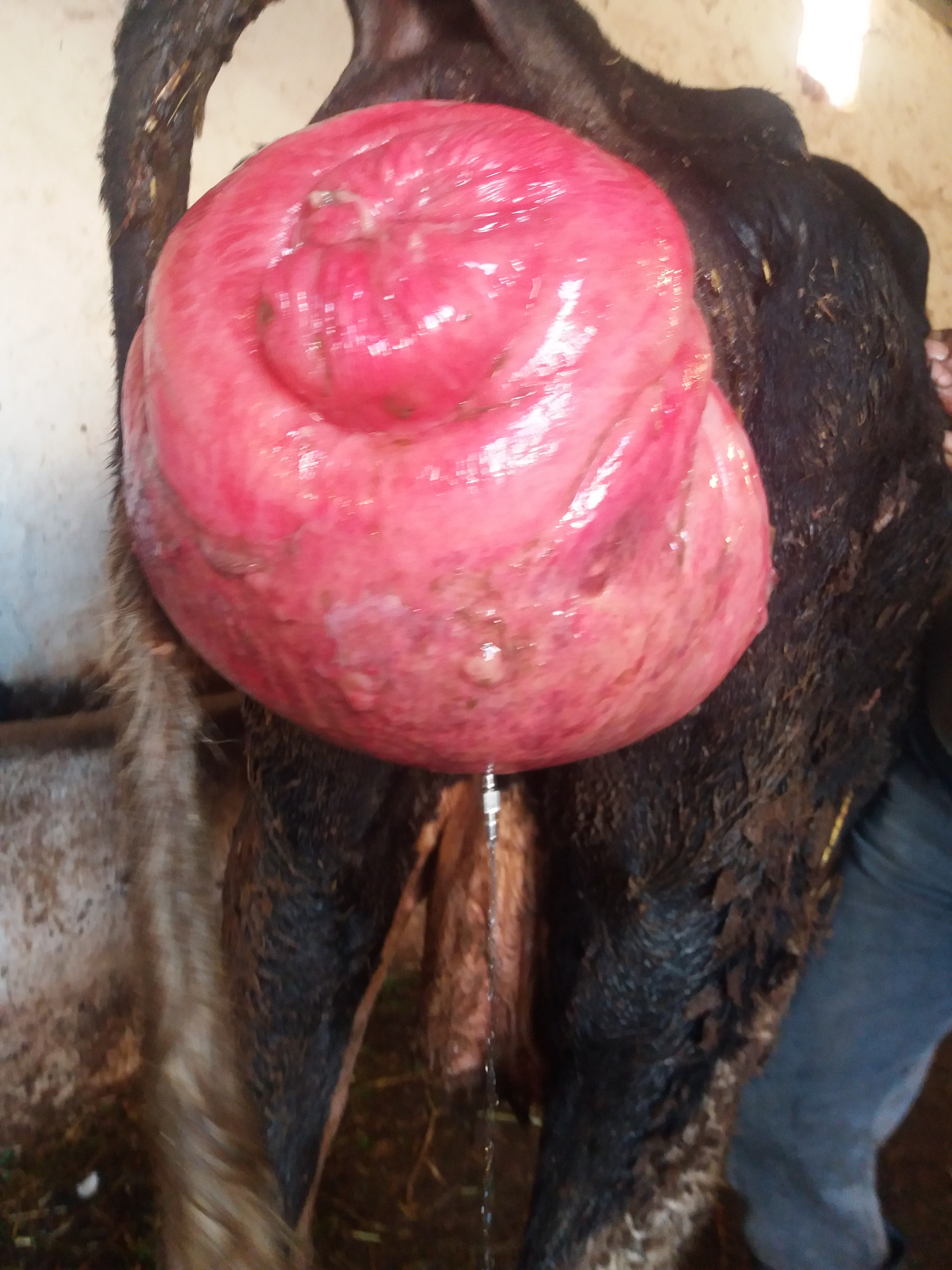
prolapsed vagina with urinary bladder, being emptying (needle).

Bovine vaginal prolapse is a medical condition in cattle, characterised by an abnormally positioned (prolapsed) vagina. In most cases the bovine vaginal prolapse occurs near the time of calving, yet there are some examples of the vaginal prolapse in younger and non-pregnant animals. Another, but less common and more severe reproductive prolapse in cattle is so-called bovine uterine prolapse, where a uterus is the one being abnormally positioned.

== Characteristics ==
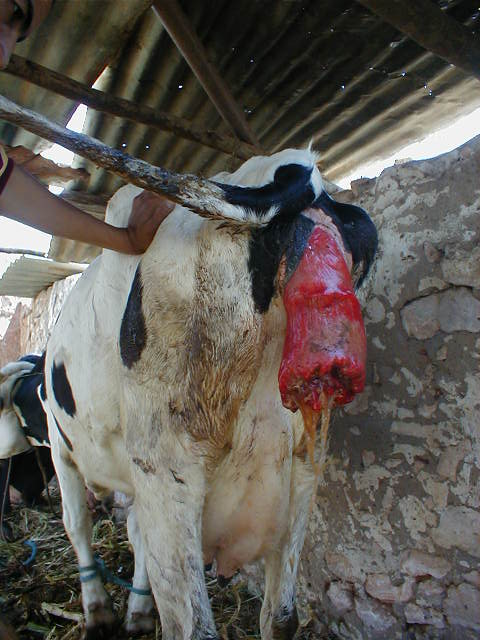
Severe vaginal prolapse in dairy cow.

Bovine prolapsed vagina can occur when the cow is near calving, in the late phases of cow's pregnancy (usually last trimester). Sometimes cow's cervix prolapses along its vagina, and such condition is known as the bovine cervico-vaginal prolapse. It can happen that cow's urinary bladder gets contained within the prolapsed vagina.

Prolapsed vagina is seen as a pink mass of tissue that protrudes outside of the cow's body. Severity of this condition varies a lot between individual cows, hence in some exposed vagina reaches the size of a large citrus fruit, while in others it can be as big as a soccer ball. Sometimes prolapsed vagina shrinks when a cow stands up, as a pressure on its body is reduced.

== Cause ==
Prolapse of the vagina happens as a consequence of increased pressure in the abdominal cavity of cows. Increased production of estrogen and high relaxin levels also play a role, as both hormones result in ligamentous laxity and laxity of soft tissue of the pelvic canal and perineum.

There are several factors that can influence the occurrence of the vaginal prolapse in cattle. It has been shown that cows, grazing clover pastures, have higher probability of experiencing vaginal prolapse when near the time of calving. This is a consequence of phytoestrogens, which are made when cows forage on such kind of pastures. Another way of reducing the risk is regulating cow's body weight, as overweight cows in the last trimester of their pregnancy are often subdued to reproductive prolapses. This is a consequence of intra-abdominal fat.

Cows pregnant with twins, older pregnant cows, zebu (Bos indicus) and stabled cows are also more prone to experiencing the vaginal prolapse. Among other risk factors are trauma and coughing.

== Treatment ==
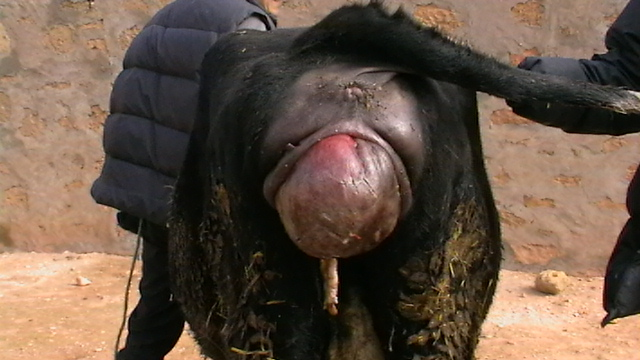
Intermediate vaginal prolapse in cow, with some of the exposed tissue already being necrotic.

Prolapsed vagina needs to be treated as fast as possible, as the exposed mass of vaginal tissue can get infected and overexposure to environmental factors (such as dirt, dust particles, sun, heat, cold or manure) can influence cow's body conditions. Another problem is the limited blood supply to the prolapsed mass of tissue, which causes vagina to swell and successful treatment is more demanding. Big prolapsed vagina presses on the urinary passage and it is harder (or impossible) for cows to urinate. Vaginal tissue exposed for too long can dry out or get damaged.

The vaginal prolapse in cattle is usually not as dangerous as some cases of bovine uterine prolapse, and majority of cows with prolapsed vagina are not in the risk of losing their life. When treating cow with a prolapsed vagina one needs to restrain the cow and limit its movement, as well as apply an epidural anesthetic. The prolapsed mass of tissue should then be cleaned with warm water, lubricated and some mild disinfectant should be applied, as these cows are often in the risk of getting an infection. In some cases it is useful to empty the cow's bladder right before the procedure. The next step is repositioning the exposed vagina and stitching the tissue around cow's vulva, as the vagina can prolapse again shortly after the incorrect procedure. The stitches must be removed before the next calving. Emptying prolapsed urinary bladder

Emptying prolapsed urinary bladder

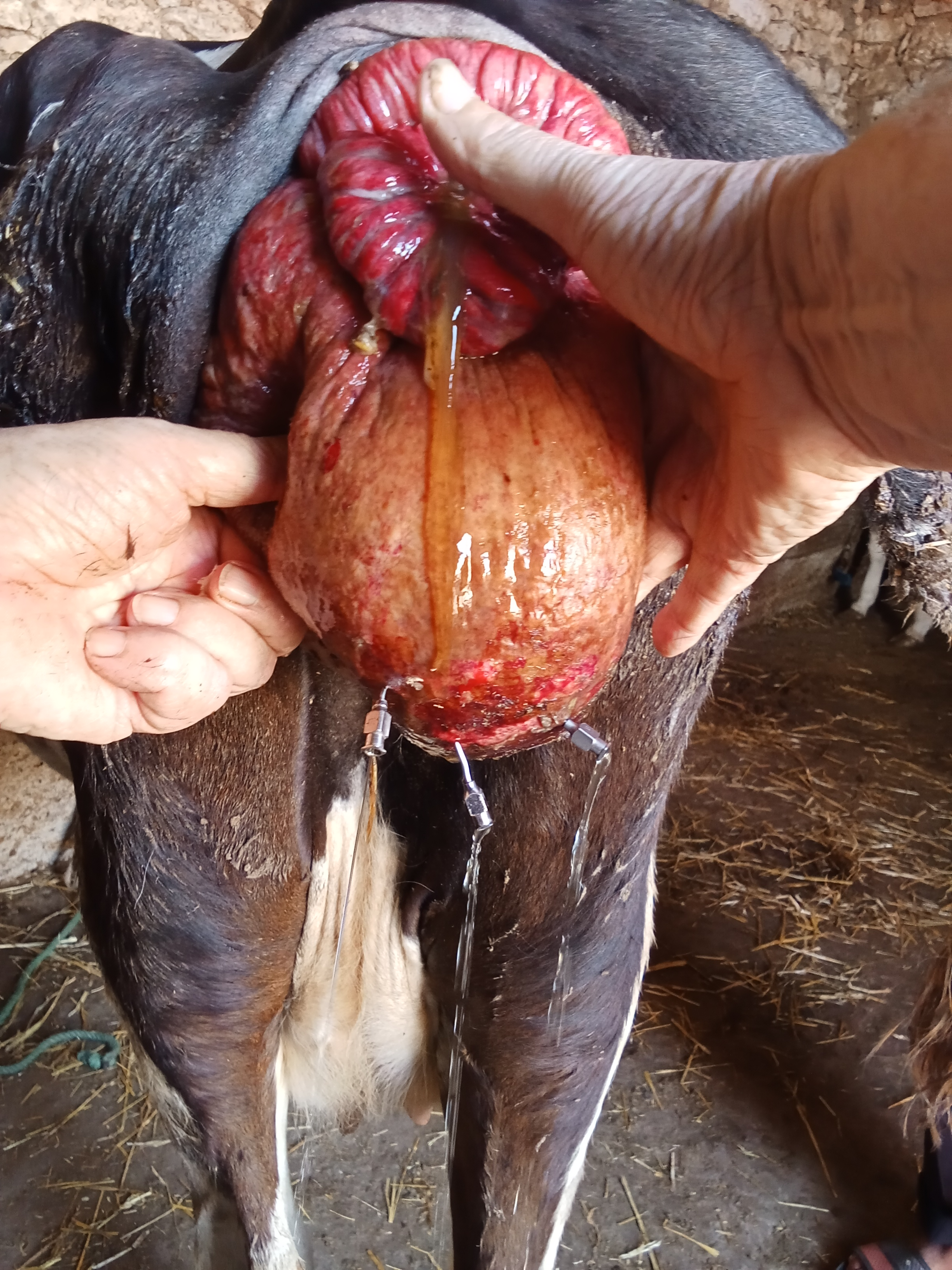

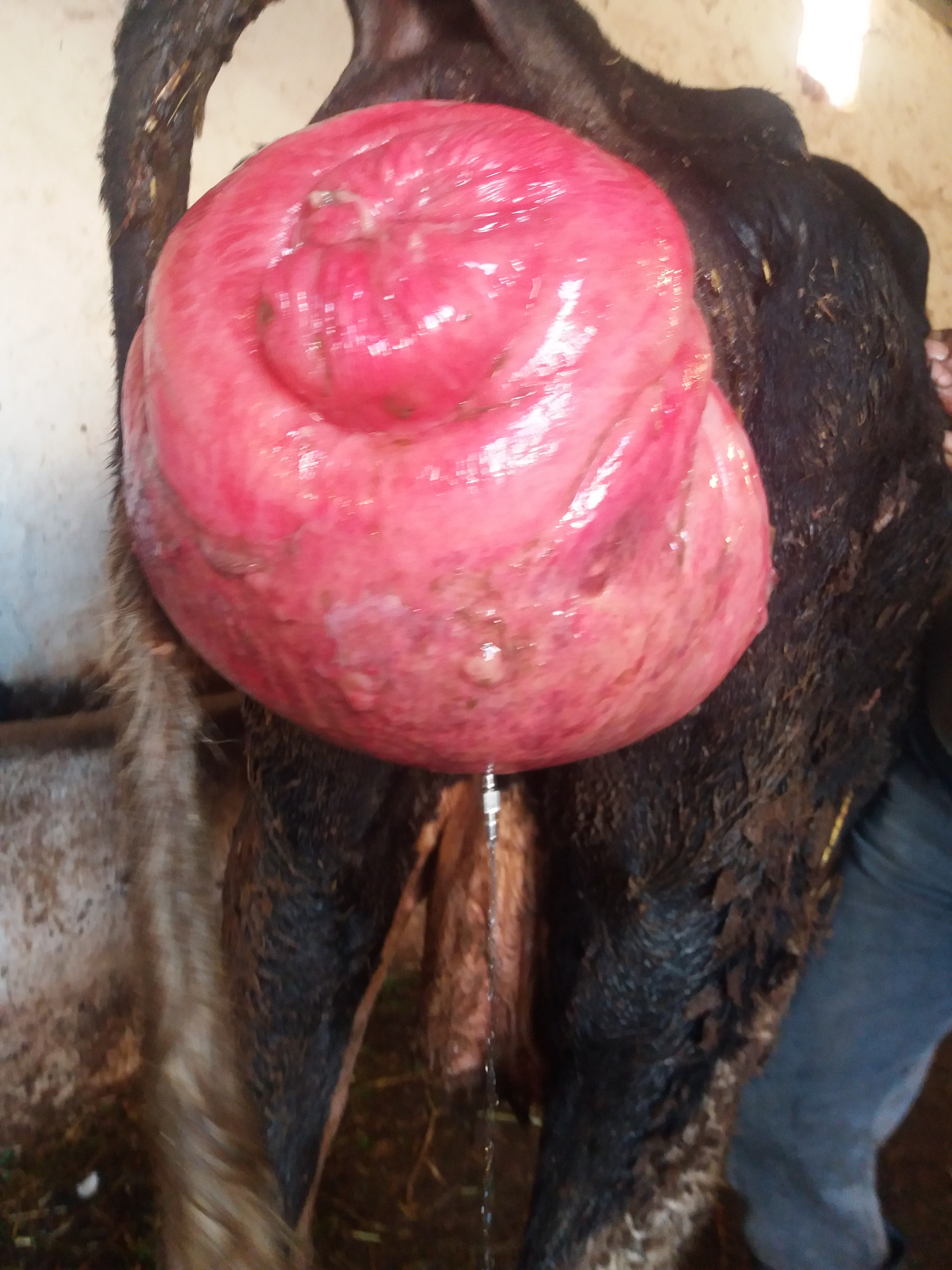

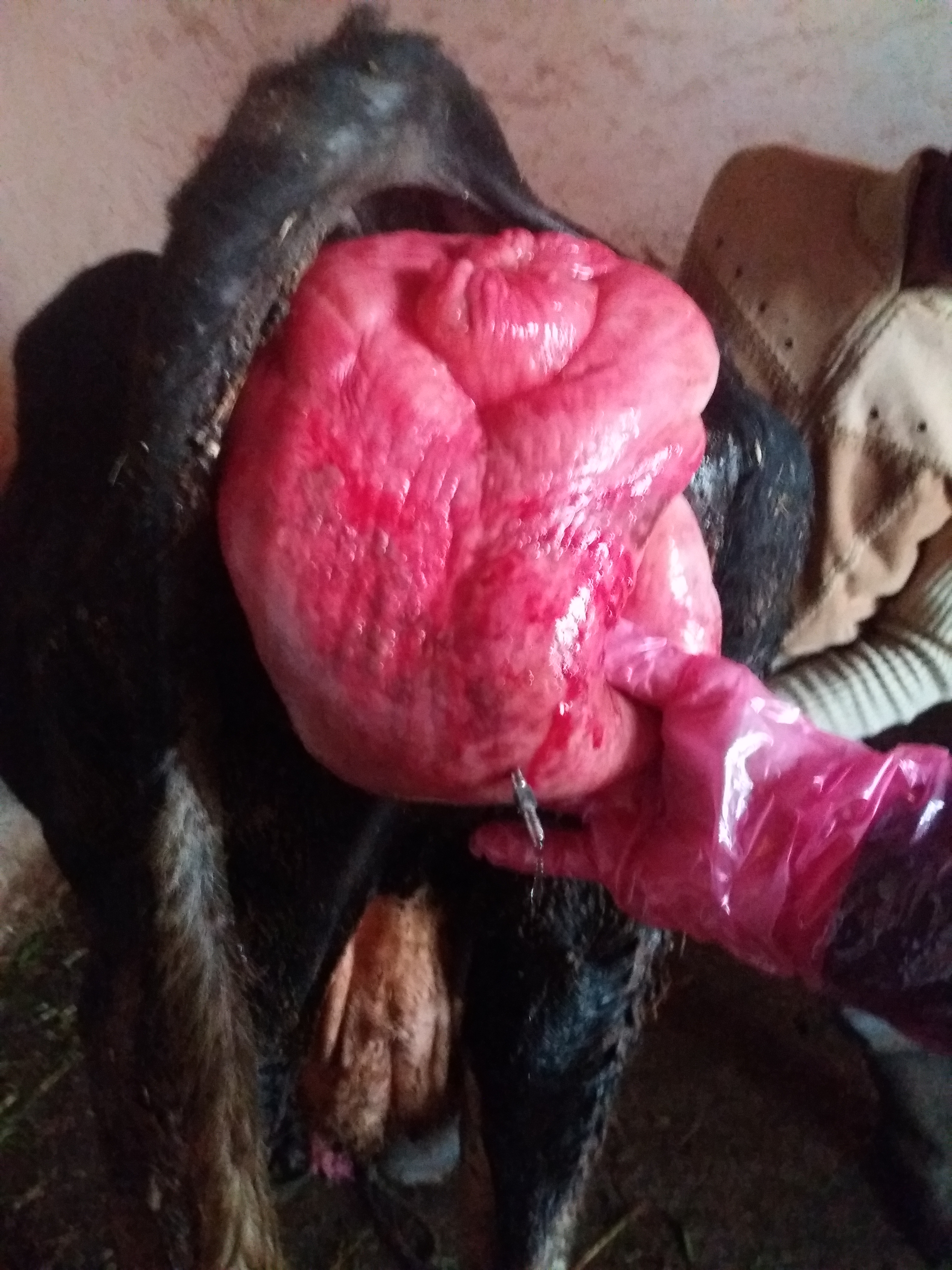

== Prognosis ==
The cow's prognosis after being properly treated for vaginal prolapse is normally favourable. When treated incorrectly, animals often get peritonitis and vaginal wall ruptures. The biggest problem represents the recurrent nature of vaginal prolapses, as the cow that already had prolapsed vagina has relatively high probability of experiencing the condition again in the following calving.

It is thought that genetic factors play a role in bovine vaginal prolapse, as cow's offspring exhibit high levels of vaginal prolapse if their mother has also experienced this condition. In practise, it is common to cull the offspring of cows that had their vaginas prolapsed and not use them for breeding. This guideline is practised for both sexes, as the bulls of mothers with recurrent vaginal prolapse can pass the inherited trait to their offspring.

== Occurrence ==
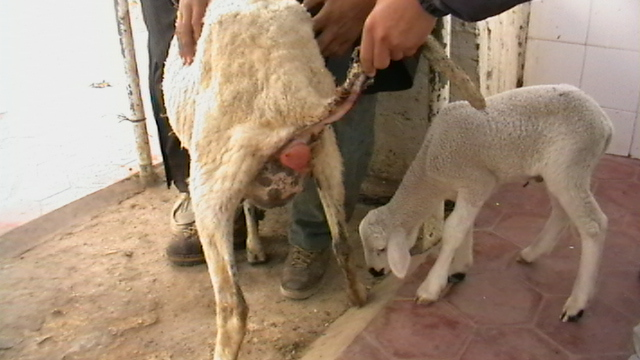
Vaginal prolapse is also common in ewes.

The vaginal prolapse often happens in cows, as well as ewes and sometimes sows. Similar condition is a characteristic of bitches.

== Differential diagnosis ==
Similar condition that is also connected with a prolapse of cow's reproductive organs, is so-called bovine uterine prolapse, when a uterus gets prolapsed. This usually occurs some hours after calving. The latter condition is much less common in cattle and can be life-threatening in extreme cases. The condition requires immediate treatment, which is either reducing the prolapse either amputating the exposed uterus and in severe cases euthanizing the animal, as an untreated cow can die from shock (intensive bleeding) or becomes infertile.

== See also ==
- Bovine uterine prolapse
