= Bovine uterine prolapse =

Abnormal positioning of the bovine uterus

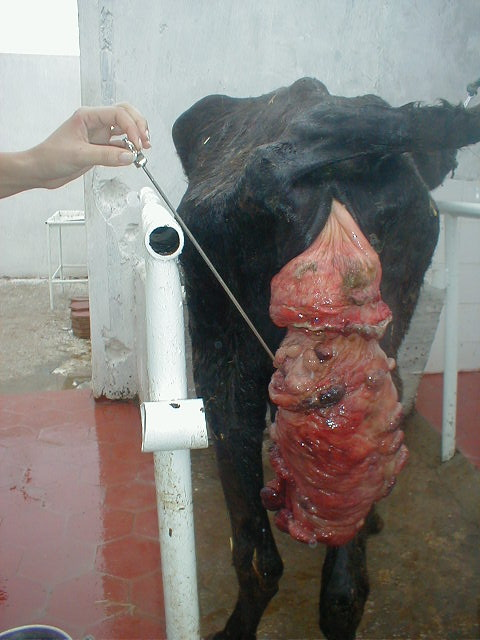
Prolapsed uterus in a cow

Bovine uterine prolapse occurs when the bovine uterus protrudes after calving. It is most common in dairy cattle and can occur in beef cows occasionally with hypocalcaemia. It is not as commonly seen in heifers, but occasionally can be seen in dairy heifers and most commonly Herefords.

Uterine prolapse is considered a medical emergency that puts the cow at risk of shock or death by blood loss. Factors during calving that increase the risk of uterine prolapse include: calving complications that cause injury or irritation of the external birth canal, severe straining during labor, and excessive pressure when a calf is manually extracted. Non-calving factors include nutrition problems such as low blood calcium, magnesium, protein, or generally poor body conditions.

In a complete uterine prolapse, the uterine horns also come out. When this happens, the uterus will hang below the hocks of the animal. When the uterus hangs below the hocks, the cow may lie on, step on or kick the exposed tissue, which increases the risk of rupturing a major artery. The uterus can become easily infected as it bruises easily and can become covered with manure.

== Causes ==
Uterine prolapse occurs after calving when the cervix is open and the uterus lacks tone. It occurs most commonly in the hours after calving, but may also occur up to a week later.

When the uterine prolapse does not occur directly after calving, it can be more dangerous for the cow. It is most likely that during parturition, the uterus was slightly everted, which suggests that the prolapse did not take place until after the calf was born. In these cases, the uterus is more likely to be infected. This increases the possibility that the uterus cannot be replaced in the animal, and must instead be removed.

== Treatment ==
When a cow suffers a uterine prolapse, there are two options for treating it: reduction or amputation. If the treatment is reduction, then the placenta will be removed, the endometrium thoroughly cleaned, any lacerations fixed, and the uterus replaced in the right position. If amputation is the course of action, the uterus is removed. In extreme cases, the cow may have hemorrhaged and suffered intense shock and therefore will be euthanized.

When choosing a treatment, considerations include:

- Placenta. It is possible that the placenta has already separated from the uterus, but in other cases it has to be manually removed. It is extremely rare to not be able to separate the placenta from the uterus after a prolapse, but if it cannot be removed, it causes problems as it is impossible to adequately clean it if it has been on the ground and this dirt will interfere with the reduction. It would be possible to cut around each cotyledon and clean the rest as thoroughly as possible and replace.
- Trauma. If the trauma is too severe, reduction is not recommended. The trauma or exposure to the environment could cause devitalization of the uterus and if it is too severe, it could cause further problems if placed back inside.
- Gross hemorrhage. If there is a lot of hemorrhaging, then there is no reason to perform the reduction and therefore amputation is the preferred option. Gross hemorrhaging can occur in a scared animal that cannot be restrained. If violent struggling or running occurs with the prolapsed uterus, it can cause extreme distress, coma, and death.

During treatment of a prolapsed uterus, the animal must be positioned correctly to avoid increased bloat. A bloated rumen can make it much more difficult to perform a reduction.

== Prevention ==
There is no way to completely prevent uterine prolapse. To reduce the risk, cows are returned to a standing position and encouraged to move around as soon as possible after calving. This is especially important in cases where a calf is pulled to assist the mother. When the cow stands, the uterus normally drops back into the abdominal cavity, which straightens out the uterine horns.

== Prognosis ==
The prognosis is generally favorable if the cow survives having the uterus replaced; most cows survive into the long term.

Normally, if a prolapsed uterus is placed back into the animal correctly, there are no further complications. However, there is a chance of secondary infection, which can cause the cow to be slow to re-breed or even unable to be re-bred at all. Genetics does not make a difference in the risk of prolapsing again, but cows that have had a prolapse are at increased risk of having another.

== Differential diagnosis ==
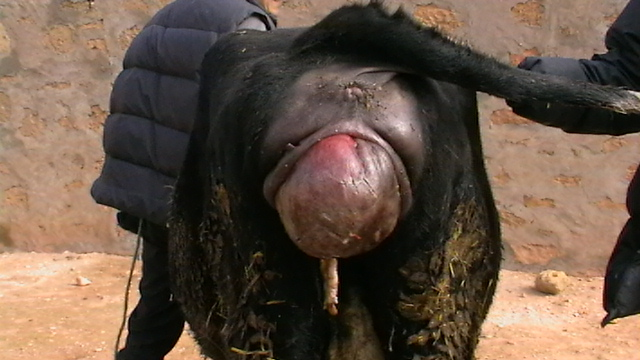
Vaginal prolapse

Uterine prolapse can often be confused with bovine vaginal prolapse. A vaginal prolapse appears as a small pink or red ball of tissue ranging in size from grapefruit to soccer ball. It emerges before calving, whereas a uterine prolapse takes place after calving. Vaginal prolapse occurs when there is an increase in pressure in the abdominal cavity during the late stages of parturition. It is more common than uterine prolapse and there is a genetic factor in the risk. It is quite common for a vaginal prolapse to occur in the same animal with each calving; uterine prolapse recurs less often.

== Other species ==
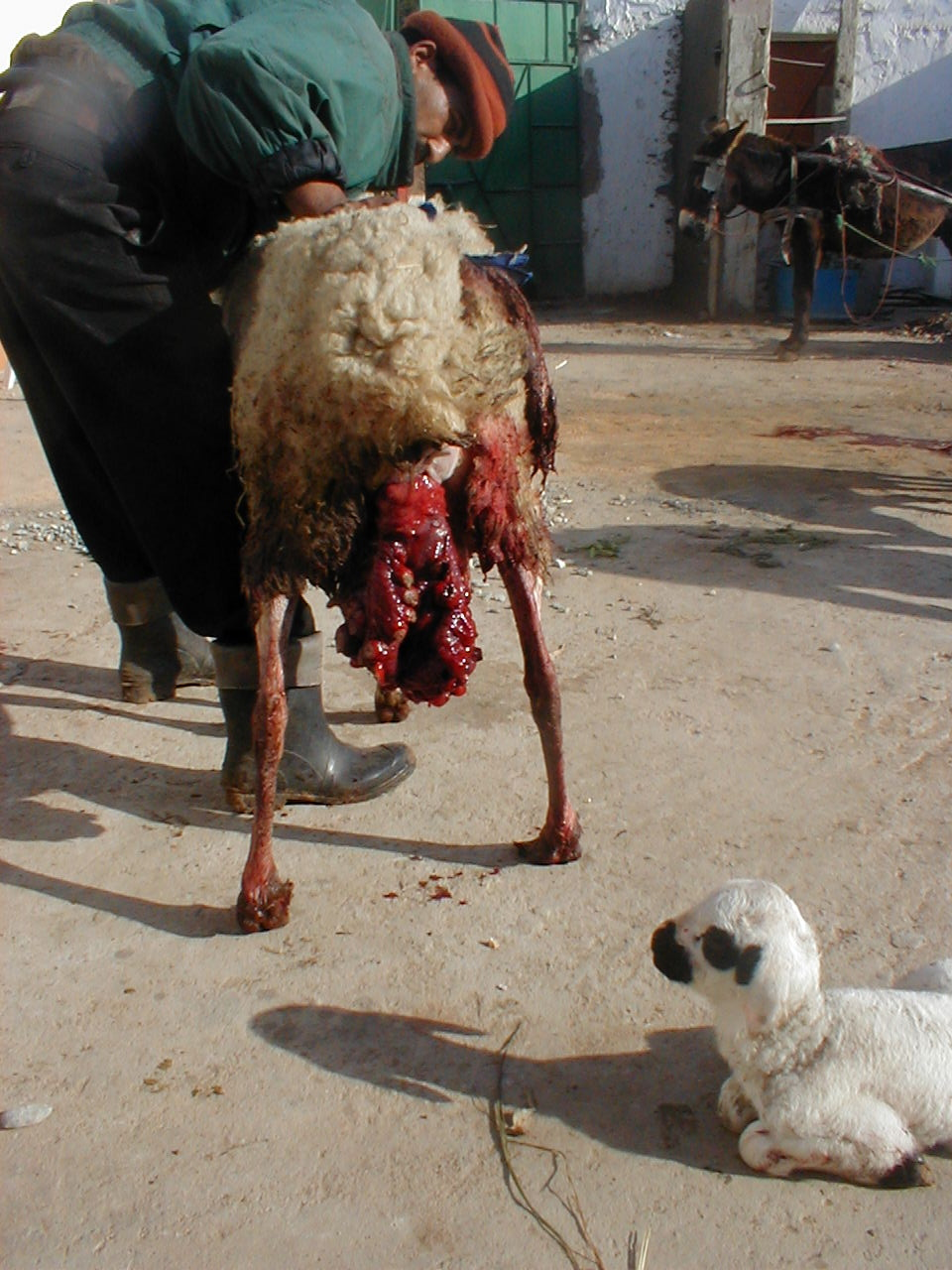
Prolapsed uterus in a ewe

Prolapsed uterus can occur in any species but is most common in dairy and beef cows and ewes than in sows and is rare in mares, felines, bitches, and rabbits.

== See also ==
- Bovine vaginal prolapse
