= Geography of Sussex =

- Continent: Europe
- Region: Southern England
- Area
  - Total: 3,783 km^{2} (1,461 sq mi)
- Coastline: 220 km (140 mi)
- Borders: Hampshire; Surrey; Kent
- Highest point: Blackdown; 280 m (919 ft)
- Longest river: River Medway (shared with Kent); 113 km (70 mi); Longest river entirely within Sussex is the River Arun; 60 km (37 mi)
- Largest lake: Bewl Water (shared with Kent); 3.12 km^{2} (1.20 sq mi) Longest inland body of water entirely within Sussex is Ardingly Reservoir; 0.8 km^{2} (0.31 sq mi)
- Climate: Oceanic "British" climate
- Terrain: hills, downland, woodlands, lowlands, wetlands, coastal, marine, urban
- Natural resources: iron, fish, timber, wildlife, wind power, shale gas, oil
- Natural hazards: European windstorms, floods, few and small tornadoes
- Environmental issues: Biodiversity loss, climate change, habitat fragmentation, rising sea levels, renewable energy, waste disposal, water pollution, population density

Sussex is a historic county and cultural region in the south of England corresponding roughly in area to the ancient Kingdom of Sussex. It is bounded on the north by Surrey, north-east by Kent, south by the English Channel, and west by Hampshire, and is divided for local government into West Sussex and East Sussex and the city of Brighton and Hove. The city of Brighton & Hove was created a unitary authority in 1997, and was granted City status in 2000. Until then Chichester had been Sussex's only city. By convention, Chichester is Sussex's capital city and Lewes is Sussex's county town.

Sussex encompasses approximately 3,783 square kilometres (1,461 sq mi). It is 120 km (75 mi) long and is between 35 and 40 km (22 and 25 mi) wide. For comparison, Sussex is slightly larger than the neighbouring county of Kent or Cornwall or the Indian state of Goa and is 50 per cent larger than Luxembourg. Sussex has a population of about 1.6 million, (Note: Combined population of local authority areas of Brighton and Hove (273,400), East Sussex, (527,200) and West Sussex (808,900)) about the same as Goa or the US state of Idaho and about three times the population of Cornwall.

Sussex has three main geographic sub-regions, each orientated approximately east to west. In the south-west of the county lies the fertile and densely populated coastal plain. North of this lie the rolling chalk hills of the South Downs, beyond which lies the well-wooded Sussex Weald.

== Climate ==
The coastal resorts of Sussex and neighbouring Hampshire are the sunniest places in the United Kingdom. The coast has consistently more sunshine than the inland areas: sea breezes, blowing off the sea, tend to clear any cloud from the coast. Most of Sussex lies in Hardiness zone 8; the exception is the coastal plain west of Brighton which lies in the milder zone 9.

Rainfall is below average with the heaviest precipitation on the South Downs with 950 mm (37 in) of rainfall per year. The close proximity of Sussex to the Continent of Europe, results in cold spells in winter and hot, humid weather in summer.

The climate of the coastal districts is strongly influenced by the sea, which, because of its tendency to warm up slower than land, can result in cooler temperatures than inland in the summer. In the autumn months, the coast sometimes has higher temperatures. Rainfall during the summer months is mainly from thunderstorms and thundery showers; from January to March the heavier rainfall is due to prevailing south-westerly frontal systems.

In winter the east winds can be as cold as further inland. Selsey is known as a tornado hotspot, with small tornadoes hitting the town in 1986, 1998 and 2000, with the 1998 tornado causing an estimated £10 million of damage to 1000 buildings.

== Geology ==
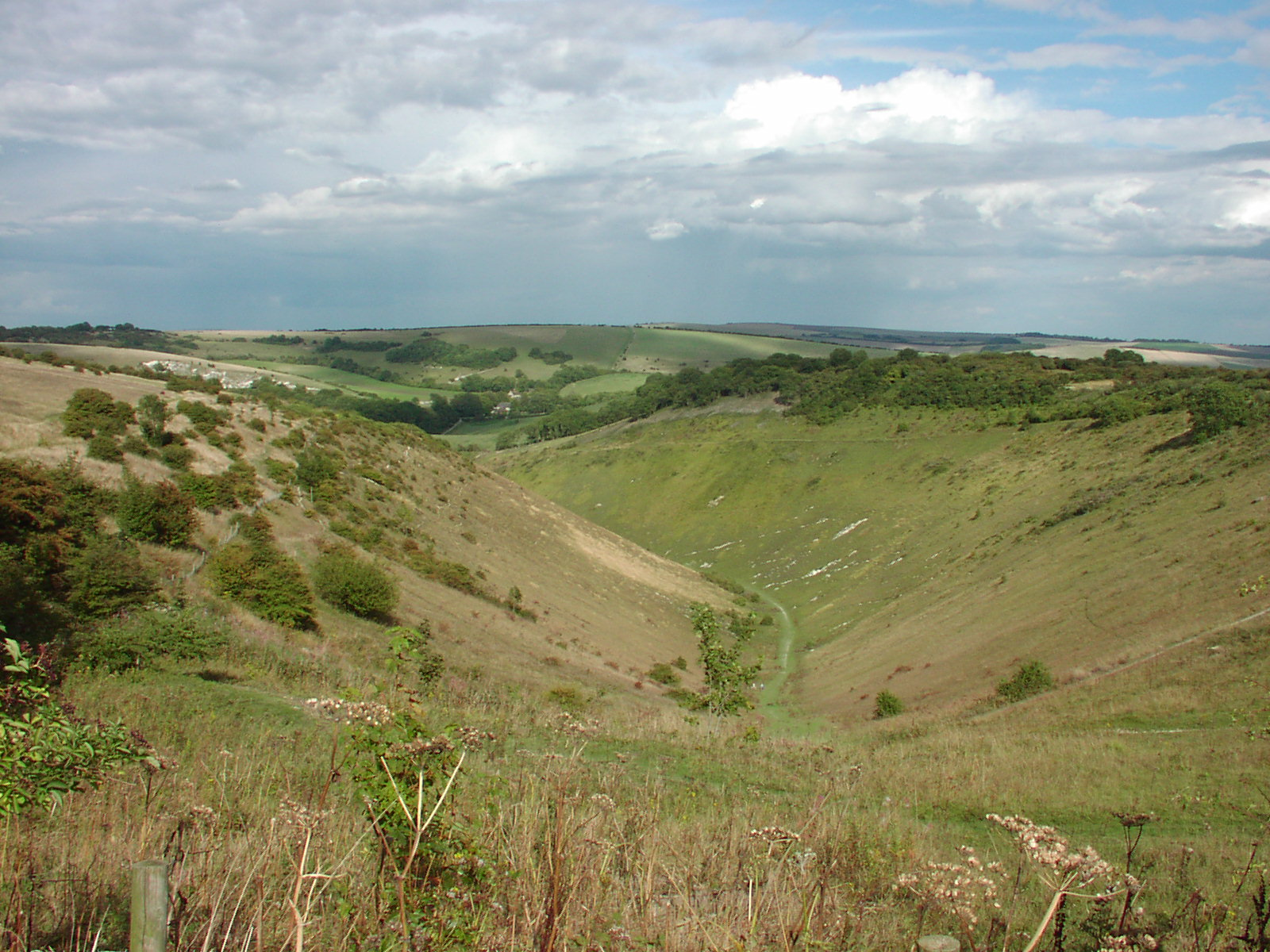
Devil's Dyke is the largest single coombe in the chalk karst of Britain.

Sussex's geology typically runs in bands running east–west. Running across the south of the county, from Hampshire to chalk cliffs of Beachy Head lies the chalk ridge of the South Downs. The South Downs form the southern rim of the Wealden anticline, a large and eroded dome of rocks, largely of Cretaceous age (140-65 million years old) which has had a significant influence on the development of the diverse topography of the county. Small exposures of rocks of Jurassic age (195-140 million years old) occur on the main axis of the Weald anticline and rocks of Tertiary age (65-2 million years old) are exposed along the coast in West Sussex. During the ice ages no glaciers reached Sussex, but the county was under the influence of very cold tundra-like conditions at the edge of the ice sheets. Processes of erosion and deposition during this period have contributed significantly to the formation of the present landscape.

With the exception of the youngest part of the Chalk, Sussex provides an almost complete sequence of Cretaceous rocks. They dip to the south with the consequence that increasingly younger rocks are exposed the further south you go. From the summit of the Downs the hilly country observed on the northern side is occupied mainly by the Hastings Beds and the Weald Clay; at the foot of the escarpment lie the Gault and Upper Greensand, while between these formations and the Wealden rocks there is an elevated ridge of ground formed by the Lower Greensand.

Between the South Downs and the English Channel is the South Coast Plain, also known as the Sussex-Hampshire Plain, part of the Hampshire-Dieppe basin, and it owes its level character to the action of marine planation. The plain is occupied partly by chalk and partly by Tertiary rocks, both much obscured by more recent deposits. The Eocene strata lying south of the Downs and west of Brighton - with the exception of some outliers of Reading Beds near Seaford - include the Woolwich and Reading Beds, London Clay (with hard "Bognor Rock"), the Bagshot and the Bracklesham Beds, which contain many fossils. Superficial deposits cover much of the coastal plain; these include glacial deposits with large boulders, raised beaches, brick earth and gravels, marine and estuarine, and the interesting Lower chalk or Coombe rock, formerly known as Elephant Beds, a coarse rubble of chalk waste formed late in the Glacial period, well exposed in the cliff at Black Rock east of Brighton, where it rests on a raised beach.

The southern side of the South Downs are deeply notched by dry valleys or coombes, which frequently end in cirques near the northern escarpment. Devil's Dyke is the most famous and remarkable of all the chalk dry valleys and is frequently cited as the type example. It is the largest single coombe anywhere in the chalk karst of Britain.

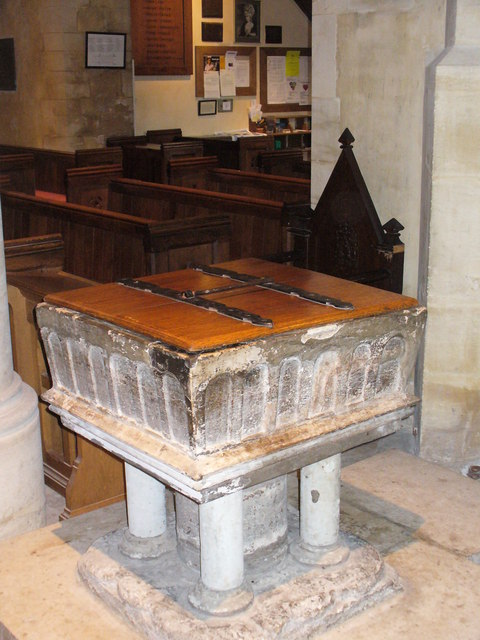
Sussex Marble has been used for building over hundreds of years

At one time there is no doubt that the Chalk, Greensand and Gault of the Wealden anticline covered the entire area in the form of an uplifted dome, but denudation has removed the Chalk and most of the other formations as far as the North Downs, thereby exposing the underlying Wealden Beds. The oldest rocks thus brought to light along the crest of the anticline are the Purbeck Beds, small patches of shale and limestone, with some important beds of gypsum, which lie north-west of Battle. A deep boring (1905 ft.) at Netherfield, passed through Portlandian Beds and Kimmeridge Clay into Oxford Clay, but these do not appear anywhere at the surface. Above the Purbeck Beds, and covering all the north-eastern portion, of the county from the coast at Bexhill and Rye to Horsham, are sands and clays of the Lower Wealden or Hastings Beds. This includes the following local subdivisions, in ascending order; the Fairlight Clay, Ashdown Sand, Wadhurst Clay, Lower Tunbridge Wells Sand, Grinstead Clay and Upper Tunbridge Wells Sand (with Tilgate stone at the top and Cuckfield Clay at the base). The Weald Clay occupies a belt of lower ground on the south and west of the Hastings Sands, it consists of blue and mottled clays with thin sand layers and beds of hard limestone, the "Sussex marble" with the shells of Viviparus. Horsham Stone is another local hard bed. Near Tilgate the remains of Iguanodon were found by Sussex geologist Gideon Mantell in this formation.

Bordering the outcrop of the Weald Clay is the Lower Greensand Group; it appears a little north of Eastbourne and passes thence through Ringmer, Storrington, Pulborough, Petworth, Midhurst and Linchmere. It contains the following divisions in ascending order - the Atherfield Clay, Hythe Beds (sandy limestone, sandstone and chert), Sandgate Beds and Folkestone Beds. The natural gas of Heathfield comes from the Lower Wealden and Purbeck Beds. Wadhurst Clay was formerly an important source of iron ore.

== Natural resources ==
Sussex's natural resources have been used for thousands of years. The South Downs includes some of Britain's earliest mines, including Church Hill, Findon which dates from around 4200BC. while the Sussex Weald was historically the centre of England's iron industry, using iron ore in the form of siderite. The Wealden iron industry was established before the Roman invasion and was superseded in the 18th century by coal areas of Wales and northern England. There remains a long-established deep-mining operation centred on the High Weald village of Brightling, the country's largest resource of calcium sulphate or gypsum. Used primarily to make plaster, plasterboard and cement, gypsum has been excavated in the area since the 1880s.

In the 21st century, there has been oil drilling at Singleton, in the South Downs north of Chichester as well as Baxters Copse and Storrington in the Low Weald. With some controversy locally, hydraulic fracturing of shale gas has been proposed to be taken from the Low Weald near Balcombe close to the Brighton Main Line railway. A proposed wind farm off just 10 miles off the Sussex coast called Rampion, named by E.ON after the county flower for Sussex, would according to E.ON, deliver 450MW of electricity.

== Major towns and cities ==
Sussex's population is dominated by the Brighton/Worthing/Littlehampton conurbation which with a population of over 460,000 is home to almost 1 in 3 of Sussex's population. According to the ONS urban area populations for continuous built-up areas, these are the 5 largest conurbations (population figures from the 2001 census):

| Rank | Urban Area | Population (2001 Census) | Localities | Comments |
|---|---|---|---|---|
| 1 | Brighton/Worthing/Littlehampton | 461,181 | 10 | Sometimes referred to as two primary urban areas – Brighton Urban Area and Worthing Urban Area |
| 2 | Crawley | 180,177 | 6 | Includes approx. 74,000 people living in Surrey |
| 3 | Hastings/Bexhill | 126,386 | 2 | |
| 4 | Eastbourne | 106,562 | 1 | |
| 5 | Bognor Regis | 62,141 | 1 | |

The largest towns and cities in Sussex are as follows:

- Brighton and Hove
- Crawley
- Worthing
- Eastbourne
- Hastings
- Horsham
- Bexhill

== Physical geography ==
=== Extreme points ===
- Northernmost point – Junction of A23 London Road and Povey Cross Road, north of Gatwick Airport, Crawley, West Sussex at 51°10′1.11″N 0°10′42.39″W
- Southernmost point – Selsey Bill, West Sussex at 50°43′21.62″N 0°47′16.77″W
- Westernmost point – Stansted Park, Stoughton, West Sussex at 50°53′28.14″N 0°57′36.22″W
- Easternmost point – Denge Marsh, near Camber Sands, East Sussex at 50°56′3.41″N 0°52′12.55″E

=== Natural areas and hills ===
Natural England has identified the following seven national character areas in Sussex:

- South Coast Plain
- South Downs
- Wealden Greensand
- Low Weald
- High Weald
- Pevensey Levels
- Romney Marshes

At 280m Blackdown is the highest point in Sussex, or county top. Ditchling Beacon (248m) is the highest point in East Sussex. Sussex's second highest point and the highest point in Sussex on the South Downs is Crown Tegleaze at 255m tall. Sussex contains seven Marilyns, that is peaks that have 150m or more of relative height.: Blackdown, Ditchling Beacon, Crowborough Beacon (242m), Chanctonbury Hill (240m), Firle Beacon (217m), Wilmington Hill (214m) and Cliffe Hill (164m).

==== Coastal plain ====
This is a fertile narrow belt from Chichester to Brighton. Once noted for market gardening, it is now heavily built up into a sprawling coastal conurbation. The beaches along the coast vary from sandy to shingle: that factor, together with the mild climate of the coast, sheltered by the hills from north and east winds, has resulted in the growth of numerous resort towns, of which the most popular are (east to west) Brighton, Shoreham-by-Sea, Worthing, Littlehampton and Bognor Regis.

==== South Downs ====
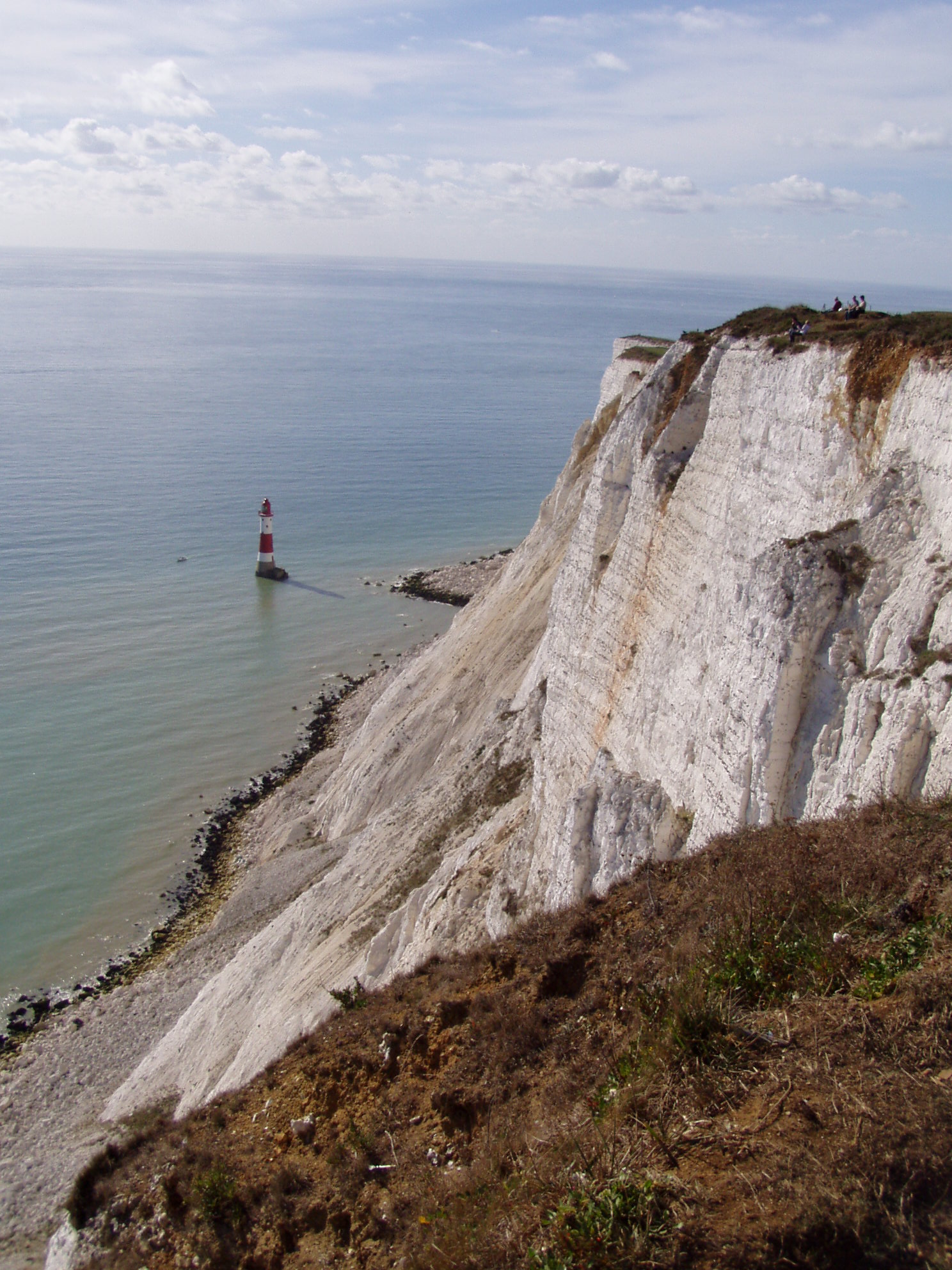
The lighthouse under Beachy Head

The South Downs start from a point near Petersfield in Hampshire. On entering Sussex, their summit is about 10 miles (16 km) from the sea. They run east for some 50 miles (80 km), gradually approaching the coast, and terminating in the bold promontory of Beachy Head near Eastbourne. Their average height is about 152 metres (499 ft) though Ditchling Beacon is 248 metres (814 ft) (the third highest summit) and many other summits exceed 212 metres (696 ft).

==== The Weald ====
The Weald is what remains of the vast forest that existed between the North and South Downs. It can be split into three parts, the High Weald, the Low Weald and the Greensand Ridge. The High Weald runs in an easterly direction from St Leonard's Forest, south-west of Crawley, and continues to Ashdown Forest. Its eastern extremity is in two sections, divided by the River Rother valley. The northern arm reaches the sea at Folkestone (in Kent); the southern at Fairlight Down east of Hastings.

Within the Weald lies Sussex's highest point, the pine-clad Black Down, close to the Surrey border at 280 metres (920 ft). Another high point is in the part called Forest Ridges: a height of 242 metres (794 ft) is reached at Beacon Hill in the neighbourhood of Crowborough.

The Weald gets its name from the Old English weald, meaning "forest". The High Weald has the greatest amount of ancient woodland in any AONB, representing 7% of all the ancient woodland in England. Around 1660 the total area under forest was estimated to exceed 200,000 acres (81,000 ha), and charcoal from the woodlands supplied the furnaces and forges of the ironworks which formed an important industry in the county until the 17th century, and which survived even until the early years of the 19th century.

==== Marshland ====
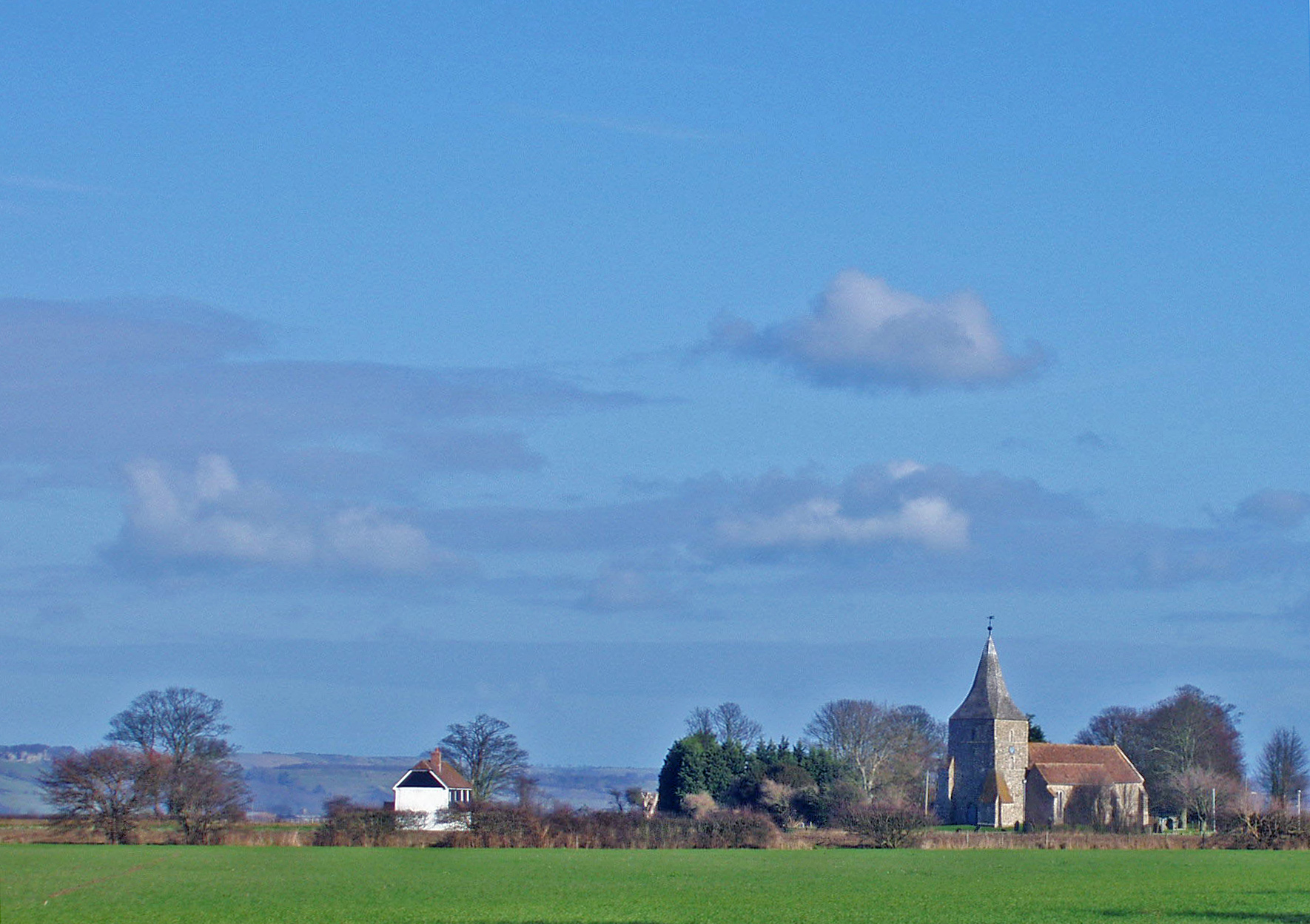
St Mary in the Marsh in Romney Marsh

There are several areas of low-lying marshland along the coast; from west to east these are:

- in the west of the county, south of Chichester, between Chichester Harbour and Pagham Harbour;
- beyond Beachy Head, the "Pevensey Levels";
- beyond Hastings, the "Pett Levels";
- beyond Rye, the "Walland Marsh" part of Romney Marsh.

All were originally bays; natural coastal deposition and man-made protective walls have given rise to alluvial deposition.

=== Islands ===
Sussex has two islands, both of which are located in Chichester Harbour. Thorney Island and neighbouring Pilsey Island. Thorney Island is separated from the mainland by a narrow channel called the Great Deep, while Pilsey Island has in recent years it has become joined to Thorney by accumulating sand.

=== Rivers ===
Sussex has rivers that flow into both the English Channel and the Thames Estuary of the North Sea. Flowing to the English Channel are the Arun, Adur, Ouse, Cuckmere and Rother. Flowing to the Thames Estuary and the North Sea are the Mole and Medway. At 113 kilometres (70 mi) long, the River Medway is the longest river flowing through Sussex. The longest river entirely in Sussex is the River Arun, which is 60 kilometres (37 mi) long.

The rivers wholly within the county are relatively short. All Sussex's rivers rise in the Weald, with the Arun, the western branch of the Adur, the Mole and the Ouse all rising in the area of St Leonard's Forest. Most of the county's rivers flow either southwards or northwards. Exceptions are the western River Rother and the eastern River Rother which each flow in an easterly direction. Many of the county's rivers are supplemented by winterbournes which in particular rise in the chalk of the South Downs. Some of the rivers flowing to the English Channel use gaps in the South Downs to do so. The mouths of all have been affected by longshore drift, particularly during violent storms during the Middle Ages.

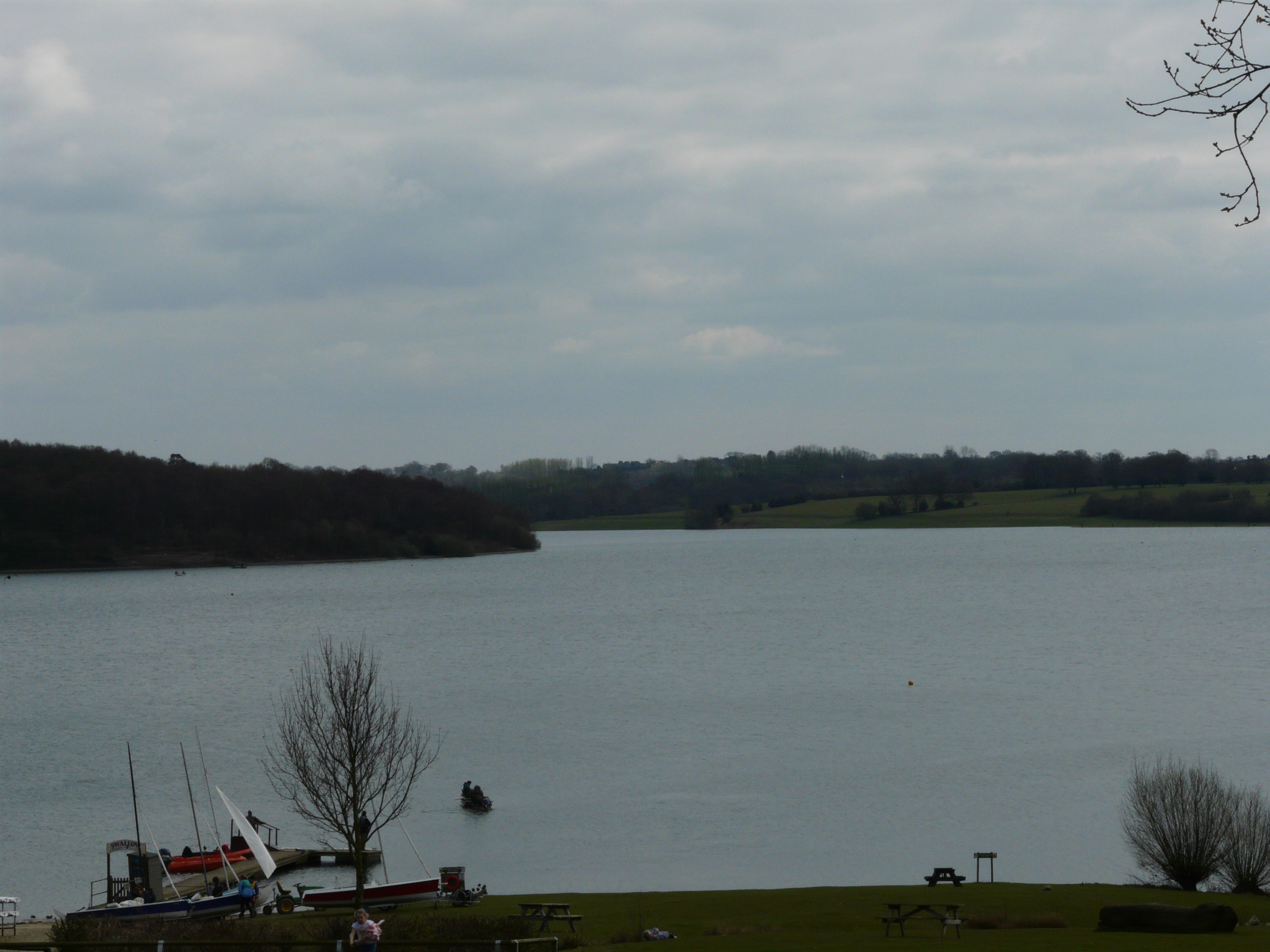
Bewl Water on the Sussex-Kent border is the largest body of water in south-east England

Rivers flowing southwards towards the English Channel from west to east are:

- Ems - a small river which forms part of Sussex's western boundary with Hampshire
- Lavant - called a river but really a winterbourne, flowing from East Dean to Chichester Harbour
- Arun, and its tributary the western River Rother: source of Arun near Horsham; entering the sea at Littlehampton
- Adur: source near Cuckfield; mouth near Shoreham-by-Sea
- Ouse: source near Lower Beeding; mouth at Newhaven
- Cuckmere: rising near Heathfield; mouth Cuckmere Haven between Eastbourne and Seaford
- Eastern River Rother and its many tributaries including the Rivers Brede and Tillingham; source, Rotherfield in the High Weald and enters the sea at Rye Bay. A section known as the Kent Ditch forms part of Sussex's eastern boundary with Kent.

=== Coastline ===
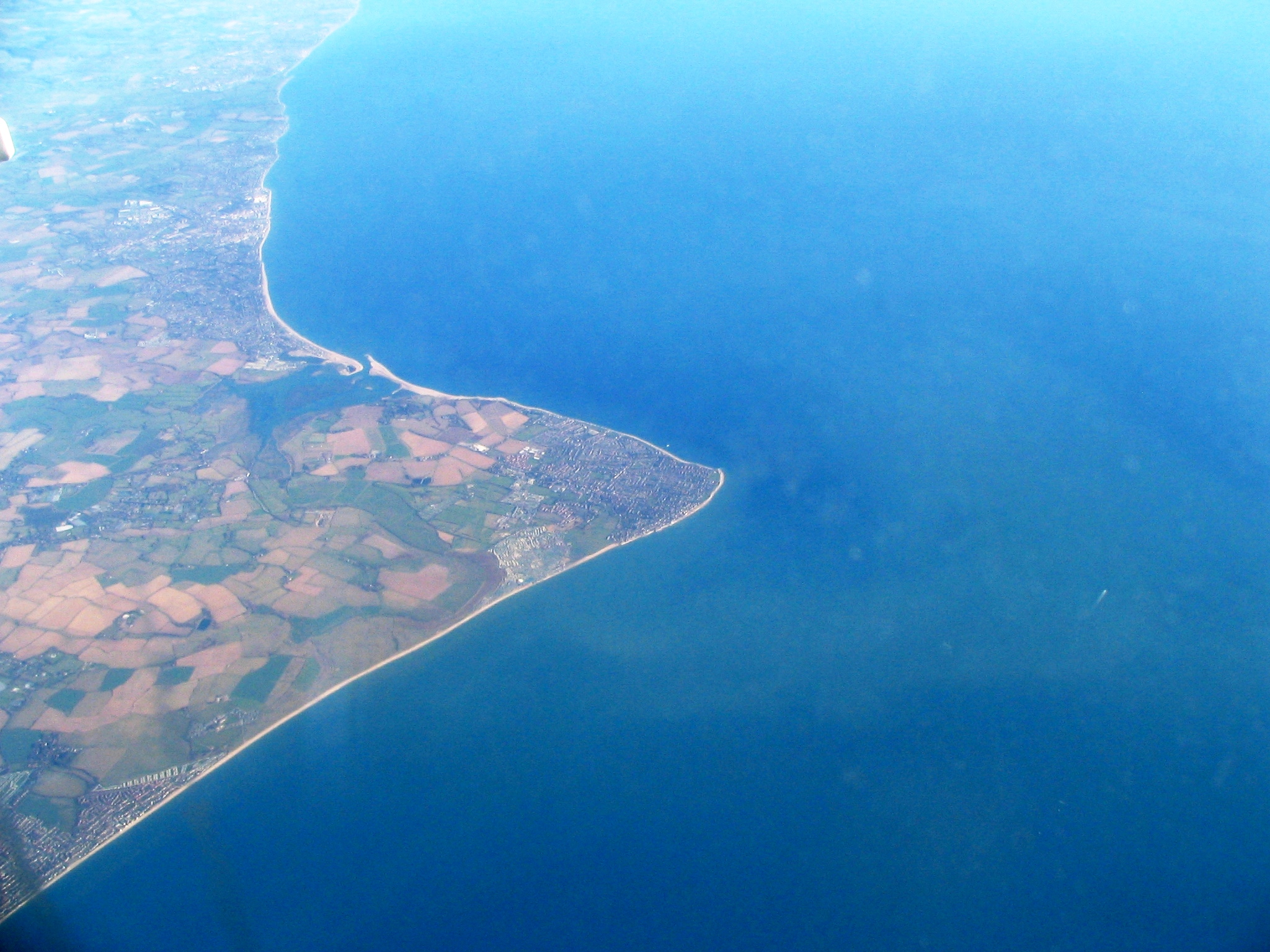
The Manhood peninsula, with Selsey Bill at its most southerly point.

Geographically a ria, Chichester Harbour in the west has some of Sussex's least developed coastline. To its east lies the Manhood Peninsula, with Selsey Bill at its southern tip. The 73 km (45 mi) bay east of Selsey Bill up to Beachy Head is sometimes known as the Bay of Sussex. To the east of the Manhood peninsula lies Pagham Harbour. East of Pagham the coastline becomes more open until the man-made Shoreham Harbour. At Brighton the coastal plain is replaced by chalk cliffs which culminate in the Seven Sisters and the promontory of Beachy Head. The Pevensey Levels and a small area of flat coastline west of Hastings separate the cliffs of Beachy Head from the cliffs east of Hastings. West of Hastings at Bulverhythe and periodically exposed lies the remains of a submerged submarine forest, known locally as 'Moon Shore'.

=== Largest lakes and reservoirs ===
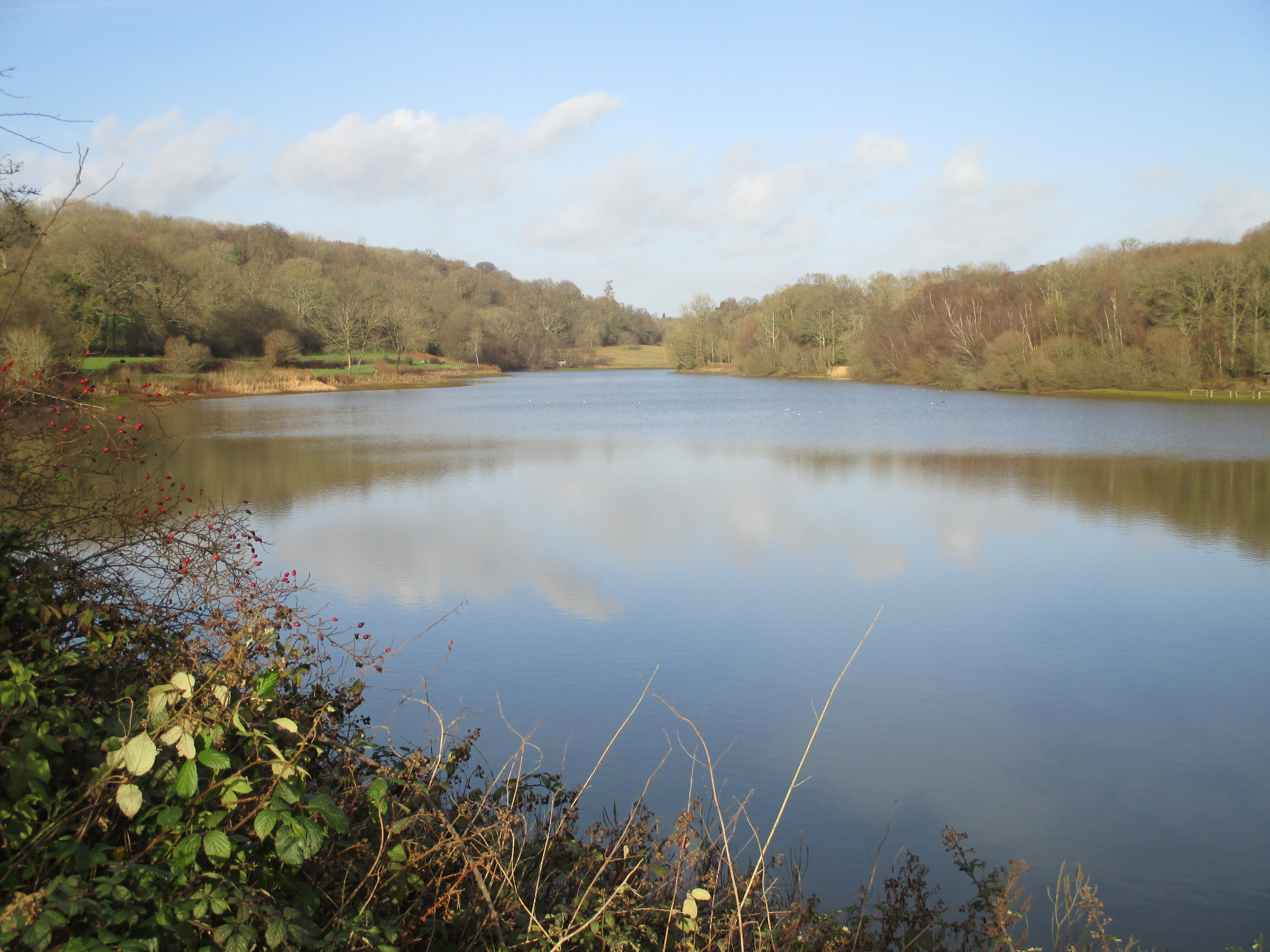
Ardingly Reservoir

Sussex's largest lakes are man-made reservoirs. The largest is Bewl Water on the Kent border, while the largest wholly within Sussex is Ardingly Reservoir. Darwell Reservoir, Powdermill Reservoir and Weir Wood Reservoir are all larger than 5 hectares.

=== Marine environment ===
Sussex's offshore environment includes such varied features as the Shoal of the Lead 8 kilometres (5.0 mi) south of Selsey Bill where the seabed drops steeply to 67 metres (220 ft) causing strong underwater cascades, a feature which may be unique to the British Isles. There are sandstone reefs and caves. The Mixon Hole is a clay cliff which extends some 30 metres (98 ft) down and contains unusual plant assemblages and a rare combination of species which only occur there, while the Worthing Lumps are considered some of Europe's finest chalk reefs.

=== Protected areas ===
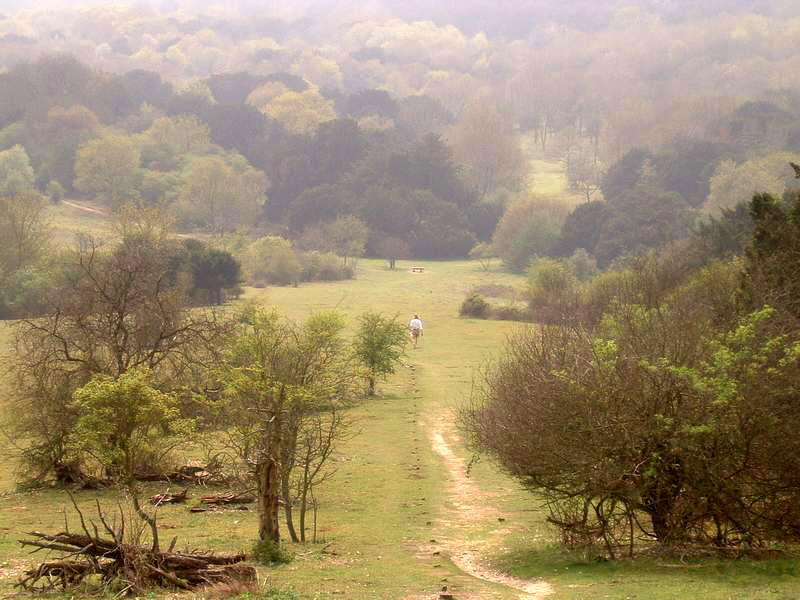
Kingley Vale National Nature Reserve

Sussex contains one national park, the South Downs National Park (shared with Hampshire) and two Areas of Outstanding Natural Beauty, the High Weald AONB and the Chichester Harbour AONB. The cliffs on the coast between Seaford and Eastbourne known as the Seven Sisters have been designated as the Sussex Heritage Coast.

As of 2012 Sussex had 11 internationally important Special Areas of Conservation. These areas include Ebernoe Common which is considered the best site for bats in Western Europe. Two further sites in Sussex are being considered as candidate SACs: The Arun Valley and the Pevensey Levels are two of four UK sites for the endangered Little Whirlpool Ram's-Horn Snail (Anisus vorticulus).

Sussex is also home to six national nature reserves including Kingley Vale National Nature Reserve, one of Natural England's 'spotlight' reserves. The Sussex Wildlife Trust manages over 30 nature reserves across Sussex. with an area of over 1,800 hectares (4,400 acres).

Sussex has various marine Sites of Nature Conservation Importance (mSNCIs) and may be the only region of the UK to have this marine SNCIs.

In 2014 UNESCO made Brighton and Hove and the area between the rivers Adur and Ouse the world's first urban biosphere reserve.

== Biodiversity ==
=== Flora ===
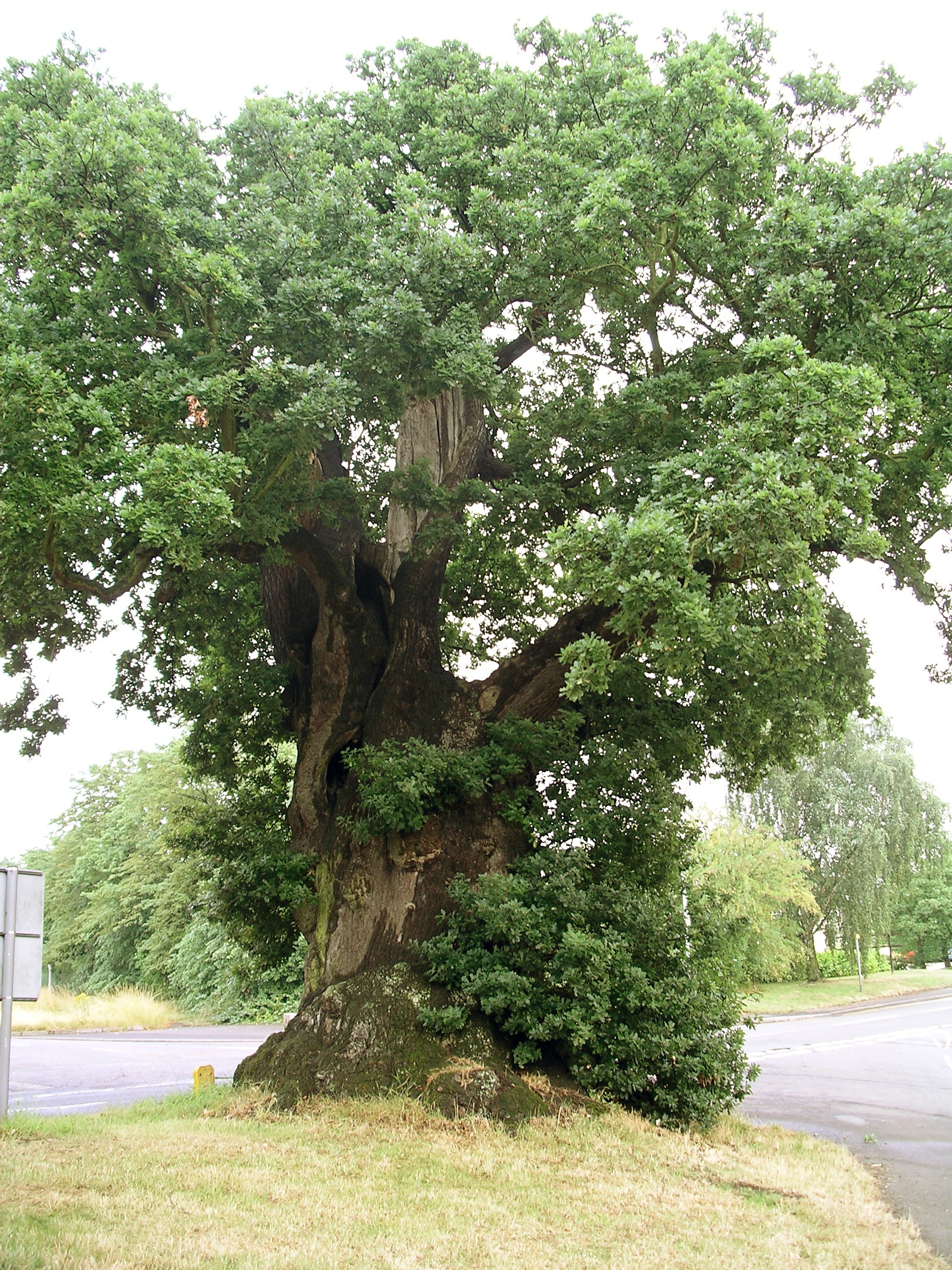
Oak trees were once thought to be so common in Sussex that they were nicknamed 'Sussex weed'

A range of woodland types are present in Sussex, including some nationally uncommon types. Like most of southern England, Sussex generally falls into the English Lowlands beech forests ecoregion.

Lowland Beech woodlands occur mostly on the South Downs, but are also found throughout the Weald, often in association with other woodland types. Good examples of near-natural beech woodland can be found at The Mens and Ebernoe Common in the Sussex Weald. A number of lowland mixed deciduous communities are represented in Sussex. Oak-hornbeam woodlands are typical of the Wealden clays, with Oak-hazel and rare large-leaved lime woodlands found on the western Downs. In fact, oak were once thought to be so common in Sussex that they were nicknamed as 'Sussex weed' Sweet chestnut is fairly abundant, particularly in East Sussex, and is one of the few woodland types still under active coppice management. The Black poplar is probably the rarest tree in Sussex, existing as scattered individuals. It is possible that the woodland habitat in which it would have been a constituent is now extinct in Sussex (and possibly Britain).

Sussex is also rich in gill woodlands, found in steep-sided, narrow stream valleys. They have a humid micro-climate that reflects the warm, moist Atlantic period approximately 7,000 years ago. Their characteristic flora includes lush growth of ferns, mosses and liverworts. These conditions are not found elsewhere in eastern or central Britain.

Following the loss of millions to Dutch Elm Disease, Sussex has the majority of the UK's mature English Elms.

There are several traditional Sussex varieties of apple which include Egremont Russet, Sussex Mother and Crawley Reinette

Sussex is home a large proportion of the UK's Lowland calcareous grassland, one of the richest habitats of Western Europe, containing a great diversity of plants and animals, many of which are nationally or internationally threatened. Sussex's county flower, the Round-headed Rampion (also known as the Pride of Sussex or Phyteuma orbiculare) is more common on the chalk grassland of the South Downs than anywhere else.

=== Fauna ===
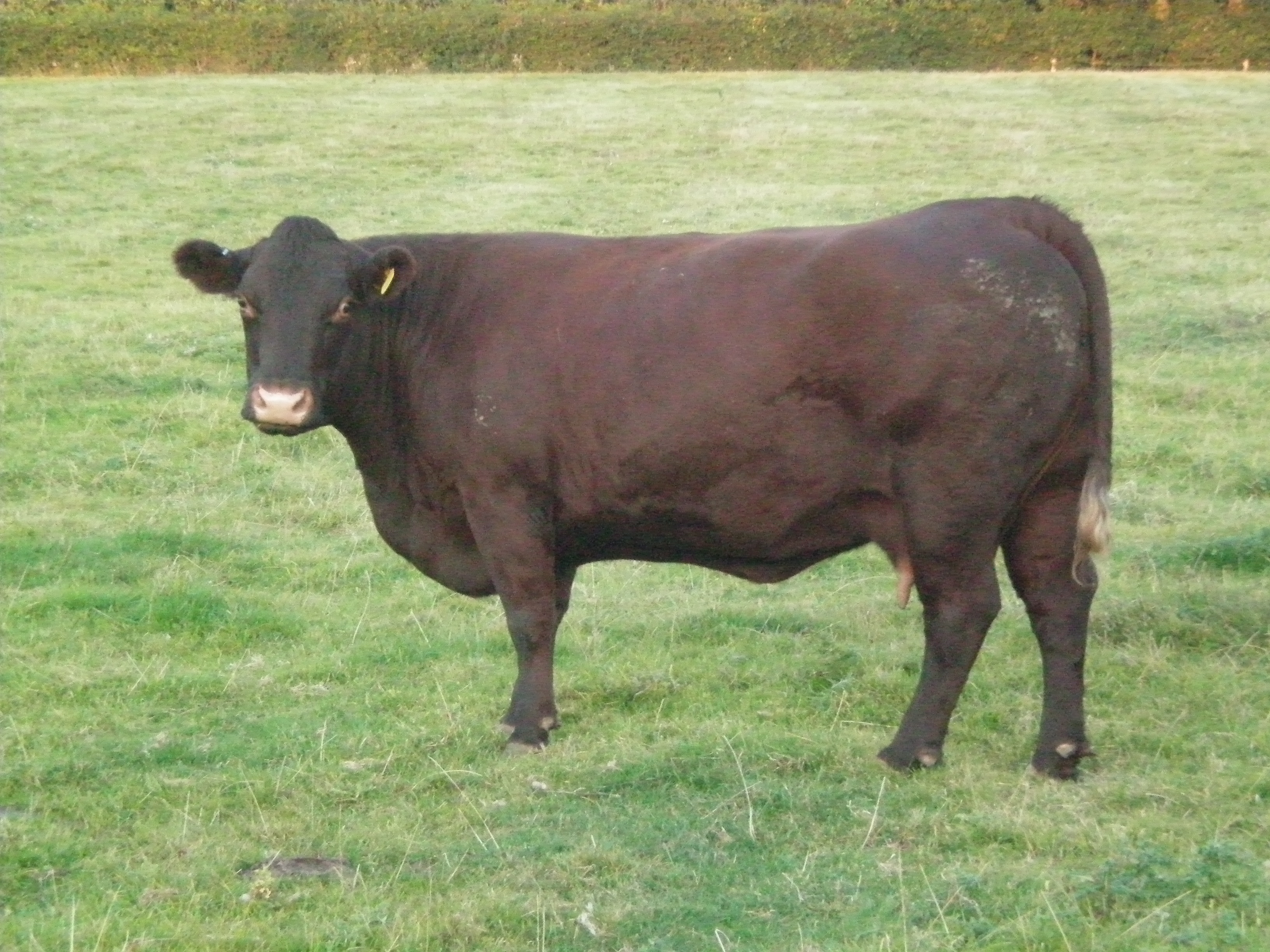
Sussex cattle are descended from oxen used in the Weald

The UK's largest population of feral wild boar are in the Weald with around 200-300 individuals living close near the East Sussex-Kent border. Otter have returned to Sussex since 2008, after having been extinct in Sussex since the 1970s. Once nicknamed 'the eagle of the South Country', peregrine falcons, were extinct in Sussex between 1945 and 1990 and have now returned to live in rural locations as well as urban sites including Chichester Cathedral and Sussex Heights, a residential tower block in Brighton. The Sussex emerald moth is now extinct from Sussex as is the Sussex wainscot moth. The sea anemone known as Ivell's sea anemone (Edwardsia ivelli) was known globally only from Widewater Lagoon in Lancing; last seen in 1983 it is thought to be extinct.

Since 2001 Knepp Wildland in the Low Weald near Horsham has been part of a major rewilding project, as of 2015 the largest rewilding project in lowland Europe. Since its inception the project has seen a spontaneous revival of many rare species. It is now a breeding hotspot for purple emperor butterflies, turtle doves and 2 per cent of the UK's population of nightingales.

Sightings continue to be reported of British big cats or phantom cat wild in Sussex.

Domesticated animals with strong Sussex links include the Southdown sheep, which was bred on the South Downs near Lewes, Sussex cattle which originate from the Weald and the Sussex chicken. The Sussex Spaniel was first developed as a breed of dog in Hastings in 1795.

The chalk reefs of the Sussex coast are home to a significant number of harpacticoid crustaceans of which some are new to science. The area off the coast of Littlehampton has been identified as a nursery and breeding ground for the black seabream.

== Human geography ==
Grant Allen argued that until the modern era, Sussex was effectively isolated from the rest of England by its geography. Before drainage and reclamation, Sussex was separated from Hampshire to the west by great tidal flats and swamps around Havant and Hayling Island. To the north, Sussex was cut off by the thick forest of the Weald, while to the east, the Pevensey Levels cut off the largest part of Sussex from the rape of Hastings. This area, before becoming part of Sussex formed the kingdom of the Haestingas. The region was isolated in a similar way with marshland of the Pevensey Levels lying to the west and the forest of the Weald to the north, while Romney Marsh separates the region from Kent to the east. According to this theory, the Sussex coastal plain and the coombes of the Downs were naturally predestined to form a single Celtic kingdom, a single Saxon principality, and a single English shire.

Culturally, Sussex historically looked in a southerly direction to the sea, rather than northwards to London. This can be deduced from a variety of sources, but perhaps the most striking are the earlier estate maps from the 17th and 18th centuries. Almost all of them place south at the top of the map, opposite to the standard convention of north-up.

=== Land use ===
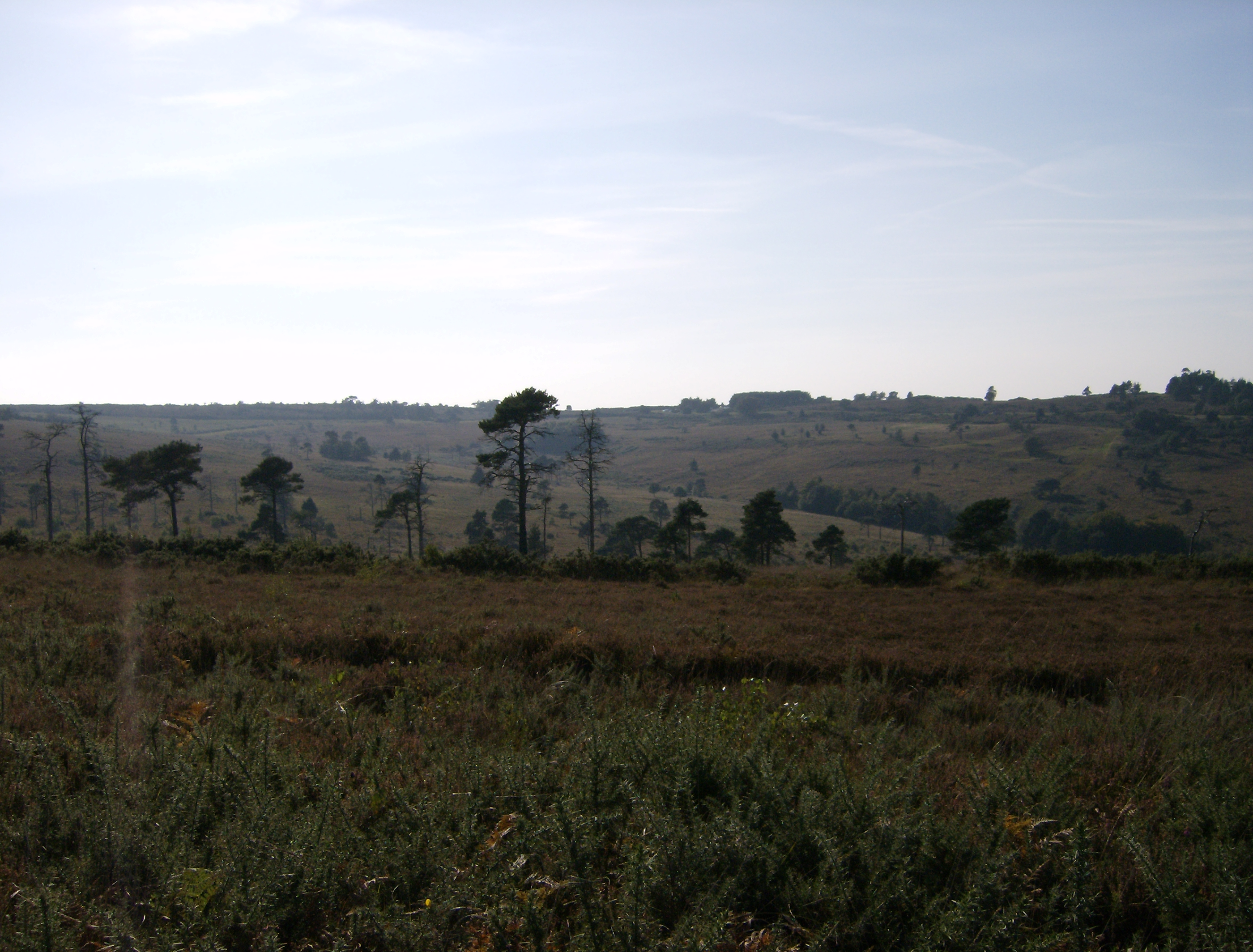
Ashdown Forest in the High Weald contains the largest area of heathland remaining in South East England.

Sussex is one of the most wooded parts of lowland Britain with the Weald having the greatest woodland cover in Britain. Sussex has over 3000 hectares of heathland, which occurs mainly on the Wealden Greensand in West Sussex and in the High Weald of East Sussex. Ashdown Forest contains the largest area of heathland remaining in South East England.

Land use in Sussex is as follows:

- Farmland - 60%
- Woodland - 17.5%
- Urban areas - 12%

=== Neighbouring counties and regions ===
Sussex has land borders with the counties of Hampshire, Surrey and Kent. The town of Boulogne-sur-Mer in Pas de Calais, France, lies approximately 38 miles (61 km) to the east of Camber Sands.

=== Economic geography ===
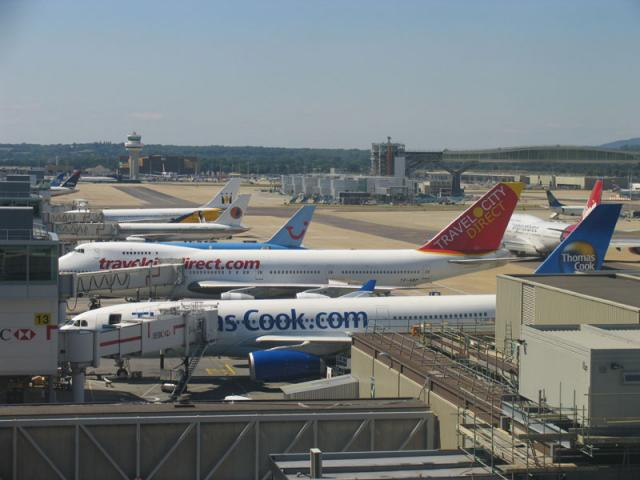
Gatwick Airport provides significant jobs and trade to the Sussex economy.

GDP per capita in Sussex and Surrey in 2009 was 16.2 per cent higher than the EU average with a total GDP of €69,349 million. Economic sub-regions within Sussex include:

- the Gatwick Diamond, an area centring on Gatwick Airport and Crawley that stretches southwards to Brighton and northwards to Croydon in south London.
- Brighton and Hove - with a high density of businesses involved in media, particularly digital or "new media", since the 1990s Brighton has been referred to as "Silicon Beach".
- Coastal West Sussex, an area extending from Chichester to Shoreham and including the urban areas of Worthing and Bognor Regis

=== Political geography ===
Formerly a Saxon kingdom, Sussex was absorbed into Wessex, becoming a county in the later kingdom of England. From at least as long ago as the Norman Conquest, and possibly originating in the Romano-British period, or perhaps representing the shires of the kingdom of Sussex, Sussex was sub-divided into territories known as 'rapes', a sub-division unique to the county. From at least the 16th century, the three eastern rapes and three western rapes were informally grouped together as Sussex's eastern and western divisions. County councils were created for East and West Sussex in 1889. In 1974 the present-day district of Mid Sussex, (a large part of the rape of Lewes) was transferred from East Sussex to West Sussex and East and West Sussex were made into separate ceremonial counties. In 1997, Brighton and Hove became a self-administered unitary authority; it was granted city status in 2000, whilst remaining part of the ceremonial county of East Sussex.

By convention Chichester is Sussex's capital city and Lewes is Sussex's county town. Chichester has been seen as the capital of Sussex since it became the political centre of the kingdom of Sussex by the 8th century. Due in part to its more central location within the county, Lewes has been the county town of Sussex since the 15th century. Both titles are honorary and there currently little administration organised on a Sussex-wide basis, since the creation of county councils for East and West Sussex in 1889. One exception is Sussex Police, and the elected position of Sussex Police and Crime Commissioner which has been based at Lewes to serve all of Sussex since its creation. Lewes is also home to Lewes Crown Court, the main crown court for Sussex and HM Prison Lewes, the local men's prison for Sussex.

Along with Kent and Surrey, Sussex is one of the most ancient surviving territories in Europe. The Sussex-Surrey border follows ridges and a trackway whereas the Sussex-Kent border follows a series of streams and rivers, including Kent Water, the River Teise, the River Bewl, Kent Ditch and the eastern River Rother. According to Mark Gardiner, the different nature of Sussex's borders with Kent and with Surrey indicate two separate and larger-scale agreements and may represent boundaries of Roman civitates or Iron Age kingdoms.

== See also ==
- Geography of England
- Sussex Border Path
- Culture of Sussex

== Footnotes ==
Notes

== Bibliography ==
- Bosworth, George F. (2012). Sussex — Cambridge County Geographies. Cambridge University Press. ISBN 9781107646339.
- Brandon, Peter (2006). Sussex. London: Phillimore. ISBN 978-0-7090-6998-0.
- Ewald, Alex Charles, ed. (1870). A Reference-Book of Modern Geography. London: Longmans, Green and Co.
- Lower, Mark Antony (1834). Sussex; being an historical, topographical, and general description of every rape, hundred, river, town, borough, parish, village, hamlet, castle, monastery, and gentleman's seat in that county, etc. Brighton: E. Taylor.

(See pp. 165–166.)
