= Urban biosphere reserve =

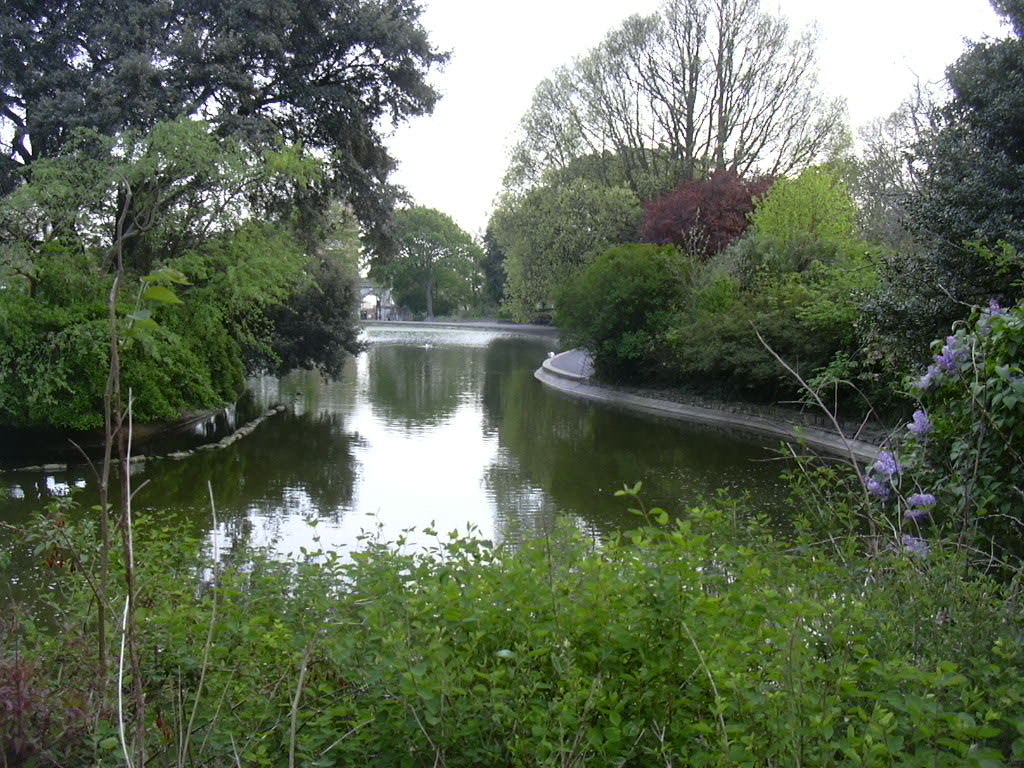
The Queen's Park of Brighton

An urban biosphere reserve is an attempt to apply the biosphere reserve concept to urban areas by the MAB Programme of UNESCO. Through urban planning and ecosystem management, an urban biosphere reserve is expected to support sustainable development and conservation. Brighton and Hove is bidding to become the world's first urban biosphere reserve.

The need for urban biosphere reserves has arisen as the number of people living in the world's cities has reached three billion, nearly half of the total population. By 2050 two-thirds of the total population will be living in cities. The rapid expansion of the cities and of their populations poses a challenge for a viable global environment. Although some of the existing biosphere reserves include cities and towns, entirely urban-oriented biosphere reserves have yet to be included in the list.

== Working definition ==
A possible working definition for urban biosphere reserve has been proposed:

a Biosphere Reserve characterized by important urban areas within or adjacent to its boundaries where the natural, socio-economic and cultural environments are shaped by urban influences and pressures, and set up and managed to mitigate these pressures for improved urban and regional sustainability.

Three main functions are expected from an urban biosphere reserve. They are conservation, development and logistic support. It is expected that an urban biosphere reserve would contribute to conservation of its landscape and ecosystem, and foster both economical and cultural development. It is also expected that it would support demonstration projects, environmental education and training, and research on sustainable development issues.

== Initiatives ==
Brighton and Hove is one of many cities around the world that have taken steps towards this concept. Mornington Peninsula of Melbourne is endorsed by the Government of Victoria for submission as a biosphere reserve. New York City, Seoul, São Paulo and Cape Town have adopted different urban ecology initiatives. It is suggested that, because of the cultural and ecological values of Kandy, it should be given consideration of becoming the first urban biosphere reserve in Sri Lanka.

== Outcomes ==
The Brighton and Lewes Downs Biosphere Reserve, incorporating both chalk downland and the urban area of Brighton and Hove, was established in 2014.
