= South Coast Plain =

- Region
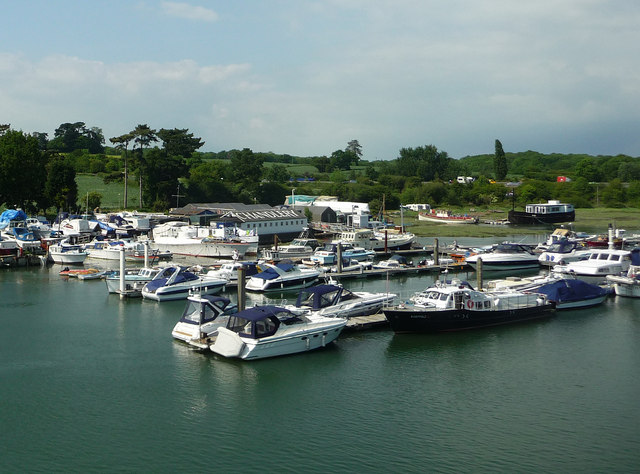
- River Hamble
- Interactive map of South Coast Plain
- Coordinates: 50°50′N 0°40′W
- Country: England
- Region: Hampshire, Sussex

Area
  - Total: 522.45 km^{2} (201.72 sq mi)

Population (2001)
  - Total: 505,822
  - Density: 968.17/km^{2} (2,507.6/sq mi)

The South Coast Plain is a natural region in England running along the central south coast in the counties of East and West Sussex and Hampshire.

It has been designated as National Character Area No. 126 by Natural England. The NCA has a total area of 52,245 hectares and forms a coastal strip, 2 to 16 kilometres wide, running from the area of Hamble-le-Rice in Hampshire in the west across the entire length of West Sussex to Brighton in East Sussex to the east.

Its major settlements include the cities of Brighton and Hove, Chichester and Portsmouth, the market town of Fareham, the coastal town of Gosport and the seaside resorts of Bognor Regis, Littlehampton and Worthing. It is bordered by the New Forest across Southampton Water to the west, the South Hampshire Lowlands to the northwest, the South Downs to the north and east, and the Isle of Wight across the Solent to the southwest.

== See also ==
- Geography of Sussex
