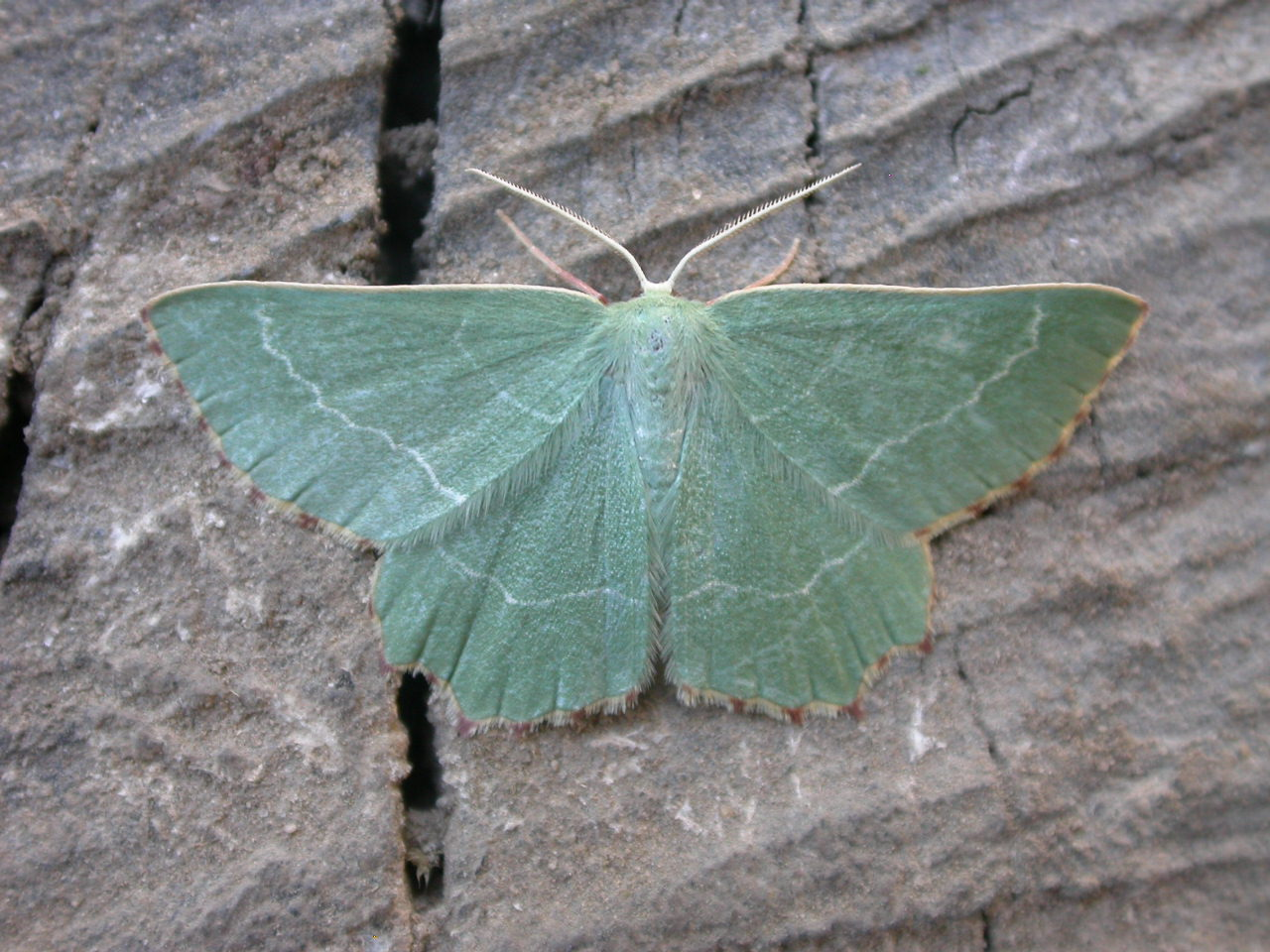
- Thalera fimbrialis

Scientific classification
- Kingdom: Animalia
- Phylum: Arthropoda
- Clade: Pancrustacea
- Class: Insecta
- Order: Lepidoptera
- Family: Geometridae
- Tribe: Hemitheini
- Genus: Thalera; Hübner, [1823]

Synonyms
- Hethemia Ferguson, 1969

= Thalera =

Genus of moths

Thalera is a genus of moths in the family Geometridae erected by Jacob Hübner in 1823.

== Description ==
Palpi minute and hardly reaching beyond the frons. Antennae of male bipectinate (comb like on both sides) usually to apex. Forewings with vein 3 from near angle of cell. Veins 7, 8, 9 and 10 stalked and vein 11 anastomosing (fusing) with vein 12 and then with vein 10. Hindwings with frenulum absent. The outer margin angled at vein 4. Veins 6 and 7 absent.

== Species ==
- Thalera aeruginata Warren, 1893
- Thalera chosensis Bryk, 1948
- Thalera chlorosaria Graeser, 1890
- Thalera fimbrialis Scopoli, 1763 - Sussex emerald
- Thalera lacerataria Graeser, 1888
- Thalera pistasciaria (Guenée, 1857)
- Thalera prouti Thierry-Mieg, 1913
- Thalera rubrifimbria Inoue, 1990
- Thalera suavis (Swinhoe, 1902)
