= Ebernoe =

Village and parish in West Sussex, England

Coordinates: 51.04°N 0.61°W

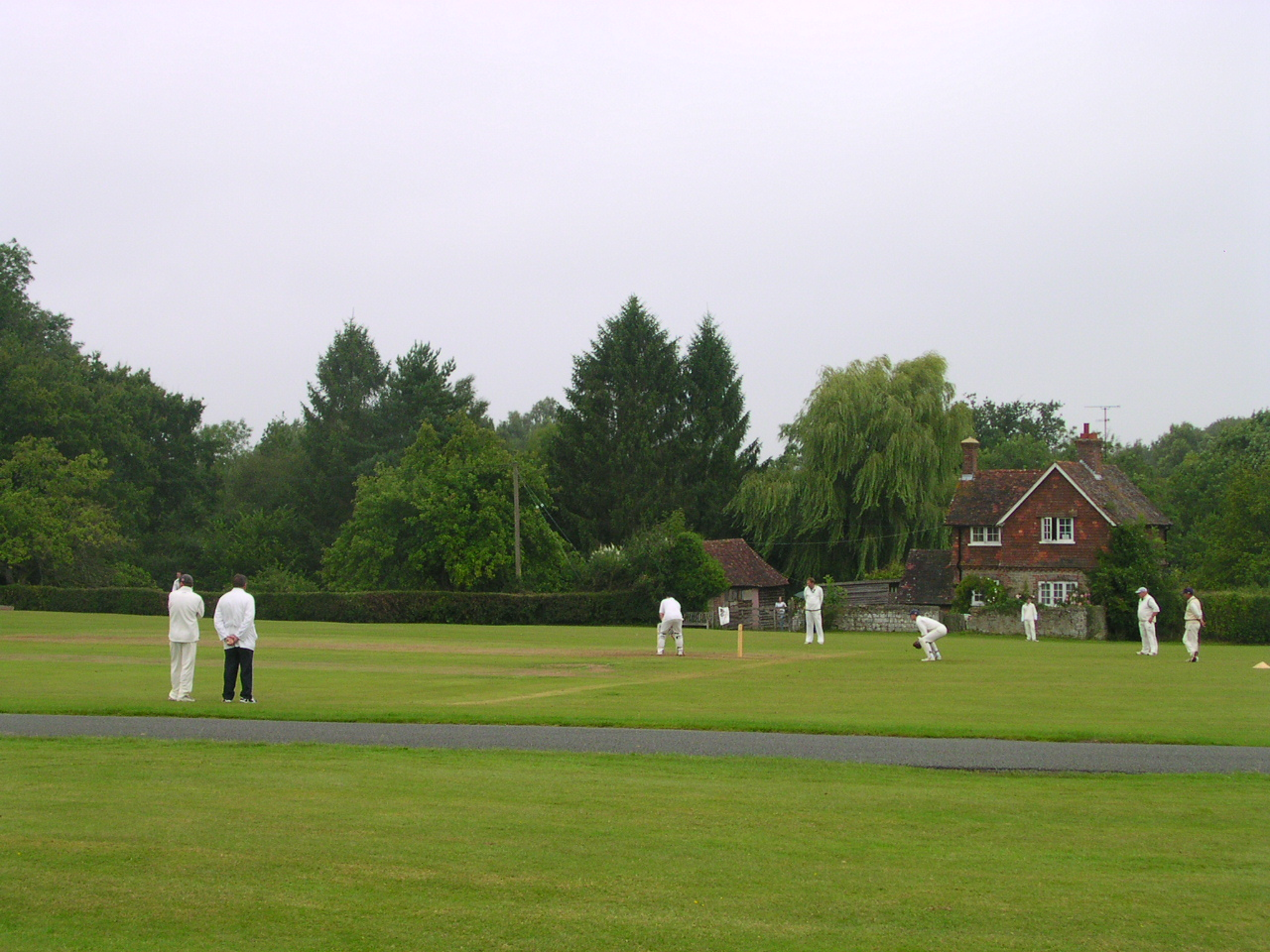
- Cricket on Horn Fair day

- Location within West Sussex
- Area: 12.39 km^{2} (4.78 sq mi)
- Population: 213 2011 Census
  - Density: 19/km^{2} (49/sq mi)
- OS grid reference: SU974279
  - London: 31 miles (50 km) NE
- Civil parish: Ebernoe
- District: Chichester
- Shire county: West Sussex
- Region: South East
- Country: England
- Sovereign state: United Kingdom
- Post town: PETWORTH
- Postcode district: GU28
- Dialling code: 01784
- Police: Sussex
- Fire: West Sussex
- Ambulance: South East Coast
- UK Parliament: Arundel and South Downs

Ebernoe is a hamlet and civil parish in the District of Chichester in West Sussex, England, and 4 miles (6 km) north of Petworth near the A283 road.

The parish has a land area of 3,060 acres (1,238 ha). In the 2001 census 234 people lived in 102 households of whom 107 were economically active. The 2011 Census indicated a population of 213.

Hidden from the road by trees is the Anglican parish church, built from locally made brick in the nineteenth century. Walled to exclude rabbits the churchyard is a haven for wild flowers. Adjoining the church there is another old building, the Old Schoolhouse.

There is a cricket field where the village team plays and through which a road runs. This is also the venue for the Ebernoe Horn Fair held every 25 July.

== Landmarks ==
Ebernoe Common is a national nature reserve and Site of Special Scientific Interest managed by the Sussex Wildlife Trust. Among its ancient woodland, glades and ponds it supports a diversity of plants and animals, including 14 out of 16 species of bat which occur in the UK, including the rare Bechstein's and Barbastelle bats. Adjoining farmland has been purchased with a grant from Restore UK which will be allowed to revert to pasture woodland over a long period with managed grazing by cattle.

The Barbastelle bats need old dying trees with loose bark for their roosts and travel great distances along traditional flight lines to feed over damp meadows, which may be as much as 20 kilometres from the roost, in the Arun and Rother valleys. Local landowners are being encouraged to maintain and enhance continuous tree cover along these routes so that the bats can travel out on summer evenings avoiding predation by sparrow hawks.

The ponds on the common were constructed for the iron industry and there is also an old brick works which is thought to have been supplying bricks to Petworth House. Ebernoe Furnace Pond was established in 1594 by the Smythes of Wassell to make pig iron for Wassell Forge, at Kirdford. The waters are hidden in woodland on the large Ebernoe Common, an ancient woodland and nature reserve managed by the Sussex Wildlife Trust.

Wassell Mill was formerly a corn-mill and prior to the mid-17th century was a forge for iron working. A stream was dammed to give water power and this arrangement was visible in the area in 1980s, although the water-wheel itself was missing. A short distance from Wassell Mill is a house called Little Wassel, which is believed to have been the miller's house until 1843, when corn milling ceased.
