= Red Poll =

Dual-purpose cattle breed

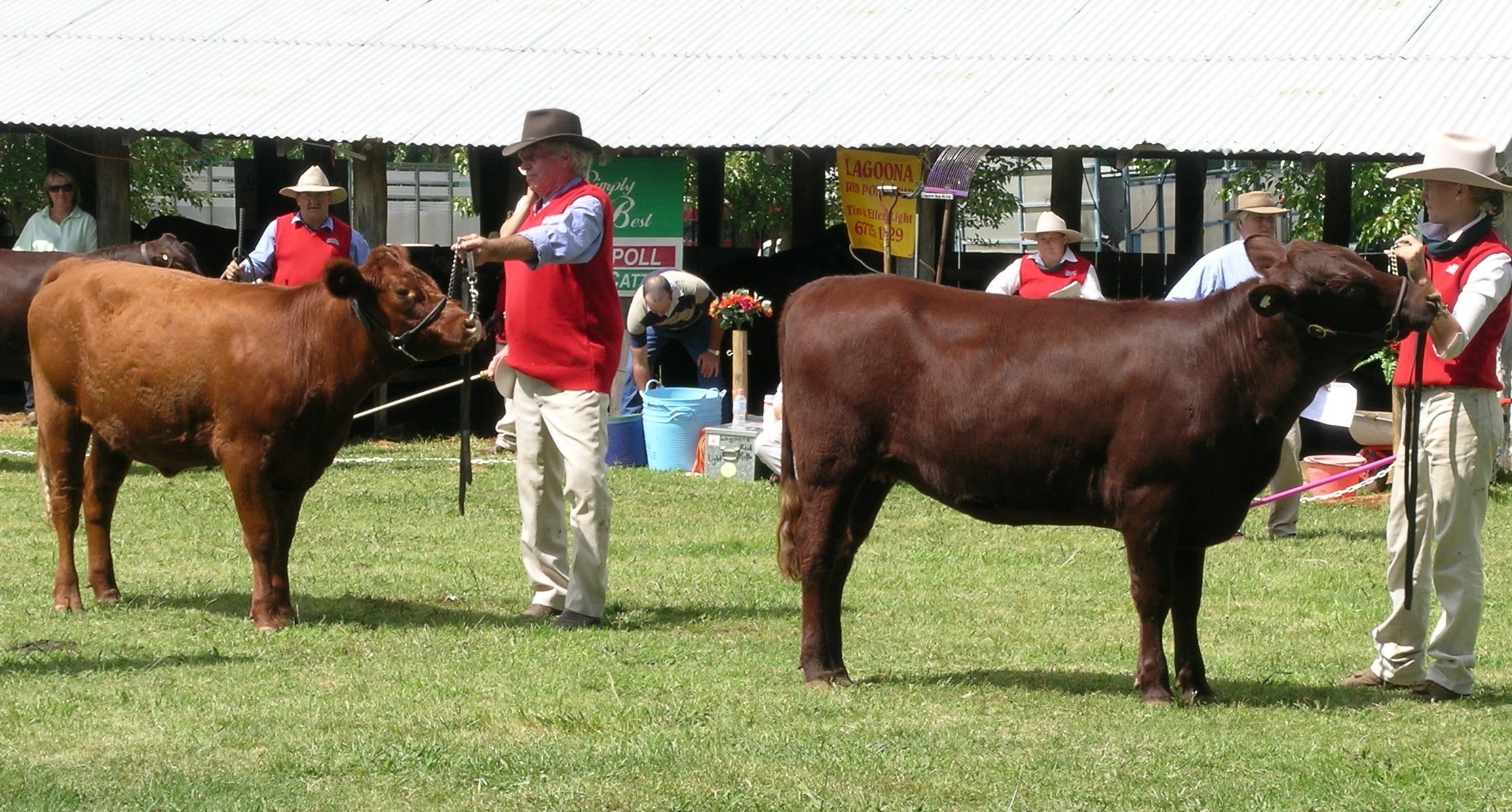
Red Poll heifers at the Walcha Show, New South Wales, Australia

The Red Poll is a dual-purpose breed of cattle developed in England in the latter half of the 19th century. The Red Poll is a cross of the Norfolk Red beef cattle and Suffolk Dun dairy cattle breeds.

== Description and uses ==
The cattle are red, preferably deep red with white only on the tail switch and udder. They are naturally polled (without horns). Red Poll cattle are mainly used as beef suckler cows, although a few dairy herds are found in England, as well as in the United States in the state of Texas. They are known for easy calving and successfully rearing a high proportion of their calves. They are sometimes used for conservation grazing.

== History ==
The Red Poll originated as a cross between Norfolk Red beef-type cattle and Suffolk Dun dairy cattle (both of these breeds are now extinct). The parent Suffolk breed was also polled; Norfolk cattle had horns, but the gene for horns was bred out in the Red Poll breed. The original name for the breed, adopted in 1863, was Norfolk and Suffolk Red Polled cattle, and the first standard description was agreed upon in 1873, with the first herd book compiled in 1874. The breed became the Red Polled in 1883, and then Red Poll in 1888, when the Red Poll Cattle Society was formed.

They are considered to be part of the "Suffolk Trinity" with Suffolk sheep and Suffolk Punch heavy horses.

Red Poll cattle were imported into Australia in the mid-19th century, where they are now used for beef production. The first identified breeder in Australia was James Graves, around 1870, although there is evidence of earlier herds.

These cattle were introduced to the United States by G. P. Taber of New York State in 1873. The Red Poll dual-purpose bred is the oldest registered breed in the United States and is celebrating its 125th year. The breed is beginning to be reintroduced into some areas of the western US for the small ranch and backyard beef and 4H, as their docile nature makes them easy for the novice to handle. In 2010, Pfizer Animal Health testing of a Red Polled Bull Power Hawk tested a minus -2.58 MVP showing he was in top 1% for feed efficiency indicating Red Poll Cattle have genetics to improve feed efficiency that is important to profitability and grass finishing ability in a moderate frame. Feed testing of steers averaged 2.88 weaning to slaughter for a small Washington feeder in 2012.

The Red Poll breed was first brought to New Zealand in 1898, but a herd was not established until 1917, when 22 animals were transported from Australia.

== See also ==
- Senepol, a hybrid with African N'Dama cattle originating in the Virgin Islands
- Sussex cattle, a horned red beef breed from the south east of England
- North Devon cattle, a horned red beef breed from Devon, Somerset and Cornwall
- Lincoln Red, a horned red breed from Lincolnshire
