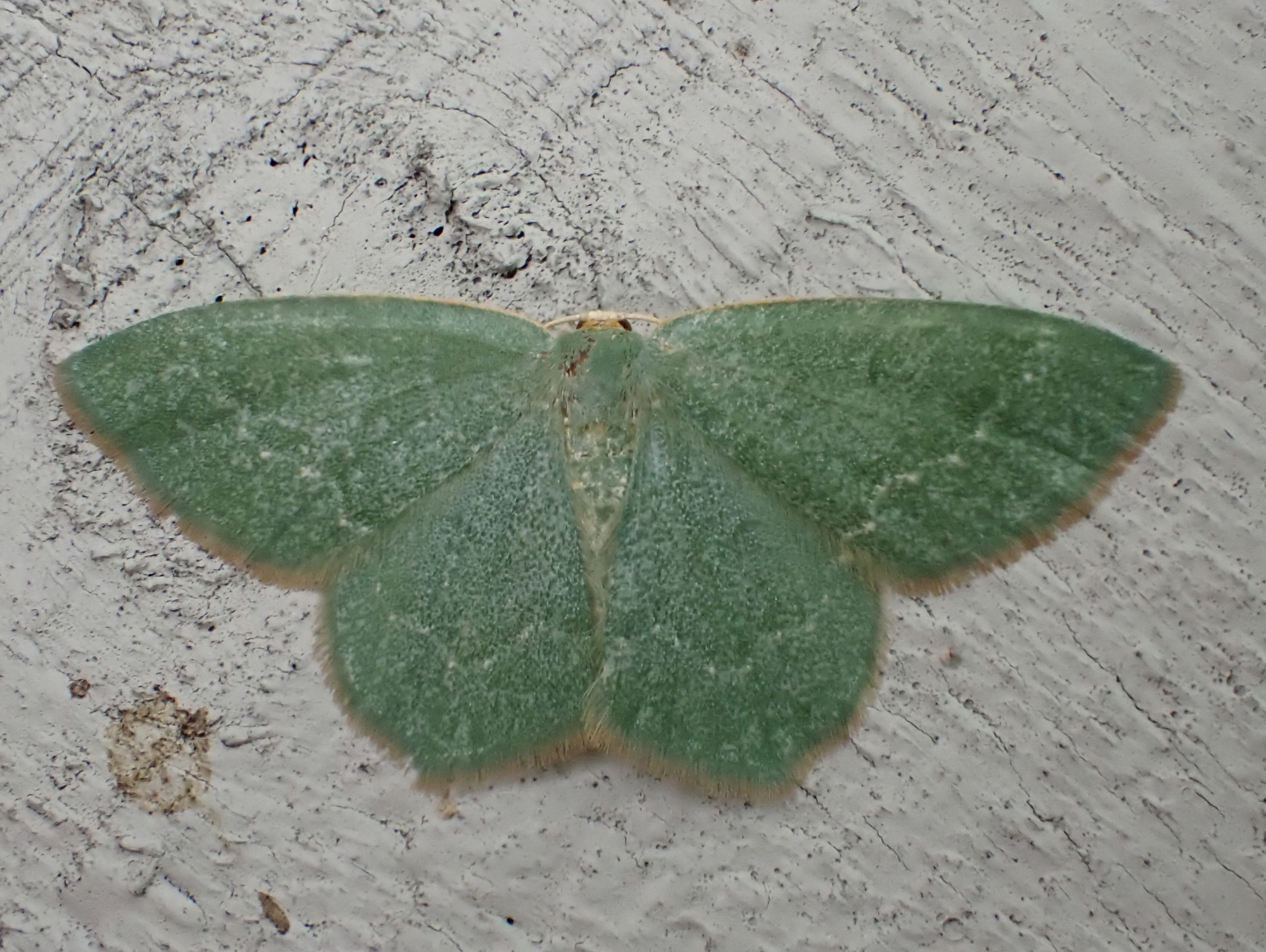

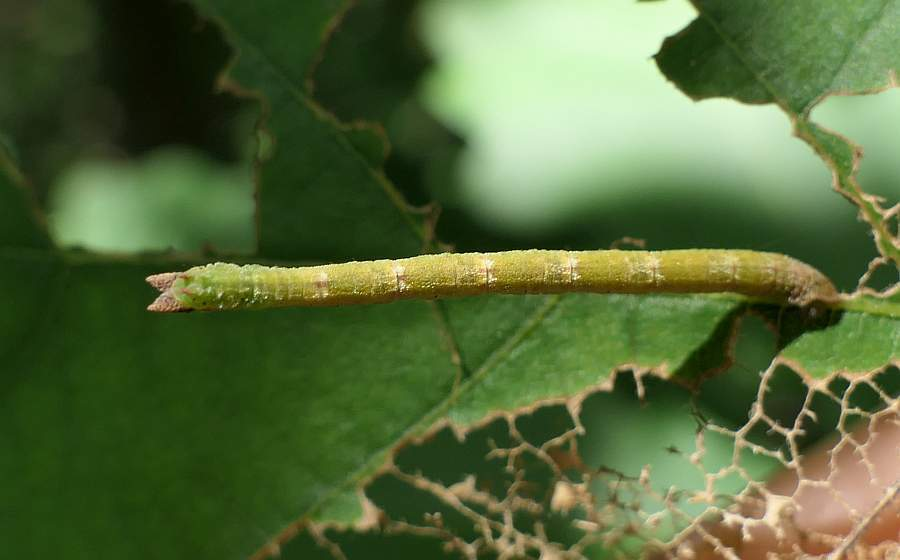
- Adult (top) and larva (bottom)

Scientific classification
- Kingdom: Animalia
- Phylum: Arthropoda
- Clade: Pancrustacea
- Class: Insecta
- Order: Lepidoptera
- Family: Geometridae
- Genus: Thalera
- Species: T. pistasciaria

Binomial name
- Thalera pistasciaria (Guenée, 1857)

Synonyms
- Hethemia pistasciaria Guenée, 1857; Nemoria pistasciaria Guenée, 1857

= Thalera pistasciaria =

Genus of moths

Thalera pistasciaria is a species of moth in the family Geometridae. It was first described by Achille Guenée in 1857 and has been found in eastern and central North America from Nova Scotia to Manitoba, and south to South Carolina and Alabama.
