= Ardingly Reservoir =

Reservoir in West Sussex, England

Coordinates: 51.049°N 0.105°W

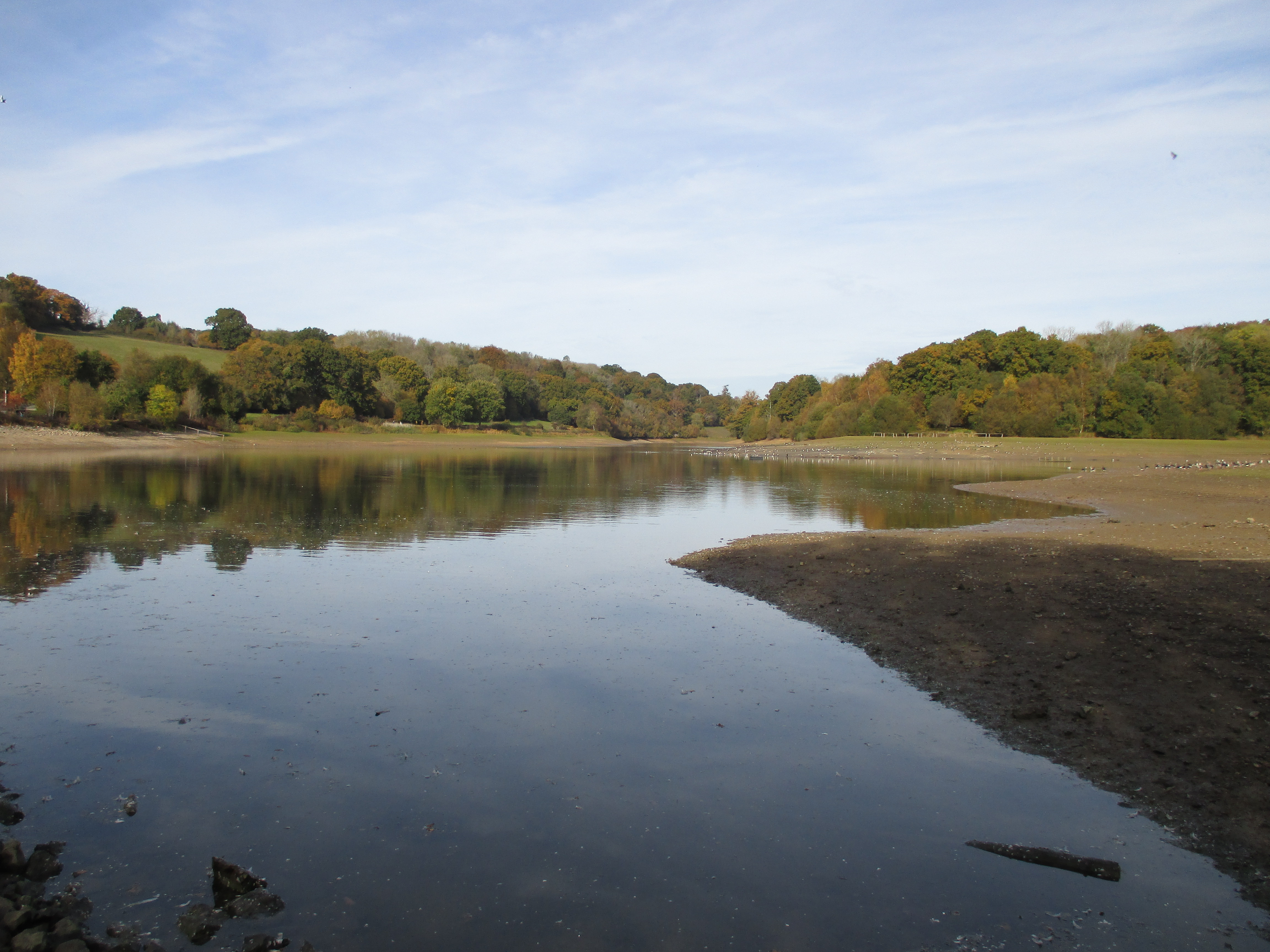
- Interactive map of Ardingly Reservoir
- Type: Local Nature Reserve
- Location: Ardingly, West Sussex
- OS grid: TQ 329 294
- Area: 74.5 hectares (184 acres)
- Manager: South East Water

Ardingly Reservoir is west of Ardingly in West Sussex. The southern end is a 74.5-hectare (184-acre) Local Nature Reserve owned and managed by South East Water.

The reservoir feeds the River Ouse located in West Sussex, England 5 miles (8.0 km) north of Haywards Heath. The villages of Ardingly and Balcombe are immediately to the east and north of the reservoir respectively. It was created in 1979 by damming Shell Brook, a tributary of the River Ouse which flows into the Ouse about 500m south of the reservoir. It is filled with water pumped from the River Ouse when river flows are high. The water is stored in the reservoir before being treated and distributed to consumers.

Ardingly Activity Centre provides watersports for the public including wind surfing, kayaking, powerboating, paddleboarding and dinghy sailing as well the Black Hut Kiosk that serves drinks and snacks. The reservoir is also used regularly by Ardingly Rowing Club and Mid Sussex Tri Club.

The reservoir is a popular fishing venue offering 3 miles (5 km) of freshwater fishing for carp, tench, pike, roach, rudd, eel, gudgeon, European perch and bream.

The west bank of the reservoir is private property of the Balcombe Estate but the north, south and east shores offer public rights of way and bridleways. Ornithologists are catered for with two bird hides situated on the east bank.
