= Ebernoe Common =

Protected area in Ebernoe, West Sussex, England

Coordinates: 51.035°N 0.611°W

- Site of Special Scientific Interest
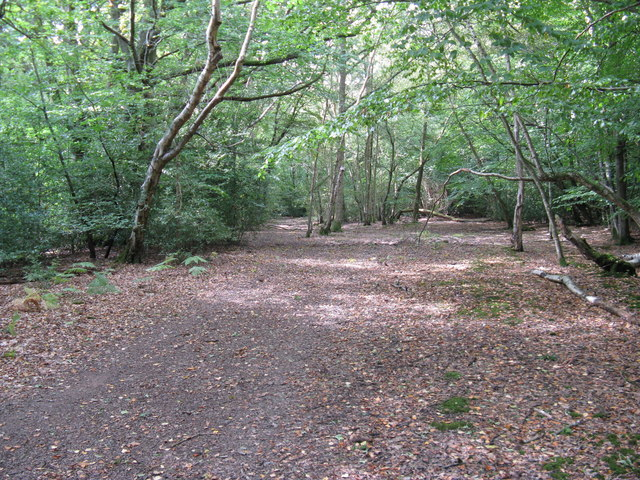
- Location of Ebernoe Common.
- Area of search: West Sussex
- Grid reference: SU 975 271
- Interest: Biological
- Area: 233.9 hectares (578 acres)
- Notification date: 2003
- Location map: Magic Map

Ebernoe Common is a 233.9-hectare (578-acre) biological Site of Special Scientific Interest in Ebernoe, north of Petworth in West Sussex. It is a Nature Conservation Review site, Grade I, a national nature reserve and a Special Area of Conservation. It is managed by the Sussex Wildlife Trust

This site consists of several blocks of ancient woodland. It is nationally important for lichens, with over 100 species, and for fungi, with seven Red Data Book species. It is also nationally important for woodland breeding birds and for bats, especially barbastelles and Bechstein’s.
