= Brighton and Lewes Downs Biosphere Reserve =

- Location within England
- Location: Sussex, England
- Nearest city: Brighton and Hove, Sussex, England
- Coordinates: 50°50′56″N 0°6′28″W
- Area: 29,514 hectares (113.95 sq mi)
- Established: 2014
- Governing body: Brighton & Hove City Council, Lewes District Council, Adur District Council, South Downs National Park Authority, Natural England, Sussex Inshore Fisheries & Conservation Authority, Marine Management Organisation
- Website: biospherehere.org.uk/our-biosphere-is-here/

The Living Coast (formerly the Brighton and Lewes Downs Biosphere Reserve, established 2014) is a UNESCO Biosphere Reserve located in Sussex on the southeast coast of England near the city of Brighton and Hove. Forming a central unit of the hills of the South Downs National Park, it is centred on the Brighton chalk block that lies between the River Adur in the west and the River Ouse in the east. Chalk downland makes up the principal terrestrial landscape of the area, bounded at each end by the two river valleys. The coastline is dominated by high chalk cliffs in the east and urbanized plains in the west, running to the estuary of the River Adur at Shoreham-by-Sea.

== Area ==
The reserve's surface area is 29,514 hectares (113.95 sq mi). The core area is 1,832 hectares (7.07 sq mi), surrounded by a buffer zone of 20,479 hectares (79.07 sq mi) and transition area(s) of 7,203 hectares (27.81 sq mi).

== Ecological characteristics ==
Brighton and Lewes Downs Biosphere Reserve is found within the temperate broadleaf forests biome of the Palearctic realm's British Island province and includes the following habitats: coastal chalk cliffs, sub-tidal chalk reef, freshwater wetland, shingle beaches, deciduous woodland, river estuaries and chalk grassland.

Three distinct but interrelated environments make up the biosphere reserve area; rural, coastal and marine, and urban. The rural environment contains lowland chalk grassland which is one of the richest wildlife habitats in the country and particularly important for its high botanical species diversity with up to 40-50 vascular plant species per square meter. It also supports the invertebrate communities, notably butterflies with 20 species having a substantial proportion of their breeding populations within this habitat. Characteristic species include: Phyteuma orbiculare, Wart-biter (Decticus verrucivorus), and Adonis blue butterfly (Lysandra bellargus). The coastal and marine environments are made up of a moderately exposed coast and inshore area of the English Channel with cliffs providing nesting niches for birds such as Northern fulmar (Fulmarus glacialis). The discontinuous chalk ledge to the west of Brighton gives rise to a unique series of low underwater north-facing chalk cliffs with biological records of over 300 marine species in the area.

The area is home to 211 species that have been recorded on international conservation lists, such as the European eel (Anguilla Anguilla)) in addition to 1,052 local rare species including the hedgehog (Erinaceus europaeus) and yellowhammer (Emberiza citronella). Important local genetic varieties of species include the unique elm tree {Elmus spp.) as well as wild apple tree varieties. The domesticated breeds of Southdown sheep and rare Sussex cattle are also distinctive to the area.

== Socio-economic characteristics ==
The biosphere area is home to around 371,500 people, the great majority of whom are urban-dwellers in the transition area (population around 358,500) in the main settlements of the city of Brighton and Hove and the towns of Lewes, Newhaven, Peacehaven, Shoreham and Southwick. The rural buffer zone of the South Downs National Park is additionally home to a population of around 13,500 people whilst no inhabitants occupy the 14 protected areas that make up the core areas. Due to its proximity to London (55 miles) it is a target for tourists, receiving around 12 million visitors per year. They are attracted to the natural environment, contemporary culture and heritage, which includes a range of archaeological sites dating back to the Neolithic period as well as a legacy of more recent urban architecture.

Evolving from a seaside resort to a service sector economy, Brighton and Hove has a total population of 273,000. However, socio-economic challenges exist with urban areas constrained in their size and future growth by their geography (between the sea and the national park). Economic activities include harvesting and extraction of primary resources, mainly through farming and commercial sea fishing. Coastal fishing sees the majority of the catch sent to local and regional markets and restaurants with the remainder going to mainland Europe where there is high demand.

== Sources ==
This article incorporates text from a free content work (license statement/permission). Text taken from UNESCO - MAB Biosphere Reserves Directory, UNESCO, UNESCO.
