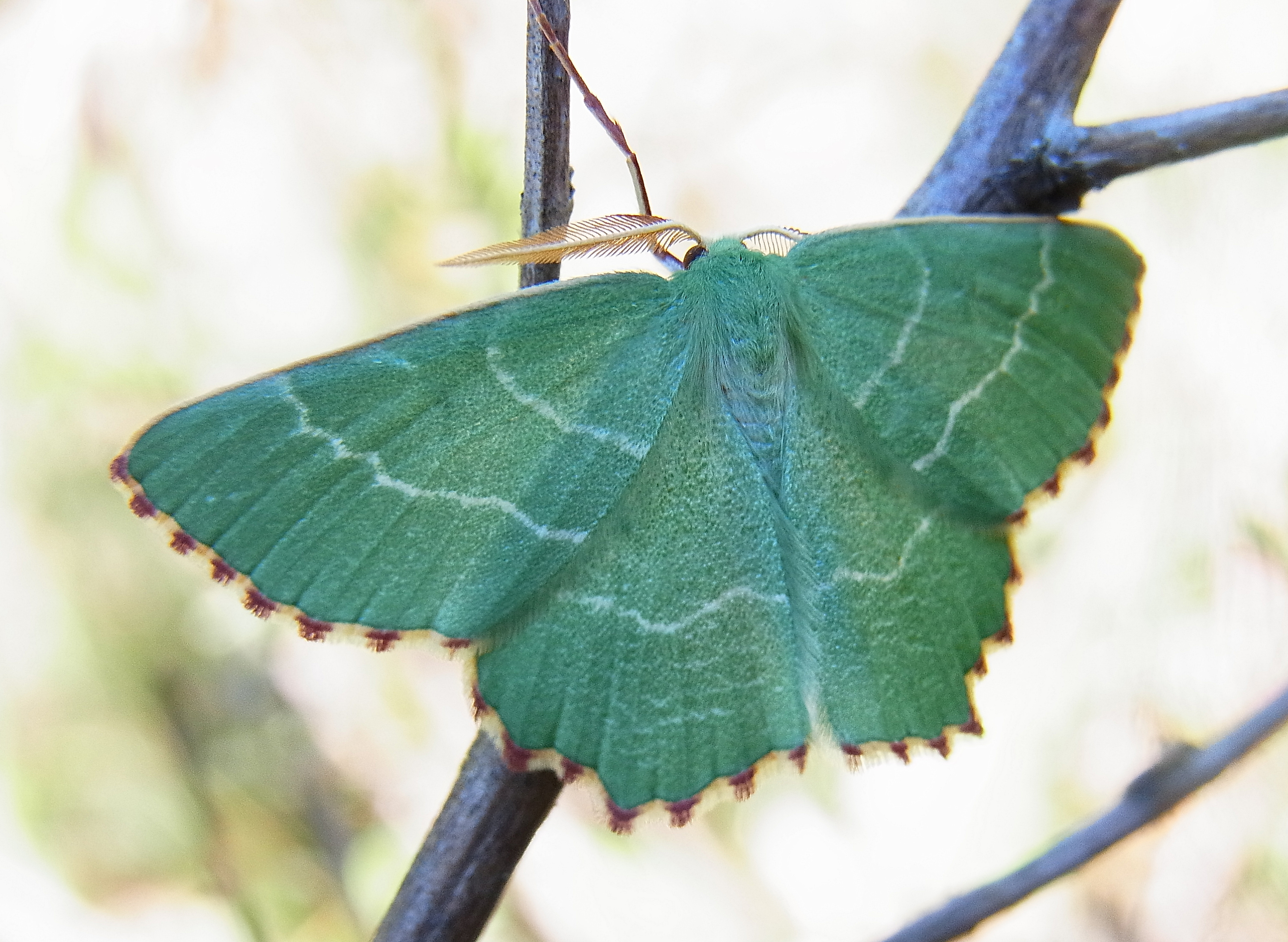

Scientific classification
- Domain: Eukaryota
- Kingdom: Animalia
- Phylum: Arthropoda
- Class: Insecta
- Order: Lepidoptera
- Family: Geometridae
- Genus: Thalera
- Species: T. fimbrialis

Binomial name
- Thalera fimbrialis (Scopoli, 1763)

Synonyms
- List: Phalaena fimbrialis Scopoli, 1763; Phalaena thymiaria Linnaeus, 1767; Geometra bupleuraria Denis & Schiffermüller, 1775

= Thalera fimbrialis =

Species of moth

Thalera fimbrialis, the Sussex emerald, is a species of moth of the family Geometridae, found in Europe and across the Palearctic to the area surrounding the Amur River in China. It was described by the Italian physician and naturalist Giovanni Antonio Scopoli in 1763.

== Description ==
The wingspan is 25–30 mm. The ground colour is green which can fade with increasing lifespan and then assumes yellowish tints. The outer edge of the wings is yellowish, the hair fringes along the edge are alternately white and reddish-brown. The forewing has two white crosslines, the hind wing only a single line as a continuation of the forewing outer line. The hind wing shows a slightly forward corner in the middle, over which there is an indentation. The moth flies from June to August depending on the location.

Larva

Larva overwinter part-grown and when fully grown is long and thin, green with a brownish-red dorsal stripe that is sometimes broken up into a variety of spots. The head is divided in two by a deep cleft in the middle. On the front body segment there are a pair of spikes protruding above the head. During ecdysis, the caterpillar eats the discarded skin, possibly for food value or possibly to remove clues that a predator may use to find the moth. They feed on various woody and herbaceous plants, including,

- Erica species,
- heather (Calluna species)
- cinquefoils (Potentilla species)
- wild carrot, (Daucus carota)
- yarrow
- ragworts

and probably many other species.

In the UK, this species only inhabits vegetated shingle and primarily feeds on wild carrot, (Daucus carota) with late larval instars occasionally found on plants in the ragwort (Senecio species).

== Distribution ==
Found across Europe and Asia as far as east as China. It is a Red Data Book species in the UK, only breeding in the Dungeness area of Kent and one site in Rye, East Sussex.

== Gallery ==
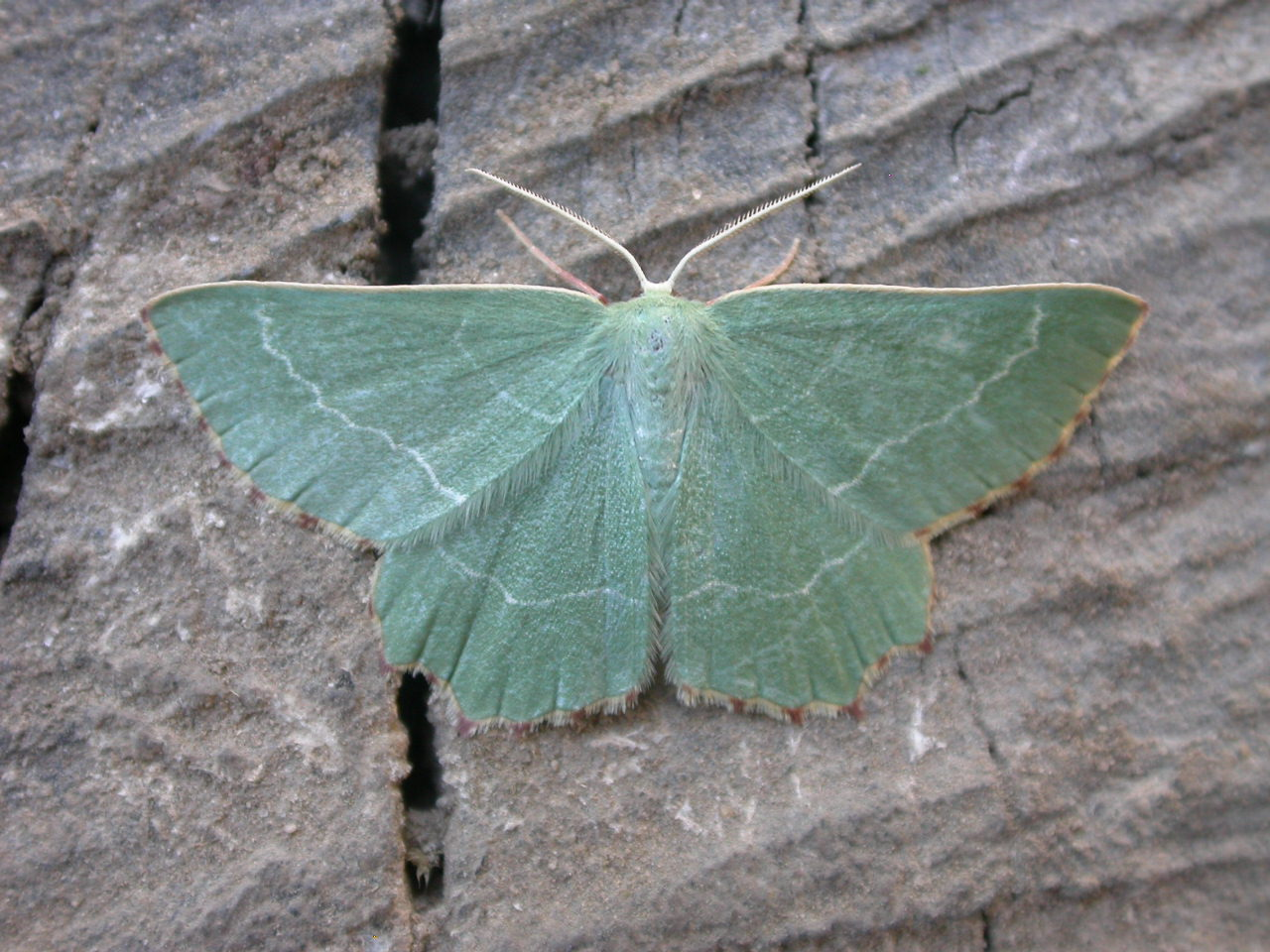

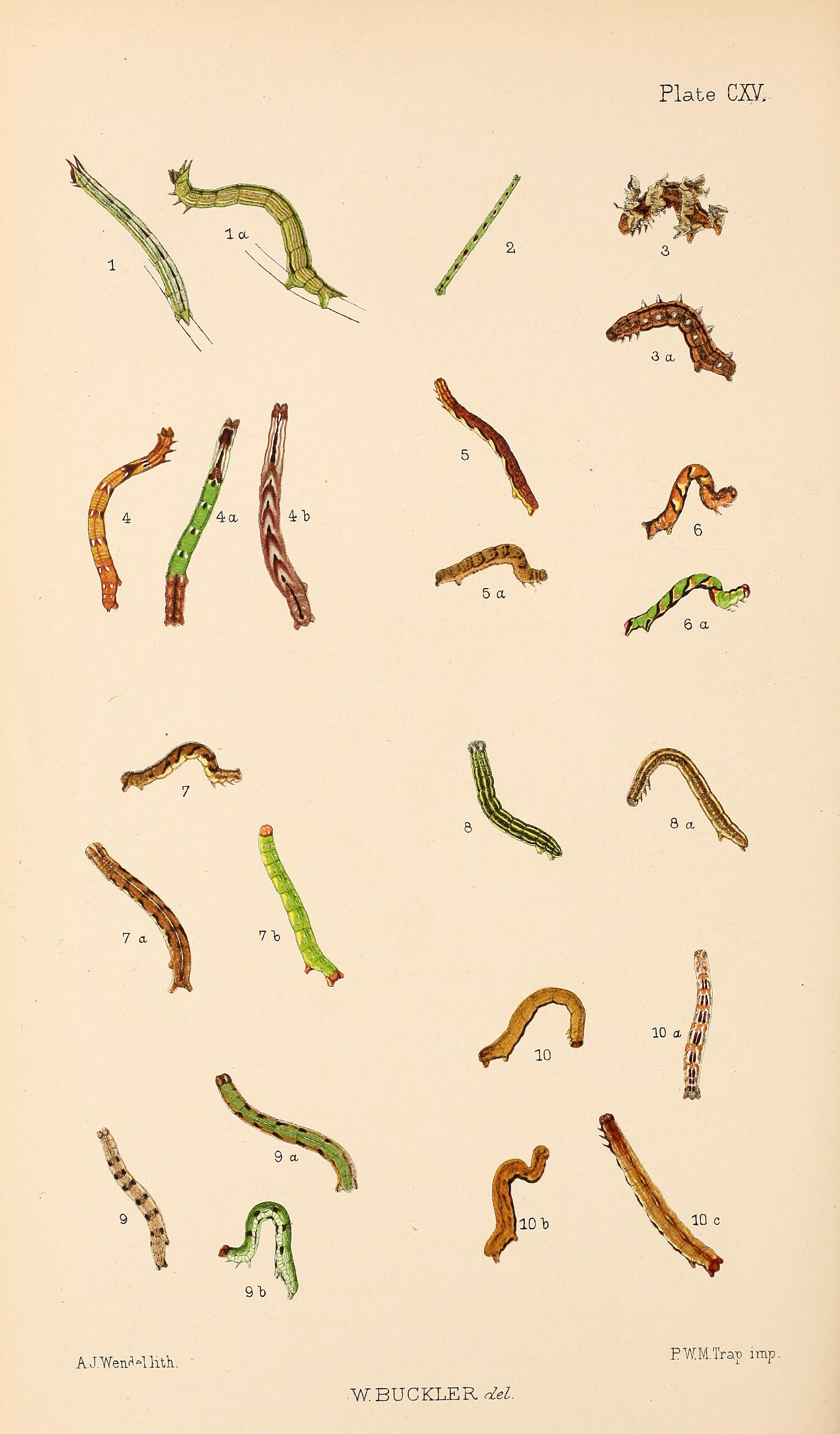
Figs 4, 4a, 4b Larvae after final moult

== Etymology ==
First described by Giovanni Antonio Scopoli, in his Entomologia Carniolica, published in Vienna in 1763; he named the moth Phalaena fimbrialis. Carl Linnaeus, the Swedish taxonomist, placed most of the moths in the genus Phalaena; a Greek word used by Aristotle to describe moths. It was later places in the genus Thalera, from thaleros i.e. blooming, fresh, youthful – from the spring-like, green colour of the wings. The specific name fimbrialis means a fringe, which refers to the red-chequered terminal cilia on the wing.
