= Sussex cattle =

British breed of cattle

Sussex
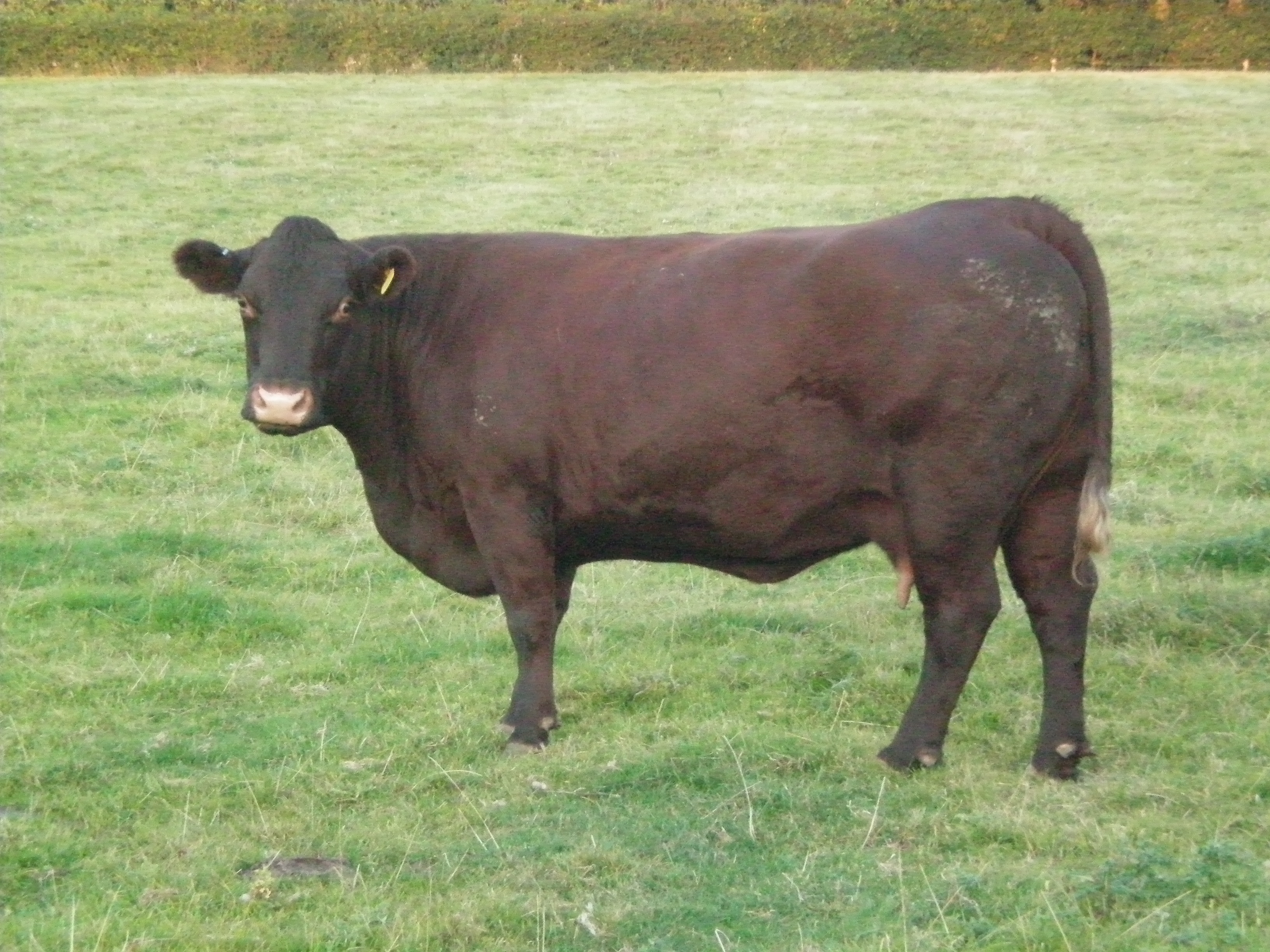
- Sussex cow
- Conservation status: FAO (2007): not at risk; DAD-IS (2021): at risk/endangered
- Country of origin: United Kingdom
- Distribution: UK; Africa; Australia; South America
- Use: beef; formerly draught

Traits
- Weight: Male: average 1002 kg; Female: average 677 kg
- Height: Male: average 145 cm; Female: average 135 cm
- Coat: rich red-brown coat, with a creamy white switch to the tail
- Horn status: naturally white-horned; there is a polled variant
- Cattle; Bos (primigenius) taurus

The Sussex is a British breed of red beef cattle from the Weald of Sussex, Surrey and Kent, in south-eastern England. Its traditional use as a draught ox on the Weald continued into the twentieth century. From the late nineteenth century it began to be selectively bred for beef production. It has been exported to many countries of the world; the largest population is in South Africa, where there may be half a million head.

== History ==
The Sussex is one of several similarly-coloured breeds of southern England – the others include the North Devon, the Hereford, the Lincoln Red and the Red Poll. These were primarily draught cattle, with powerful forequarters but less-developed hindquarters, and so not particularly suited to beef production.

Arthur Young Junior wrote in the early nineteenth century that the cattle of the Weald "must be unquestionably ranked among the best of the kingdom". William Cobbett in his Rural Rides also expressed surprise at finding some of the finest cattle on some of the most impoverished subsistence farms on the High Weald. The breed was numerous in Kent and the Wealden parts of Surrey as well as in Sussex in the late eighteenth century when Arthur Young toured Sussex and praised the breed in his book Agriculture of Sussex of 1793. He stayed at Petworth House where the progressive 3rd Earl of Egremont established a Sussex herd in Petworth Park which is still there today. High corn prices during the Napoleonic Wars led to a lot of grassland on the Low Weald being ploughed up and cattle herds greatly declined. Later in the 19th century rail transport caused an increase in dairy farming to supply the London market with a consequent decline in beef cattle breeding.

Use of draught oxen continued for longer in the Weald and on the South Downs than in most parts of England – at least one Sussex team was in use until 1929. There was some selection for better meat production in the 1860s and 1870s, but the Sussex remained essentially a draught breed until the end of the century.

A herd-book was started in 1837 or 1855. A breed society, the Sussex Herd Book Society, was formed in 1879, and in that year published breed records covering the period from 1855 to 1875.

From the latter part of the nineteenth century the Sussex was exported to various countries, among them what is now South Africa (from 1903), New Zealand (from 1904) and what is now Zambia. In the United States, a breed society was started in 1884; it later became inactive, but restarted in 1966. The first exports to the then Transvaal Colony of South Africa took place in 1903; a breed society was formed in 1920, and a herd-book was begun in that year or in 1906. The Sussex has better resistance to tick-borne disease and resistance to heat than most British breeds, and became widespread there; in 2016 it was estimated that there were 500 000 head in the country.

In the 1970s and 1980s the British breed society instigated a breeding programme aimed at increasing the growth rate of the Sussex to make it more competitive with other beef breeds such as the Devon and the Hereford: some cross-breeding with French Limousin and Salers was allowed for a time, and by 1988 the average weight of a 400-day-old bull had increased by about 3%. Some farmers believed that the cross-breeding had compromised the traditional merits of the Sussex (ability to forage, ease of calving, milkiness in cows, good temperament), and established a Traditional Sussex line within the breed. Also in the latter part of the twentieth century, a polled Sussex was created in the United Kingdom and in South Africa by cross-breeding with red Aberdeen Angus bulls.

Outside the UK, the Sussex is reported from Australia, Brazil, Botswana, Eswatini, Malawi, Namibia, Paraguay, Peru, the Seychelles, Zambia and Zimbabwe; only Namibia and the UK report population data, while only South Africa reports population data for the Polled Sussex. In 2007 the conservation status of the Sussex worldwide was listed by the FAO as "not at risk". In 2021 its UK status was reported to DAD-IS as "at risk"/"endangered"; the Rare Breeds Survival Trust listed it on its 2021–2022 watchlist among its UK native breeds, not assigning it to the higher "at risk" or "priority" categories.

== Characteristics ==
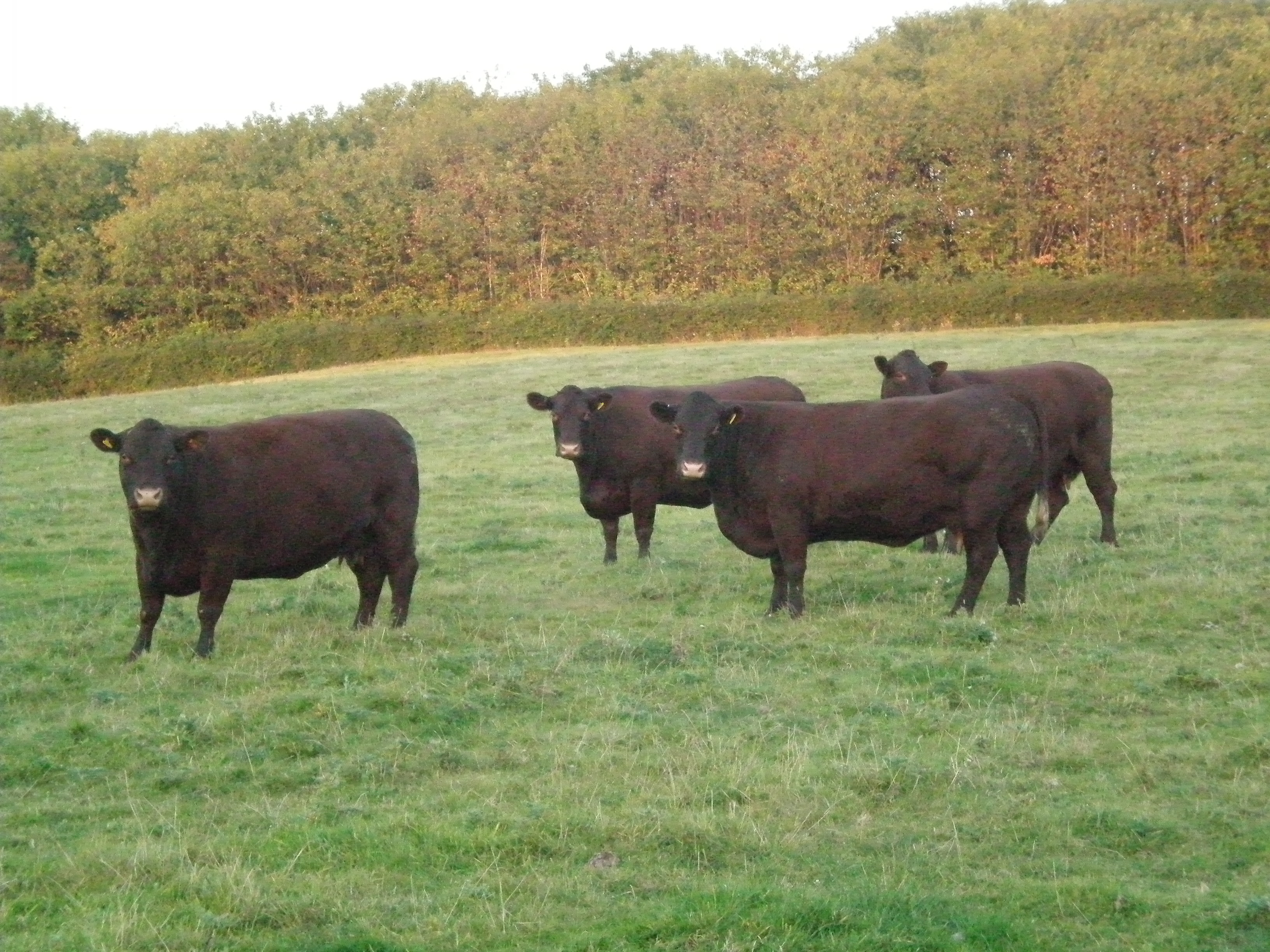
Sussex cows near Petworth

The Sussex has a rich red-brown coat, with a creamy white switch to the tail. It is a medium-sized, long-bodied animal; the horns are usually white.

== Use ==
The traditional rôle of the Sussex was as a draught beast. Oxen were used to draw ploughs, to pull carts and wagons, and to haul timber, often over ground that was too muddy or clayey for horses; spayed cows were also used for the same purposes. In 1797 a team of eighty-six oxen of this breed hauled a mill building a distance of some 3 km (2 mi) from Regency Square in Brighton to a new site on Dyke Road.

At the end of their working lives, these animals were fattened and sold for beef, frequently reaching substantial weights. The average weight of those sent to Smithfield Market for slaughter in the late eighteenth century was close to 900 kg; fattened eight-year-old oxen from one farmer weighed up to 1375 kg, while the heaviest Sussex ox on record weighed 1828 kg.

The modern Sussex is commonly slaughtered at about 16 months, when it has a live weight of about 475 kg, yielding a carcase of some 260 kg – a dressing percentage of about 55%. Daily weight gain is of the order of 0.9 kg per day.
