= Lincoln Red =

British breed of cattle

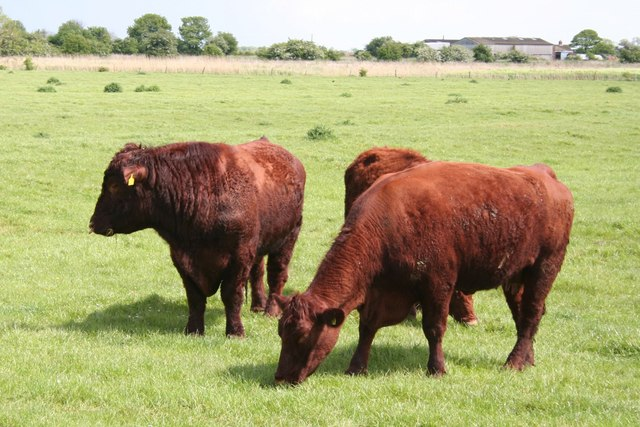
- At North Somercotes, Lincolnshire
- Conservation status: cross-bred: FAO (2007): not at risk; DAD-IS (2022): endangered-maintained; original population: FAO (2007): endangered-maintained; DAD-IS (2022): at risk/critical; RBST (2022–2023): at risk
- Other names: Lincoln Red Shorthorn; Lincolnshire Red Shorthorn
- Country of origin: United Kingdom
- Use: formerly dual-purpose, now beef

Traits
- Weight: Male: average 990 kg; Female: average 700 kg
- Height: Male: average 145 cm; Female: average 135 cm
- Coat: deep cherry-red
- Horn status: formerly horned, now polled
- Cattle; Bos (primigenius) taurus

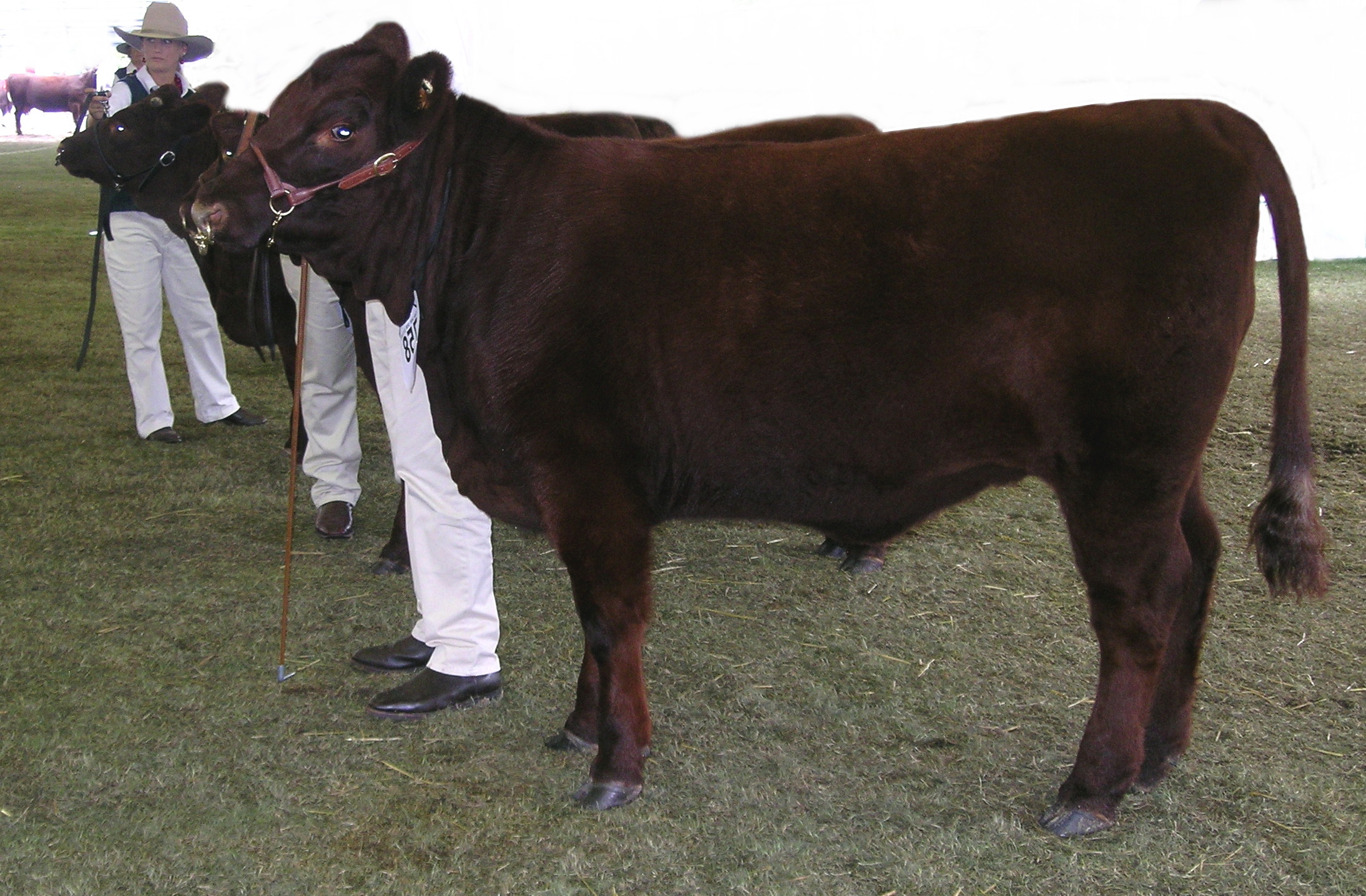
Judging of the Lincoln Red heifer class at the Sydney Royal Easter Show

The Lincoln Red is a British breed of red-coated beef cattle. It originates in, and is named for, the county of Lincolnshire in the eastern Midlands of England. It was selectively bred in the late eighteenth and early nineteenth centuries by crossing large local draught cattle of the region with Teeswater Shorthorns of medium size. It was at first known as the Lincolnshire Red Shorthorn, and was a dual-purpose breed, reared both for milk and for beef. The polling gene was introduced in the early twentieth century, and the cattle are now usually polled; the word 'shorthorn' was dropped from the breed name in 1960. In the twenty-first century it is reared for beef.

== History ==
During the seventeenth century, draught cattle were brought from Holland to the eastern Midlands of England. These were large, coarse, powerful and rugged animals with large hooves and short horns, usually either red or red-and-white in colour. In his Cheape and good hvsbandry for the well-ordering of all beasts and fowles of 1631, Gervase Markham describes the cattle of Lincolnshire as pied, with more white than of other colours, and with little crooked horns. John Mortimer, writing in 1712, refers to these as the "Dutch-breed".

In the latter part of the eighteenth century and the early years of the nineteenth, cattle-breeders in Lincolnshire bought medium-sized red Shorthorn (also called Durham) cattle from the counties of Durham and Yorkshire, and cross-bred these with the local large draught cattle. One such breeder was Thomas Turnell of Wragby, who well before the end of the century had a herd of cherry-red short-horned cattle of medium size, fast-growing and quick to put on weight; they were known as 'Turnell Reds'. Cattle of this type soon acquired a good reputation; from 1822 they were registered in Coates's Shorthorn herd-book. In 1895 a breed society, the Lincoln Red Shorthorn Association, was formed, and within a year had published its own herd-book. By the 1920s the Lincoln Red Shorthorn was the second-most numerous registered breed in the country.

From the beginning of the Second World War until about 1956, a breeder name Eric Pentecost worked to introduce the polled gene to the breed while retaining its other characteristics; he first used a Red Poll bull, and later made use of Aberdeen Angus bulls, both black and red. The polled stock was first shown in 1956, and took several prizes; in the same year a polled Lincoln bull was licensed by the Ministry of Agriculture.

They are now present in a number of countries around the world. These cattle were imported into Australia over 100 years ago and the Lincoln Red Cattle Society (Aust) was formed in 1971 with one registered herd.

== Characteristics ==
Lincoln Red cattle are a very dark red in colour that reduces the likelihood of sunburn and cancer. They do not have horns. They may be polled and are noted for their docility and an ability to thrive under all conditions.
