= List of local nature reserves in West Sussex =

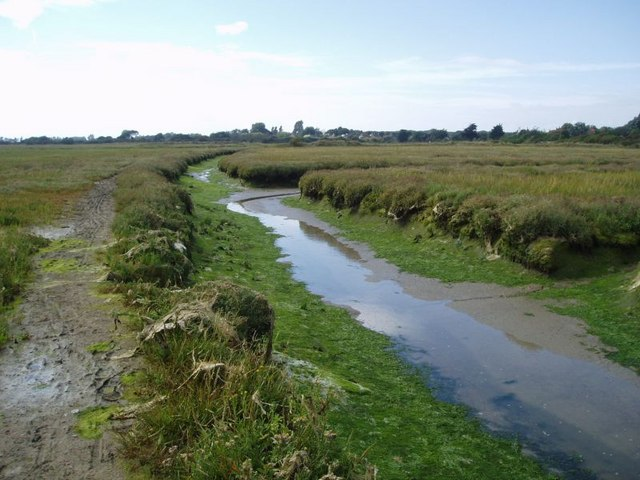
Pagham Harbour

Local nature reserves (LNRs) are designated by local authorities under the National Parks and Access to the Countryside Act 1949. The local authority must have a legal control over the site, by owning or leasing it or having an agreement with the owner. LNRs are sites which have a special local interest either biologically or geologically, and local authorities have a duty to care for them. They can apply local bye-laws to manage and protect LNRs.

As of March 2019, there are twenty-seven LNRs in West Sussex. Nine are Sites of Special Scientific Interest, six are Nature Conservation Review sites, four are Ramsar sites, two are Special Areas of Conservation, four are Special Protection Areas, one includes a scheduled monument and two are managed by the Sussex Wildlife Trust.

West Sussex is in south-east England and it has a population of approximately 780,000. The county town is Chichester. In the north of the county are the heavy clays and sands of the Weald. The chalk of the South Downs runs across the centre from east to west and in the south a coastal plain runs down to the English Channel.

== Key ==
=== Public access ===
- No = no public access to site
- PP = public access to part of site
- Yes = public access to all or most of the site

=== Other classifications ===
- NCR = Nature Conservation Review site
- Ramsar = Ramsar site, an internationally important wetland site
- SAC = Special Area of Conservation
- SM = Scheduled monument
- SPA = Special Protection Area under the European Union Directive on the Conservation of Wild Birds
- SSSI = Site of Special Scientific Interest
- SWT = Sussex Wildlife Trust

== Sites ==
Site	Photograph	Area (Note: The area is taken from the Natural England map of each site. (Click on the identify icon (i) in the "Feature Tools" and then click on the site.))	Location (Note: The location is taken from the Natural England details page for the site.)	Borough	Other classifications	Map (Note: The maps are on the Natural England database of Local Nature Reserves.)	Details (Note: Details are on the pages on each site in the Natural England database of Local Nature Reserves.)	Access	Description
Ardingly Reservoir	Ardingly Reservoir	74.5 hectares (184 acres)	Haywards Heath; 51.049°N 0.105°W; TQ 329 294	Mid Sussex		Map	Details	Yes	The reservoir has open water, hay meadow, deciduous woodland, hazel coppice, reedbeds and wetland. There are sandstone outcrops which support uncommon ferns, mosses, liverworts and lichens. Nesting birds include great crested grebes and kingfishers.
Ashenground and Bolnore Woods	Ashenground Wood	14.4 hectares (36 acres)	Haywards Heath; 50.990°N 0.116°W; TQ 323 229	Mid Sussex		Map	Details	Yes	These woods have oak, beech and field maple, together with old coppice hornbeam, ash and hazel. Fauna include bats, woodpeckers and owls.
Bedelands Farm Nature Reserve	Bedelands Farm	36.2 hectares (89 acres)	Burgess Hill; 50.972°N 0.123°W; TQ 319 208	Mid Sussex		Map	Details	Yes	The farm has woodland, wildflower meadows, grazed meadows, wetland and ancient hedgerows. The woodland has ancient hornbeams and wild service trees, while wildflowers include the yellow rattle.
Blunts Wood and Paiges Meadow	Blunts Wood and Paiges Meadow	28.9 hectares (71 acres)	Haywards Heath; 51.004°N 0.124°W; TQ 317 244	Mid Sussex		Map	Details	Yes	This site has diverse habitats with a pond, wetland, hedgerows, grassland, birch woodland, hazel coppice, mixed coppice and bluebell woodland.
Brandy Hole Copse	Brandy Hole Copse	6.5 hectares (16 acres)	Chichester; 50.852°N 0.791°W; SU 852 065	Chichester	SM	Map	Details	Yes	This site has broadleaved and coniferous woodland, open water, marshland, heath, tall fern and herbs. Fauna includes pipistrelle bats.
The Brooks Local Nature Reserve	The Brooks Local Nature Reserve	19.1 hectares (47 acres)	Bognor Regis; 50.805°N 0.676°W; SU 934 014	Arun		Map	Details	Yes	The Brooks has extensive grassland, reedbeds, ponds and newly planted woodland. One area has been turned into a dog-free wildlife sanctuary for ground-nesting birds. The site is flooded every winter, which makes it a good habitat for wetland flora and fauna.
Burton and Chingford Ponds	Burton Mill Pond	63.0 hectares (156 acres)	Petworth; 50.949°N 0.612°W; SU 976 175	Chichester	SSSI SWT	Map	Details	Yes	This site has ponds, carr woodland, bog, wet heath and marshy grassland. There is a diverse range of invertebrates including three nationally rare species, the snail Omphiscola glabra and the craneflies Erioptera meijerei and Tipula marginata. The site is also important for its breeding water birds, such as water rails and great crested grebes.
Eames Farm	Eames Farm	132.5 hectares (327 acres)	Southbourne; 50.833°N 0.926°W; SU 757 043	Chichester	NCR Ramsar SPA SSSI	Map	Details	No	This area of grazing marsh, wetland and reedbed is managed as an organic farm. It has many rare plants and insects and a diverse variety of migrating waders and wildfowl.
Eastern Road Nature Reserve	Eastern Road Nature Reserve	3.5 hectares (8.6 acres)	Haywards Heath; 51.010°N 0.073°W; TQ 353 252	Mid Sussex		Map	Details	Yes	The reserve has rough grassland, wetland, woodland and scrub. There are aquatic insects such as dragonflies and other invertebrates include frogs and newts.
Fairmile Bottom	Fairmile Bottom	61.3 hectares (151 acres)	Arundel; 50.876°N 0.596°W; SU 989 094	Arun	SSSI	Map	Details	Yes	This site has wildflower meadows on chalk and woodland with groves of yew trees. There is an outstanding variety of beetles and many moths and butterflies.
Grattons Park	Grattons Park	7.7 hectares (19 acres)	Crawley; 51.127°N 0.159°W; TQ 289 380	Crawley		Map	Details	Yes	Gatwick Stream runs through this park and other habitats are broadleaved woodland and grassland. Flora include lesser celandine and wild daffodils, while there are birds such as treecreepers, great spotted woodpecker and long-tailed tits.
Harting Down	Harting Down	206.6 hectares (511 acres)	Harting; 50.956°N 0.864°W; SU 799 180	Chichester	NCR SSSI	Map	Details	Yes	This sloping site on the South Downs has grassland with scattered woodland and scrub. There are grizzled skipper butterflies, blue carpenter bees and cheese snails.
Iping Common (Stedham with Iping)	Iping Common	118.2 hectares (292 acres)	Midhurst; 50.990°N 0.792°W; SU 849 219	Chichester	NCR SSSI SWT	Map	Details	Yes	This is described by Natural England as one of the richest areas of heath in the county. Most of it is dry but there are also areas of wet heath, two ponds, woodland, scrub and grassland. It has a rich invertebrate fauna and breeding heathland birds include nightjars and stonechats.
Lancing Ring	Lancing Ring	29.4 hectares (73 acres)	Lancing; 50.843°N 0.323°W; TQ 182 062	Adur		Map	Details	Yes	This chalk grassland site has adders and lizards. There is also woodland with flowers including early purple orchids and dewponds which have many newts.
Lynchmere Commons	Lynchmere Commons	122.0 hectares (301 acres)	Linchmere; 51.072°N 0.768°W; SU 864 310	Chichester		Map	Details	Yes	This heathland site is composed of Stanley, Lynchmere and Marley Commons. They have diverse insect species and unusual plants such as bilberries.
Mill Hill	Mill Hill	13.5 hectares (33 acres)	Shoreham-by-Sea; 50.853°N 0.281°W; TQ 211 073	Adur		Map	Details	Yes	This site has chalk grassland, scrub and secondary woodland. It is one of the best areas in Sussex for butterflies, with 29 species recorded, including the Adonis blue. More than 160 species of flowering plant have been recorded, such as horseshoe vetch.
Nutborne Marshes	Nutborne Marshes	386.9 hectares (956 acres)	Thorney Island; 50.822°N 0.900°W; SU 776 031	Chichester	NCR Ramsar SAC SPA SSSI	Map	Details	No	This is an area of intertidal and subtidal saltmarsh and mudflats. There are many invertebrates on the mudflats such as ragworms and the banks have unusual plants including sea wormwood. Migrating birds include curlews, grey plovers and dunlins.
Pagham Harbour	Pagham Harbour	599.1 hectares (1,480 acres)	Bognor Regis; 50.766°N 0.766°W; SZ 871 970	Arun	NCR Ramsar SPA SSSI	Map	Details	PP	This is a large area of salt marsh, mud flats, shingle, open water, reed swamp and wet grassland. It is of national importance for breeding birds and wintering wildfowl and waders. It also has nationally important communities of plants and invertebrates, including the nationally endangered sea anemone Nematostella vectensis.
Pilsey Island	Pilsey Island	17.8 hectares (44 acres)	Thorney Island; 50.801°N 0.909°W; SU 770 007	Chichester	NCR Ramsar SAC SPA SSSI	Map	Details	No	The island has sand dunes, mudflats, salt marsh and bare and vegetated shingle. There are many plants, spiders and insects.
Scrase Valley	Scrase Valley	8.0 hectares (20 acres)	Haywards Heath; 51.004°N 0.086°W; TQ 344 245	Mid Sussex		Map	Details	Yes	This site has grassland, woodland and marsh. There are a number of unusual plants, such as purple toothwort, marsh cinquefoil, meadow thistle and marsh speedwell. The Friends of The Scrase Valley have planted three black poplar trees, which is a nationally rare species.
Shoreham Beach	Shoreham Beach	26.2 hectares (65 acres)	Shoreham-by-Sea; 50.826°N 0.271°W; TQ 219 044	Adur		Map	Details	Yes	The beach has vegetated shingle, which is an internationally rare habitat, with flora including yellow horned poppy, sea kale and curled dock.
Target Hill Park	Target Hill Park	9.0 hectares (22 acres)	Crawley; 51.097°N 0.218°W; TQ 249 346	Crawley		Map	Details	Yes	The diverse habitats in this park include ponds, wetlands, woodlands, meadows and scrub. There are reptiles such as slow-worms, adders and common lizards, while butterflies include skippers, meadow brown, small heaths and ringlets.
Tilgate Forest	Tilgate Forest	6.9 hectares (17 acres)	Crawley; 51.102°N 0.163°W; TQ 287 352	Crawley		Map	Details	Yes	This site has woods, tall herb and fern, and heathland. The most common trees in areas of natural woodland are birch, oak and hazel, while plantations are mainly Scots pine, red oak, western hemlock and beech.
Tottington Wood	Tottington Wood	5.1 hectares (13 acres)	Henfield; 50.900°N 0.272°W; TQ 216 126	Horsham		Map	Details	Yes	This semi-ancient wood is recorded back to 1600 and it has an oak tree which is over 250 years old. Mammals include roe deer and bats and there are birds such as woodpeckers and blue tits.
Warnham	Warnham	38.4 hectares (95 acres)	Horsham; 51.082°N 0.330°W; TQ 171 327	Horsham		Map	Details	Yes	The principal feature of the site is the 7-hectare (17-acre) Warnham Millpond, together with its islands and marginal vegetation. Boldings Brook runs through the site and in the winter it floods areas of wet grassland and willow carr. Invertebrates include 523 species of moths and 366 plant species have been recorded.
West Beach	West Beach	15.7 hectares (39 acres)	Littlehampton; 50.780°N 0.547°W; TQ 025 010	Arun	SSSI	Map	Details	Yes	This stretch of shoreline has sand dunes at the back with a vegetated shingle beach, which is a nationally uncommon habitat, in front. The intertidal zone has soft muds and sands with many invertebrates, which are an important source of food for wintering birds, especially sanderling.
Widewater Lagoon	Widewater Lagoon	8.8 hectares (22 acres)	Lancing; 50.824°N 0.299°W; TQ 199 041	Adur		Map	Details	Yes	This coastal lagoon is separated from Lancing Beach by a man-made shingle bank. The water is brackish and there are wildfowl such as herons and swans.

== See also ==
- List of Sites of Special Scientific Interest in West Sussex
- Sussex Wildlife Trust

== Sources ==
- Ratcliffe, Derek, ed. (1977). A Nature Conservation Review. Vol. 2. Cambridge, UK: Cambridge University Press. ISBN 978-0-521-21403-2.
