= Scrase Valley =

Nature reserve in West Sussex, England

Coordinates: 51.004°N 0.086°W

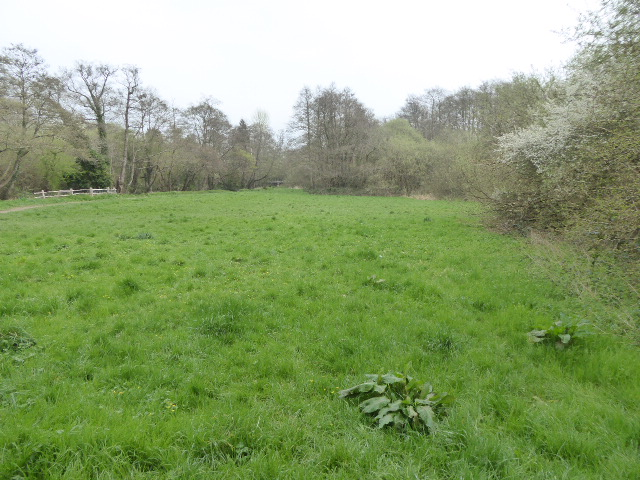
- Interactive map of Scrase Valley
- Type: Local Nature Reserve
- Location: , West Sussex
- OS grid: TQ 344 245
- Area: 8.0 hectares (20 acres)
- Manager: Mid Sussex District Council

The Scrase Valley is an 8-hectare (20-acre) Local Nature Reserve on the eastern outskirts of Haywards Heath in West Sussex. It is owned and managed by Mid Sussex District Council.

This site has grassland, woodland and marsh. There are a number of unusual plants, such as purple toothwort, marsh cinquefoil, meadow thistle and marsh speedwell. The Friends of The Scrase Valley have planted three black poplar trees, which is nationally rare.

There is access from a number points including a footpath from Barn Cottage Lane.
