= Eremobia =

Scientific classification
- Kingdom: Animalia
- Phylum: Arthropoda
- Clade: Pancrustacea
- Class: Insecta
- Order: Lepidoptera
- Superfamily: Noctuoidea
- Family: Noctuidae
- Genus: Eremobia; Stephens, 1829

Genus of moths

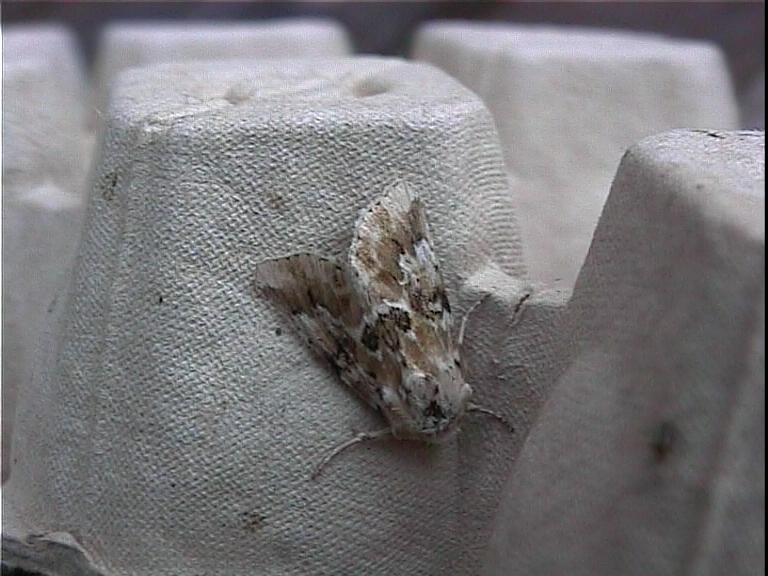
Eremobia Ochroleuca

Eremobia is a genus of moths of the family Noctuidae.

== Species ==
- Eremobia decipiens (Alphéraky, 1895)
- Eremobia ochroleuca (Denis & Schiffermüller, 1775)
- Eremobia puengeleri (Bartel, 1904)
- Eremobia sajanus (Bang-Haas, 1906)
