= Shoreham-by-Sea =

Town in West Sussex, England

Coordinates: 50°50′02″N 0°16′23″W

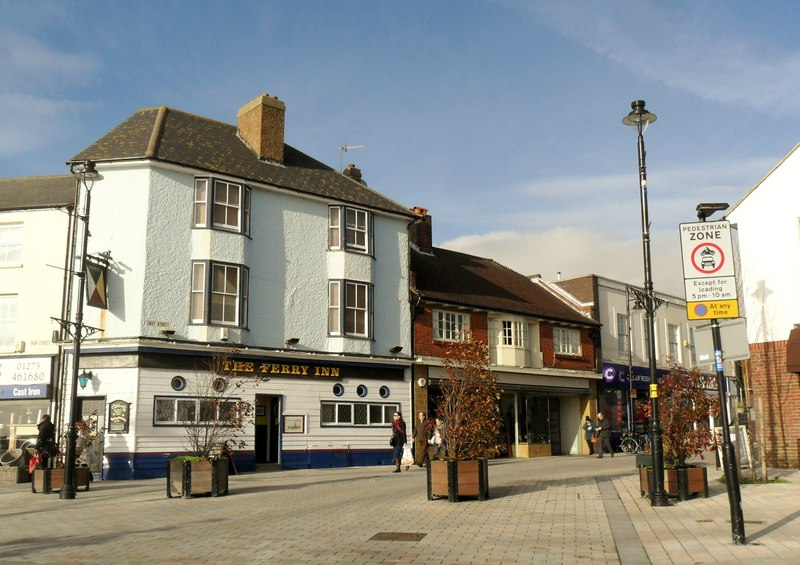
- East Street, a pedestrianised street in Shoreham-by-Sea

- Location within West Sussex
- Area: 3.80 sq mi (9.8 km^{2})
- Population: 20,547 2011 Census
  - Density: 5,407/sq mi (2,088/km^{2})
- OS grid reference: TQ220051
  - London: 47 miles (76 km) north
- District: Adur
- Shire county: West Sussex
- Region: South East
- Country: England
- Sovereign state: United Kingdom
- Post town: Shoreham-by-Sea
- Postcode district: BN43
- Dialling code: 01273
- Police: Sussex
- Fire: West Sussex
- Ambulance: South East Coast
- UK Parliament: East Worthing and Shoreham

Shoreham-by-Sea (often shortened to Shoreham) is a coastal town and port in the Adur district, in the county of West Sussex, England. In 2011 it had a population of 20,547.

The town is bordered to its north by the South Downs, to its west by the Adur Valley, and to its south by the River Adur and Shoreham Beach on the English Channel. The town lies in the middle of the ribbon of urban development along the English south coast, approximately equidistant from the city of Brighton and Hove to the east and the town of Worthing to the west. Shoreham covers an area of 2,430 acres (980 ha) and has a population of 20,547 (2011 census).

== History ==
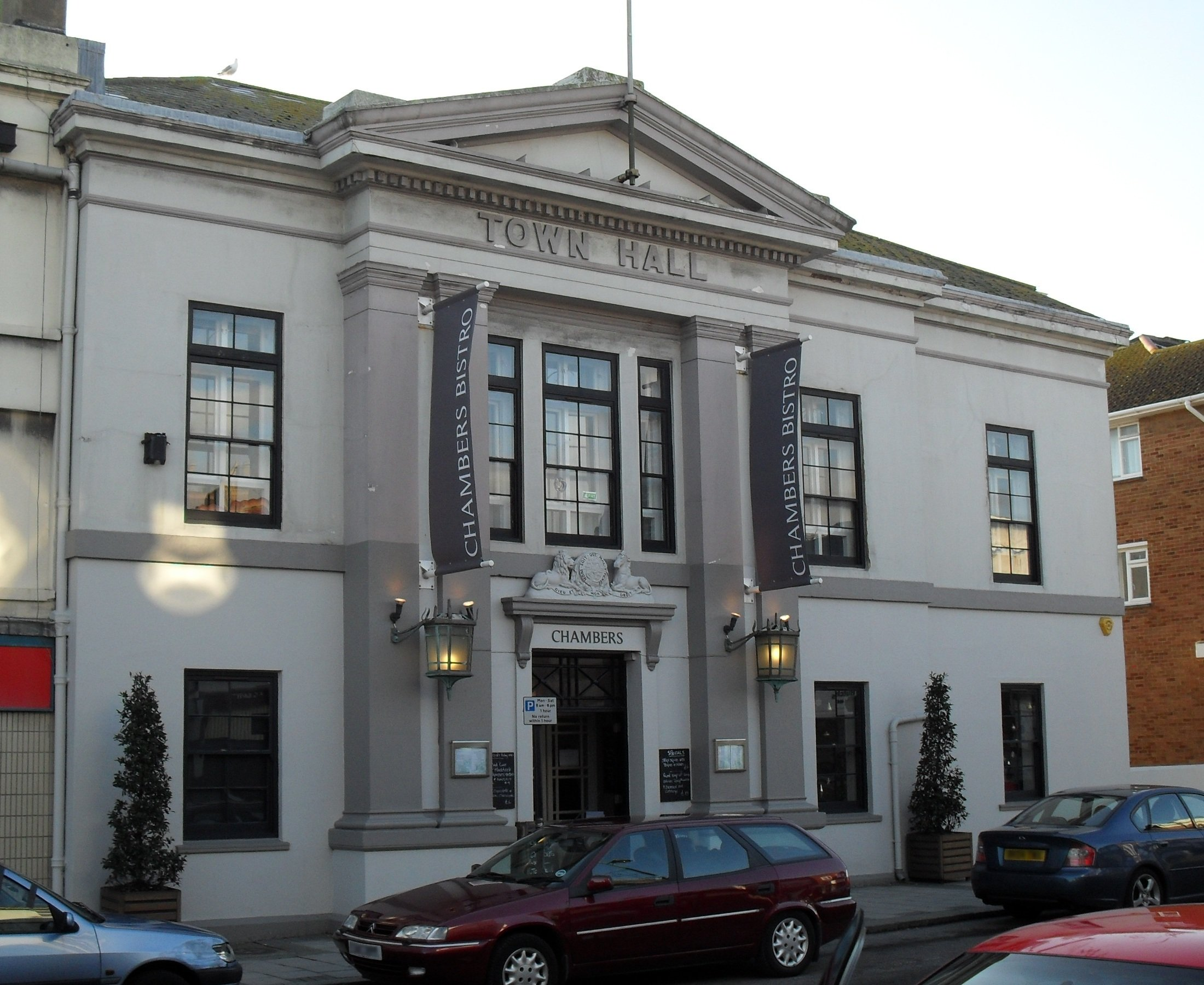
Shoreham Town Hall

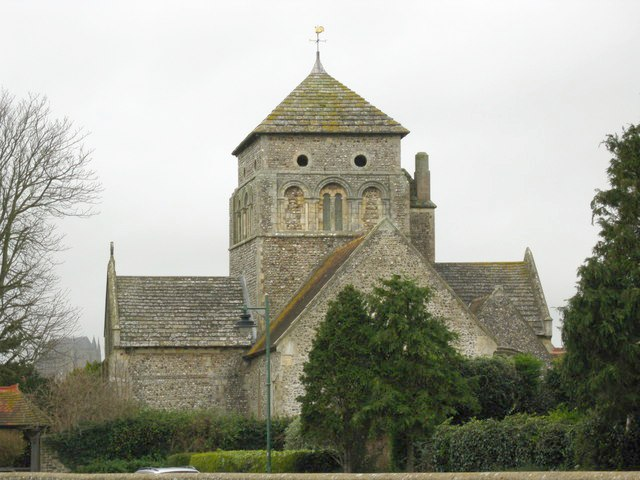
St Nicolas' Church

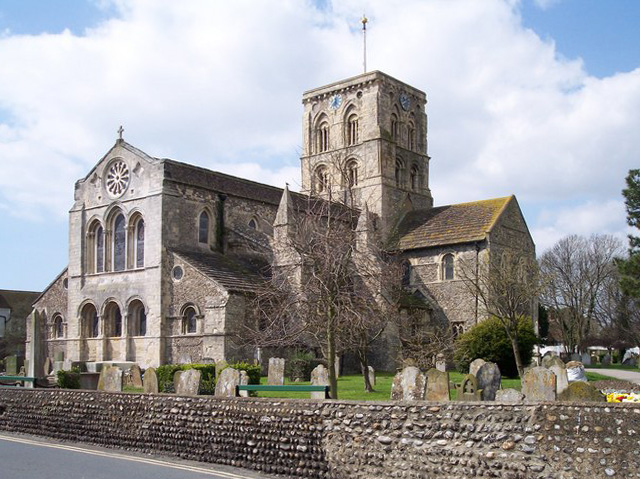
St Mary de Haura Church

Old Shoreham dates back to pre-Roman times. St Nicolas' Church, inland by the River Adur, is partly Anglo-Saxon in its construction. The name of the town has an Old English origin. The town and port of New Shoreham was established by the Norman conquerors towards the end of the 11th century.

St Mary de Haura Church (St Mary of the Haven) was built in the decade following 1103 (the Domesday Book was dated 1086), and around this time the town was laid out on a grid pattern that, in essence, still survives in the town centre. The present church is approximately half the size of the original structure – the former nave was already in ruins by the time of the English Civil War, although evidence of the original west façade survive in the churchyard to this day.

Muslim geographer Muhammad al-Idrisi, writing c. 1153, described Shoreham as "a fine and cultivated city containing buildings and flourishing activity." Shoreham had status as a Royal Port.

The rapid growth of the neighbouring towns of Brighton, Hove and Worthing – and in particular the arrival of the railway in 1840 – prepared the way for Shoreham's rise as a Victorian sea port, with several shipyards and an active coasting trade. Shoreham Harbour remains in commercial operation today. The area became an urban district, with Shoreham Town Hall as its headquarters, in 1910.

== Kingston Buci old village ==
Originally the people of Kingston Buci may have lived at Thundersbarrow. This may have been the centre of a large estate in the post-Roman Dark Ages. However, in early or mid-Saxon times, the people may have re-located down off the hill to Kingston Buci (TQ 235 052), which sits to the east of Shoreham-by-Sea. It has a medieval church, rectory, manor house, and huge old barn which still make it a remarkable cluster – and, like Cissbury (where the people came off the hill to form Findon) and at Mount Caburn (where people re-located down at Beddingham), this stranded settlement is three quarters of a mile from the Downs. The church here was extensively re-modelled in the thirteenth century when the shifting river estuary temporarily made Kingston a port town.

The 'king' of the name 'Kingston' may have referred to a Saxon king of Sussex. The 'Buci' part of the name comes from the Anglo-Norman owners' hometown of Bouce in Normandy.

== Shoreham Beach ==
Shoreham Beach, to the south of the town, is a shingle spit deposited over millennia by longshore drift. This blocks the southerly flow of the River Adur which turns east at this point to discharge into the English Channel further along the coast at a point that has varied considerably over time. During the 17th and 18th centuries, the mouth of the river shifted eastwards which restricted trade to the port; by 1810, it was almost opposite Aldrington church. In 1816, work had been completed to fix the position of the river in its present position, flowing into the sea between two piers. Once the harbour mouth was stabilised, it was defended by Shoreham Fort, which was built in 1857.

Converted railway carriages became summer homes around the start of the 20th century, and 'Bungalow Town', as it was then known, became home to the early British film industry. Francis L. Lyndhurst founded the Sunny South Film Company, which made its first commercial movie on Shoreham Beach in 1912 and built a film studio there. Shoreham Beach officially became part of Shoreham-by-Sea in 1910. Much of the housing in the area was cleared for defence reasons during the Second World War and most of what remained after the war is now long gone, having been replaced by modern houses. The Church of the Good Shepherd, built in 1913, still stands. Along the Adur mud flats adjacent to Shoreham Beach sits (and at high tides floats) a large collection of houseboats made from converted barges, tugs, mine sweepers, and motor torpedo boats. The seaside shingle bank of Shoreham beach extends further east past the harbour mouth, forming the southern boundary of the commercial harbour in Southwick, Portslade, and Hove. The Monarch's Way long-distance footpath, commemorating the escape route of Charles II to France after the Battle of Worcester, follows the beach westwards from Hove past Portslade and Southwick, ending by the harbour mouth's east breakwater.

== Downland areas ==
Notable areas around Southwick

The River Adur, the downs, and the sea support a diverse wildlife flora and fauna in the area. The mudflats support wading birds and gulls, including the ringed plover which attempts to breed on the coastal shingle. The pied wagtail is common in the town in the winter months. Insects include dragonflies over the flood plains of the river. The south- and west-facing downs attract at least 33 species of butterfly, including a nationally important population of the chalkhill blue butterfly on Mill Hill. The underlying rock is chalk on the downs, with alluvium in the old river channels. The Adur district has a variety of habitats in a small area, including natural chalk downs and butterfly meadows, freshwater and reed beds, salt marsh and estuary, brackish water lagoons, woodland, shingle seashore, chalk platform undersea, and large expanses of sand.

Southwick Hill and the smaller sites connected to it are the second biggest surviving complex of ancient Down pasture on the entire plateau of the Brighton Downs (the biggest is around Castle Hill, near Woodingdean).^{:209}

The town is the end-point of the Monarch's Way, a 615-mile (990 km) long-distance footpath, based on the escape route taken by King Charles II in 1651 after being defeated by Cromwell in the Battle of Worcester.

=== Mill Hill ===
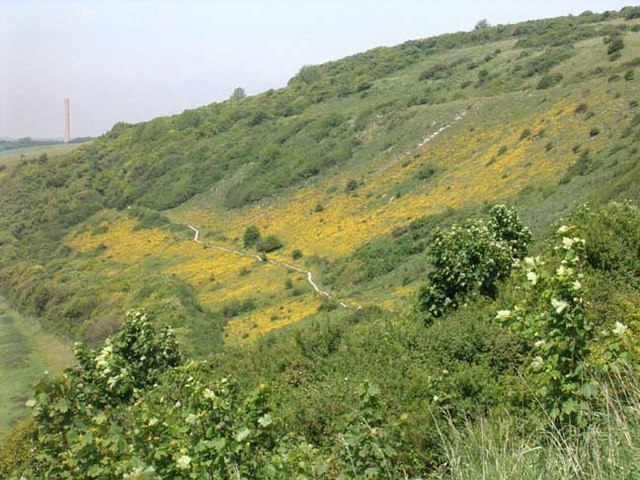
Shoreham Bank (Mill Hill) butterfly site

Mill Hill (TQ 212 071) is also known as Shoreham bank, as the hillside falls sharply to the River Adur. It is a Local Nature Reserve and has been famous for its butterflies since the 1820s. In May, the hillside is dusted yellow with horseshoe vetch: the butterflies' food plant. In August, the hillside is colourful with knapweeds, pink centaury, the tiny white pinpoints of eyebright, and the white umbels of wild carrot, wild parsnip, St John's wort, and wild thyme. The Hill is known for its dingy skippers and grizzled skippers in the spring, and in summer the chalkhill blue and Adonis blue are 'flagship' species of this Hill.

From Mill Hill it is possible to see Applesham Farm, which was a village at the time of the Domesday Book in 1086. To the north end is another Saxon farm, Old Erringham, which King Alfred's successors fortified to defend the estuary. To the south is the Norman church of Old Shoreham, almost on the banks of the Adur, and next to it are the wooden piers of the 1781 toll bridge, which collected traffic tolls up to the 1960s.^{:203}

Mill Hill now suffers from traffic and aircraft noise. The special mosses and lichens have gone, and the Heath and Carthusian snails are now gone. Despite efforts by volunteers and rangers, the hill still carries far too great an area of dense and simplified scrub, which has flourished at the expense of the biodiverse turf.^{:203}

=== Southwick Hill ===
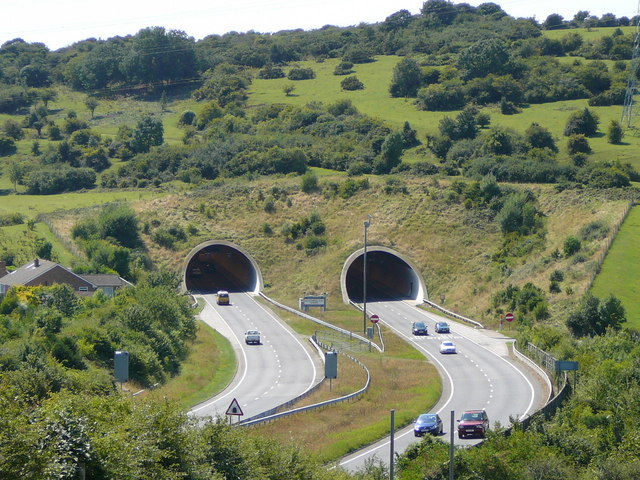
A27 Southwick Hill Tunnels

Southwick Hill (TQ 237 077) is owned by the National Trust and has some special wildlife areas. In 1985, local residents were presented with the plan for the A27 road bypass cutting through the Hill. Through the vigorous campaigning of activists from ABBA (the Anti-Brighton Bypass Association) the road was re-routed through a tunnel under the Hill rather than a cutting through it.

In high summer, on the hill ('bostal') path, there is round-headed rampion, blue scabious, and autumn gentian. On the south side of the bridlepath, there is an un-grazed triangle with a taller sward. Here, there are still rabbits playing on the lawns amongst the purging flax, eggs and bacon, squinancywort, eyebright, and wild thyme, which themselves mingle with tall herb patches of parsnip, greater knapweed, ragwort, hogweed, and St John's wort. There are bushes of raspberry and rose-bay willowherb. Butterflies in the area include common blue, clouded yellow, small heath, comma, red admiral, painted lady, and day-flying moths like treble-bar and dusky sallow. There are glowworms too. In autumn, parts of the short turf may be colourful from the many waxcap and other old meadow fungi. Additional mushrooms include puffballs, blue legs, and velvet shank; fairy rings also form.^{:211}

However, Southwick Hill is not what it was. Until recent years, it was the best place on the Brighton Downs to get a sense of what Down pasture was like during late Victorian and Edwardian times through to 1940. The tenant farmer continuously grazed the whole Hill and, as a result, it was something of a time capsule from a particular period of Downland history, that of the long agricultural depression from 1876 to 1940, when scrub took over many old pastures and cattle replaced many sheep flocks.^{:210} In recent years, however, the Hill has been split by fencing into a southern half which is seriously under-grazed, with simplified tussocky grassland, and a northern half which remains better grazed. The southern half has now lost its close-bitten down pasture, with its flowerings of tiny herbs and fruitings of old pasture fungi. Nevertheless, as a whole the Hill still has a mixture of archaic pasture and scrub thickets, sometimes mature enough to harbour small maiden oaks, and it retains much of the wildlife lost elsewhere on the Brighton Downs.

=== The Crooked Moon Hedge ===
Hedges are very rare on these Downs (except around farmsteads). The Crooked Moon Hedge (TQ 233 070) lies on the top of a prehistoric field lynchet; these southern slopes of Southwick Hill were covered with an Iron Age field system whose banks lay regularly on east–west and south–north axes. At its northern end, it is the boundary between Kingston Buci and Southwick parishes, and at its southern end it bounded Kingston Buci sheep Down to the west, and one of the parish open fields to the east.

The hedge contains a lot of maple and ash and may have been bird-sown. As per Hooper's rule, the hedge is three to four centuries old.^{:209}

=== The 'Rest and Be Thankful' stone ===
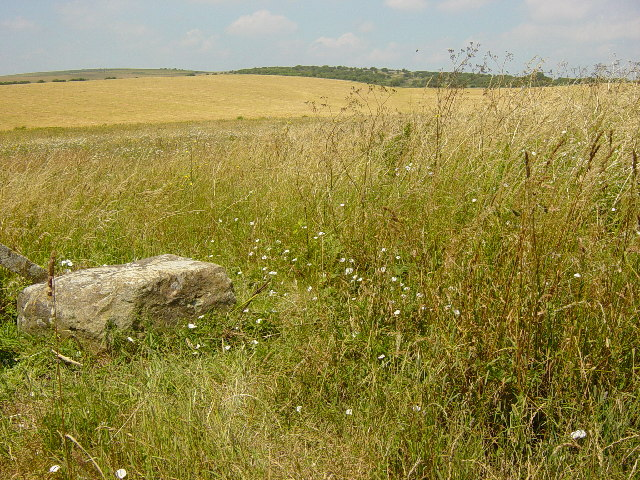
Rest and Be Thankful

There is a large flat block of lichen-covered stone (TQ 238 069) by the path to Southwick Hill from Southwickhill Barn, which marks a corner on the old parish boundary between Kingston Buci and Southwick. It was notable enough to show on the Victorian Ordnance Survey maps.^{:210}

=== Thundersbarrow Hill ===
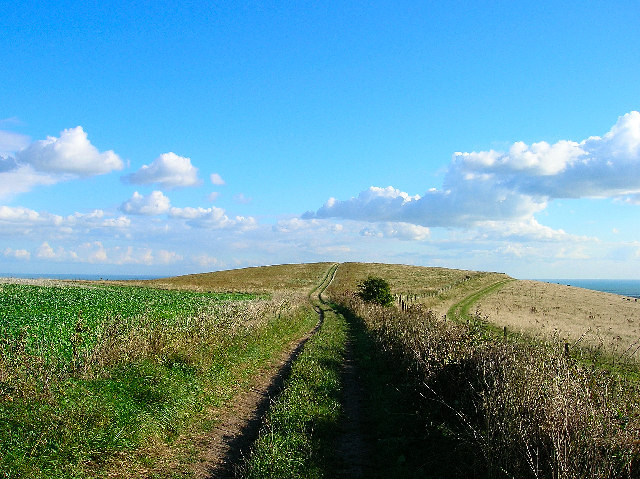
Thundersbarrow Hill

Thunders Barrow (TQ 229 083) is a large barrow, although it was partially dug away on its south side in the nineteenth century to make way for a dew pond. It sits just north of Southwick Hill. The origins of its name are unknown.

It is only at this distance from the bypass that the silence of the Downs and the sound of the birds are bigger than the noise of the road. This point marks the beginning of Downland tranquility. The ramparts of Thundersbarrow's late Bronze Age and Iron Age camp are still tall enough to walk around, although they get a bit vague on the eastern side because of plough damage, and because the Romano-British villagers built their houses just outside the rampart and right up against the barrow on that side. When the village was excavated in 1932, two corn-drying ovens were found, still with soot in the flues and bits of charred grain.

=== Erringham Hole ===
Erringham Hole (TQ 231 082) is the bushy combe to the east of Thundersbarrow, whose Celtic villagers built the huge field lynchets, parts of which are up to 12 feet in height. It was called 'Erringham Hole' because it was part of Old Erringham Farm. Old Erringham Hole (not to be confused with Whitelot Bottom, which is the ploughed land further east down the combe) has flowery chalk grassland, scrub, rank grassland, and lots of rabbits. The rabbits encourage rabbit-resistant plants like tall woolly mullein (complete with mullein moth caterpillars, hound's-tongue, ground ivy, and eyebright. Until 25 years ago, the combe remained substantially open and the ancient lynchet system was plain to see, but cessation of grazing and a lack of scrub control has allowed the species-rich Down pasture to be lost to simplified scrub and even secondary woodland.^{:212}

=== Hazelholt Bottom ===
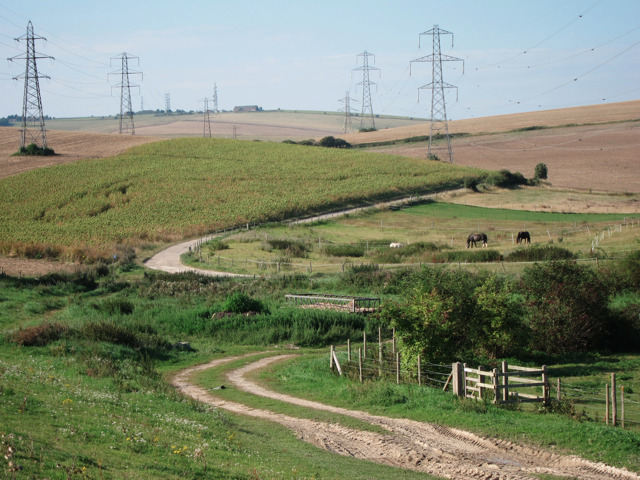
Farmland at Hazelholt Bottom

Hazelholt Bottom (TQ 235 084) is a tranquil slope with large flowery glades. There are often roe deer in the wide corn field below the slope. The National Trust own the south slope and Whitelot Bottom further south, but Whitelot was ploughed up after 1945 and has never been returned to public use.

Hazelholt has rich old chalk grassland with cowslips in spring and devil's-bit scabious in September. In mid-summer, there are many butterflies, including adonis blue and chalkhill blue. At the head of the combe, there are more old grassland and great blackberry thickets. Since 1945, scrub has taken over much of this former open slope. The remaining grassland is only lightly grazed, allowing growth of bramble and thorn and a loss of its ancient down pasture character.^{:212}

=== Freshcombe ===
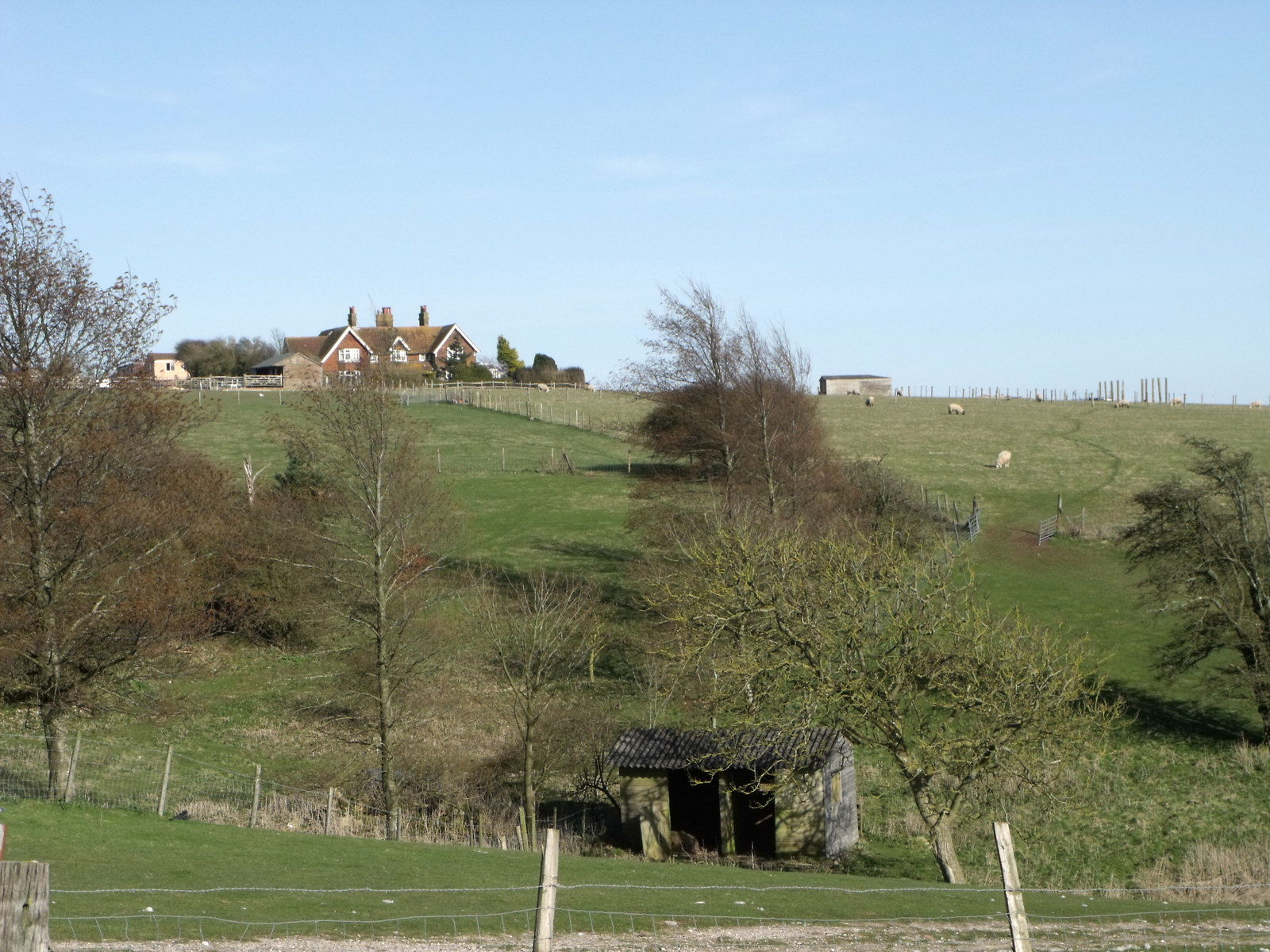
Freshcombe and Summersdene Farm, Truleigh Hill

Freshcombe (TQ 230 092) is owned by the National Trust, but was leased away from their management. It is threatened by scrub expansion and insufficient grazing. Its slopes have very old gorse thickets; they are shown as well-established on the 1873 OS map, and may be centuries older than that.

This is the only site in the South Downs that contains the plant saw-wort, which looks like a slimmer version of knapweed, and still blooms profusely in a little glade amongst the gorse. It is a survivor from the days of the Downland heaths. It survives here because the soil must have a strong clay-with-flints influence. The glade where it blooms also contains flowers of betony, red clover, hawkbit, and St John's wort.^{:213}

=== Old Erringham Farmstead ===
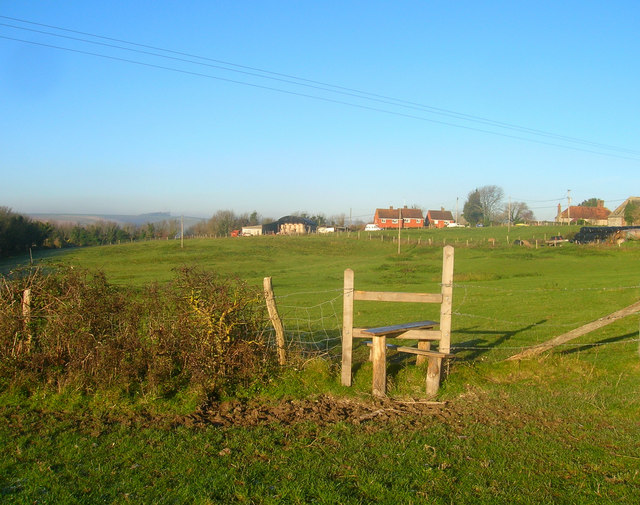
Stile, Old Erringham farm

Old Erringham Farmstead (TQ 205 076) has an old flint farmhouse with great chimneys and part-Horsham slab roofing, and ramshackle old flint barns. It has one of only two remaining medieval manorial chapels on the Brighton Downs (the other at Swanborough Manor), which now functions as a front garden shed for one of the modern farm workers cottages just to the south of the old farmhouse. It has a tiny ecclesiastical window on its south face.

The farm is designated as an ancient monument, incorporating the remains of a medieval settlement and an eleventh century ringwork. It was presumably built as a defence against the Vikings, though it's difficult to pick it out amongst the grassy plats now.

It is a mixed farm with corn crops, beef cattle, a bit of livery stabling, and hay meadows. The farm manages the sites of Old Erringham Combe and Anchor Bottom to preserve their natural value. Around the farmstead there is red star-thistle (a Brighton Downs speciality), musk thistle, spear thistle, welted thistle, creeping thistle, teasel, and viper's bugloss, all adding summer colour.^{:204}

=== Old Erringham Combe and Shaw ===
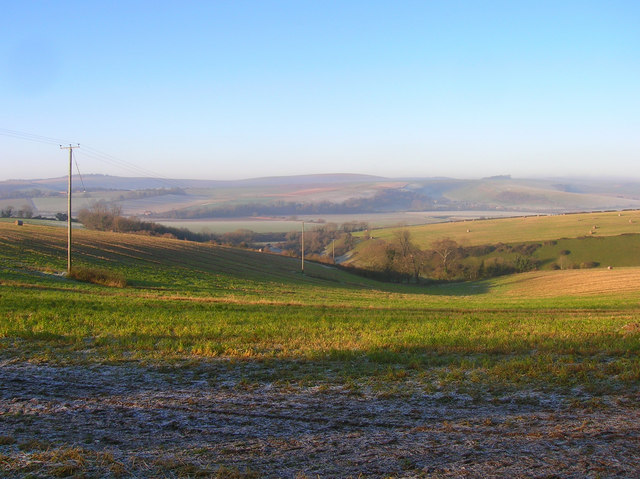
Downland near Erringham

Old Erringham Combe (TQ 205 081) is an old-fashioned mosaic of habitats, making it a great refuge for Downland wildlife. The south-facing bank is the hottest place, but below it there are willows and a tiny tongue of wet grassland where lesser marsh grasshopper, autumn lady's-tresses orchid, bastard toadflax, rockrose, betony, wild thyme, and other herbs grow.^{:205}

Summer butterflies in the area include wall brown and clouded yellow, and day-flying moths like yellow belle, dusky sallow, common carpet, and grass moths enjoy the drying grassland. The rare Carthusian snail (Monacha cartusiana) still exists in this combe, possibly due to centuries of cattle grazing.^{:205}

Old Erringham Shaw is a tangled wood of sycamore, ash, elm, and thorn. It's more open at the northern end, which faces the combe, where the remains of four big old broken beeches and lots of may blossom make it a good place for insects.^{:205}

=== Slonk Hill ===
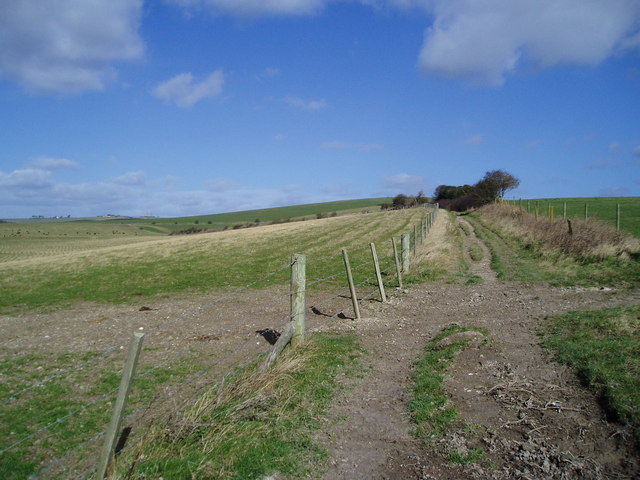
Track between Slonk Hill Farm and Mossy Bottom Barn

Slonk Hill (TQ 222 070): there were at least two Bronze Age barrows and a little Iron Age settlement on the Hill. They were surrounded by a rectangular ditched enclosure and perhaps made into a 'temenos' or temple. Ritual deposits of animals and coins were buried at the site.^{:122} Evening shadows reveal dips and hummocks at the Hill's southern end, although they are probably due to the trench digging of the large army camp that came here during the First World War.

There are three places that were spared the damage of decades of agribusiness on the hill: an island of old Down pasture on the eastern slope, an old bostal track, which winds down the slope at its southern end, and a patch of hillside a few hundred yards north, surrounded by Iron Age field lynchets. More recently, the use of agrochemicals has stopped, and the hillside is again colourful with herbs. The intact areas have pyramidal orchid, spotted orchid, meadow oat-grass, crested hair-grass, and round-headed rampion.^{:206}

=== Mossy Bottom ===
Mossy Bottom (TQ 226 082) derives its name from 'Muster' Bottom, where the shepherd mustered his sheep. Mossy Bottom slope is statutory access land under the right to roam 'CROW' Act (2000), but public usage is heavily challenged by prohibitive notices and poor access provision. It has boney Iron Age lynchets across it made by the peasant farmers who lived in Thundersbarrow village. They used to be called "Thunder's Steps." There are big old anthills, and plants such as large thyme, dropwort, cowslip, basil, harebell, and round-headed rampion.^{:206}

== Transport ==
Shoreham Airport (also known as Brighton City Airport) lies to the west of the main town and has been in private ownership since 2006. It is the UK's oldest licensed airport still in operation and has a 1936 Grade II*-listed Art Deco terminal building. The terminal has been a filming location for an episode of Agatha Christie's Poirot ("Lord Edgware Dies"), a Crimewatch-type reconstruction (2000, ITV Meridian), BBC Tenko series episode, scenes of The Da Vinci Code, and the film Woman in Gold.

The town is served by Shoreham-by-Sea railway station, located on the West Coastway Line.

Local bus services are provided by the Brighton & Hove bus company, Stagecoach South, and a local town route is operated by Compass Travel.

Shoreham Tollbridge crosses the River Adur in the west of the town. This bridge is a Grade II* listed building and was the last Sussex toll bridge in use. The bridge was part of the A27 road until it was closed to traffic in 1968. The structure is now too weak to carry vehicles and underwent extensive restoration, then was ceremonially re-opened for pedestrians on 23 October 2008, by the then Prince Andrew, Duke of York (later Andrew Mountbatten-Windsor). Adur Ferry Bridge in the south of the town (replacing the old Shoreham footbridge) crosses the River Adur to Shoreham Beach. It was opened to the public by the Duke of Gloucester on 13 November 2013.

== Local media ==
Local news and television programmes is provided by BBC South East and ITV Meridian. Television signals are received from the Whitehawk Hill TV transmitter. The town’s local radio stations are BBC Radio Sussex on 95.3 FM, Heart South on 103.5 FM, More Radio Worthing on 107.7 FM and Seaside Hospital Radio that broadcast from the Southlands Hospital in Shoreham. Local newspapers are the Shoreham Herald, West Sussex Gazette and The Argus. INSIDE Shoreham & Southwick started in 2005 and is a free A5 magazine that goes to houses in Shoreham and neighbouring Southwick each month and carries articles about local people, local history as well as upcoming events and topics of local interest. It is supported by local businesses who advertise in the publication.

== Sport and leisure ==
Shoreham-by-Sea has a non-League football club, Shoreham FC, who play at Middle Road stadium with a 2,000-seat capacity, and a rugby union club, Shoreham RFC, who play at Buckingham Park.

Southdown Golf Club was founded in 1902, but ceased to operate in the 1940s.

Shoreham is home to a detachment of the Sussex Army Cadet Force, a volunteer youth organisation, sponsored by the Ministry of Defence, which accepts cadets aged between 12 and 18 years of age.

The town centre hosts monthly farmers' and artisans' markets in East Street on the second and fourth Saturday of the month, respectively, together with the annual 'Light up Shoreham' Christmas market and event.

== Climate ==
Climate data for Shoreham Airport (ESH) (1991–2020 normals)
| Month | Jan | Feb | Mar | Apr | May | Jun | Jul | Aug | Sep | Oct | Nov | Dec | Year |
|---|---|---|---|---|---|---|---|---|---|---|---|---|---|
| Record high °C (°F) | 14.4 (57.9) | 16.5 (61.7) | 19.6 (67.3) | 24.2 (75.6) | 28.6 (83.5) | 29.5 (85.1) | 33.4 (92.1) | 33.2 (91.8) | 29.4 (84.9) | 23.0 (73.4) | 17.8 (64.0) | 14.1 (57.4) | 33.4 (92.1) |
| Mean daily maximum °C (°F) | 8.2 (46.8) | 8.4 (47.1) | 10.5 (50.9) | 13.1 (55.6) | 16.3 (61.3) | 19.1 (66.4) | 20.9 (69.6) | 21.0 (69.8) | 18.9 (66.0) | 15.5 (59.9) | 11.6 (52.9) | 8.9 (48.0) | 14.4 (57.9) |
| Daily mean °C (°F) | 5.3 (41.5) | 5.3 (41.5) | 7.0 (44.6) | 9.1 (48.4) | 12.2 (54.0) | 15.0 (59.0) | 17.0 (62.6) | 17.0 (62.6) | 14.9 (58.8) | 11.9 (53.4) | 8.4 (47.1) | 5.8 (42.4) | 10.8 (51.4) |
| Mean daily minimum °C (°F) | 2.4 (36.3) | 2.3 (36.1) | 3.6 (38.5) | 5.2 (41.4) | 8.1 (46.6) | 11.0 (51.8) | 13.0 (55.4) | 13.1 (55.6) | 10.9 (51.6) | 8.4 (47.1) | 5.2 (41.4) | 2.8 (37.0) | 7.2 (45.0) |
| Record low °C (°F) | −8.4 (16.9) | −2.8 (27.0) | −6.7 (19.9) | −4.2 (24.4) | −0.5 (31.1) | 3.2 (37.8) | 6.5 (43.7) | 5.0 (41.0) | 2.1 (35.8) | −3.2 (26.2) | −4.1 (24.6) | −10.3 (13.5) | −10.3 (13.5) |
| Average precipitation mm (inches) | 80.5 (3.17) | 56.7 (2.23) | 45.7 (1.80) | 45.1 (1.78) | 45.9 (1.81) | 46.7 (1.84) | 54.2 (2.13) | 58.7 (2.31) | 59.1 (2.33) | 82.2 (3.24) | 90.4 (3.56) | 87.5 (3.44) | 752.6 (29.63) |
| Average precipitation days (≥ 1.0 mm) | 12.7 | 10.3 | 9.0 | 9.1 | 8.3 | 7.7 | 7.6 | 8.5 | 8.2 | 11.6 | 13.1 | 12.6 | 118.8 |
Source 1: Met Office
Source 2: Starlings Roost Weather

== Airshow crash ==
Most years, in late summer, Shoreham Airport hosted the Royal Air Forces Association (RAFA) Shoreham Airshow. On 22 August 2015, a Hawker Hunter jet fighter taking part in the airshow crashed onto the busy A27 road just outside the airport, killing eleven people and injuring several others.

== Notable people ==
- Writer Brian Behan lived on a boat moored in the town in the late 1960s.
- Playwright Charles Bennett was born in Shoreham-by-sea in 1899.
- Mark Benson, former England cricketer and now a cricket umpire, was born in Shoreham-by-Sea in 1958.
- Havergal Brian, English composer, moved from London to Shoreham-by-Sea in 1958. He wrote twenty symphonies there over the next ten years.
- Paul Chaloner, shoutcaster in the Esports community, was born in Shoreham in 1971.
- Raymond O. Faulkner, philologist and compiler of the standard hieroglyphic dictionary, was born in Shoreham in 1894.
- Vanessa Howard, a horror and exploitation film actress, was born in Shoreham-by-Sea in 1948.
- Mel Hopkins, a former footballer with Tottenham Hotspur, Brighton and Hove Albion and Wales retired to Shoreham Beach.
- Artist Alison Lapper lives in Shoreham.
- Bert Longstaff, professional footballer who played for Shoreham F.C. and made over 400 appearances for Brighton & Hove Albion.
- Broadcaster Mike Mendoza lives on Shoreham Beach.
- Comedian Max Miller, lived in Kingston Lane for a period of time as indicated by a plaque on the building called Ashcroft.
- ITN journalist and TV presenter Ed Mitchell moved to Shoreham in 2010.
- Fiona Mont, who was dubbed "Britain's most wanted woman" in 2000. It was claimed she was smuggled out of the country in a light aircraft from Shoreham Airport in 1999.
- Kjetil Mørland of the band Absent Elk lives in Shoreham-by-Sea.
- Actor Luke Newton was born in Shoreham-by-Sea in 1993.
- Hugh Nicol (1898-1972), bacteriologist and agricultural chemist.
- Cecil Pashley, aviation pioneer.
- Phyllis Pearsall, painter, writer, and creator of the Geographers' A–Z Street Atlas of London, lived on Shoreham Beach before her death in 1996.
- Harry Ricardo founded Ricardo Consulting Engineers in Shoreham-by-Sea, where it still has its main offices.
- Captain Henry Roberts (1725–1796) was a native of Shoreham, where he raised his six children. He sailed with Captain James Cook on the second and third voyages and acted as cartographer.
- David Ryall, actor, was born in the town in 1935.
- Leo Sayer, British singer and recording artist, was born in 1948 in Shoreham-by-Sea.
- Hubert Scott-Paine, aircraft and boat designer, was born in 1890 in Shoreham and had a yacht in Stowe's Yard, before moving to Southampton.
- Gemma Spofforth, Olympic swimmer, was born in Shoreham.
- Michael Standing, a professional footballer, was born in Shoreham-by-Sea in 1981.
- James Francis Stephens (1792–1852), entomologist
- Marcus Tudgay, footballer, was born in Shoreham-by-Sea.
- Darren Tulett, football presenter on French television.
- Judy Upton, playwright, was born in Shoreham-by-Sea in 1966 and has written several plays associated with Brighton.
- Nicholas van Hoogstraten, notorious British property tycoon, was born in Shoreham-by-Sea in 1946 and was educated at a local Jesuit school.
- Ted Walker, writer, was married in Shoreham. Many works describe the Shoreham coastline and Adur estuary.
- Amon Henry Wilds, English architect, moved to Old Shoreham in 1857.
- Nathaniel Woodard, the founder of Lancing College and the Woodard Schools, became the curate-in-charge of St. Mary's, New Shoreham in 1846. His experience there inspired him to create schools to improve the level of middle-class education. He also greatly developed the use of choral music in the Church.
- Carol Cleveland best known for her work with Monty Python has lived in Shoreham since 2010

== Twin towns ==
Shoreham (along with the other urban districts of Adur) is twinned with:

- Żywiec, Poland
- Riom, France

== See also ==
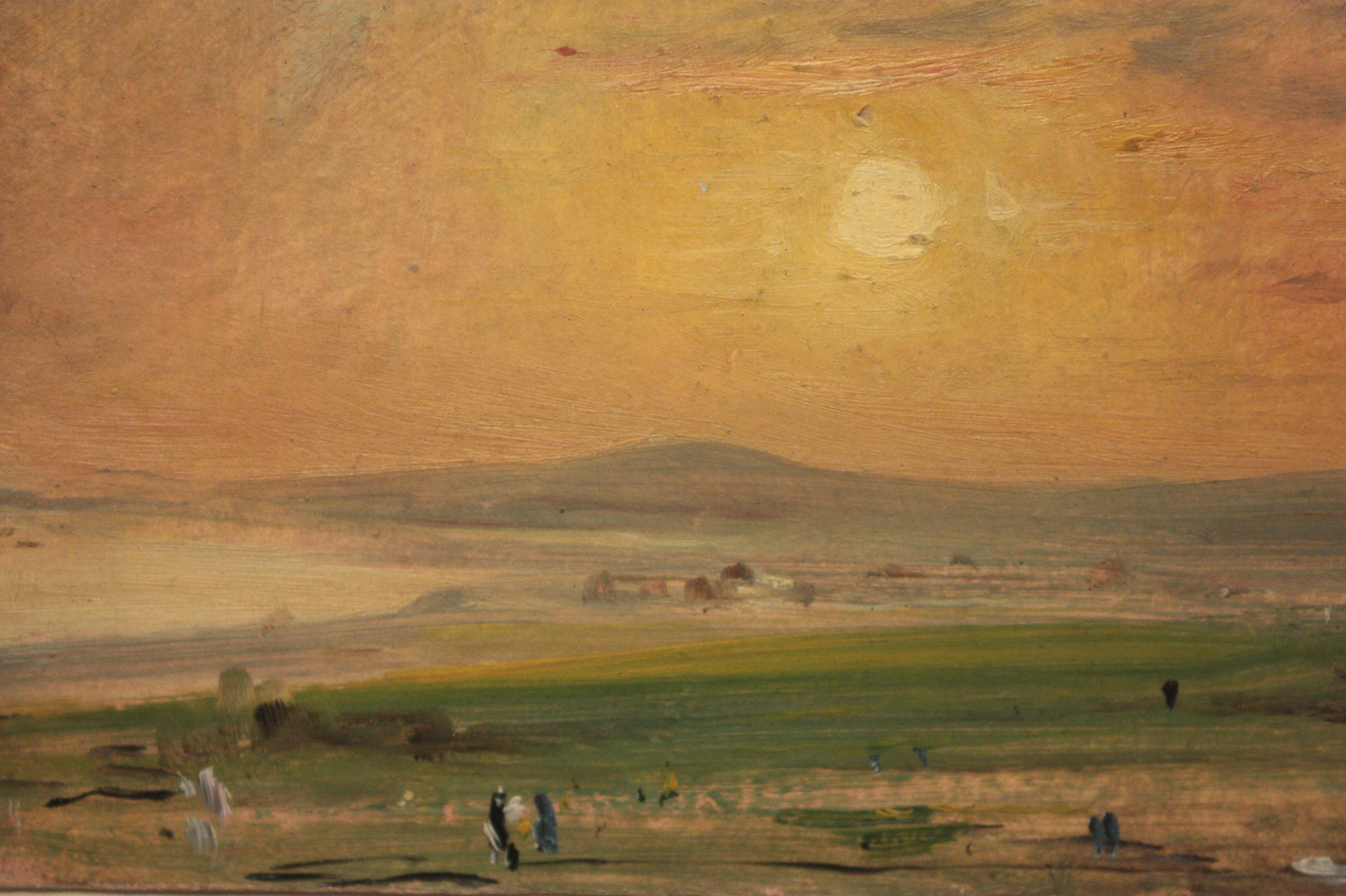
Shoreham Bay by John Constable (1828)

- Marlipins Museum
- Red Lion Inn, Shoreham-by-Sea
- Shoreham Harbour Lifeboat Station
- Southlands Hospital
