= Shoreham Town Hall =

Municipal building in Shoreham, West Sussex, England

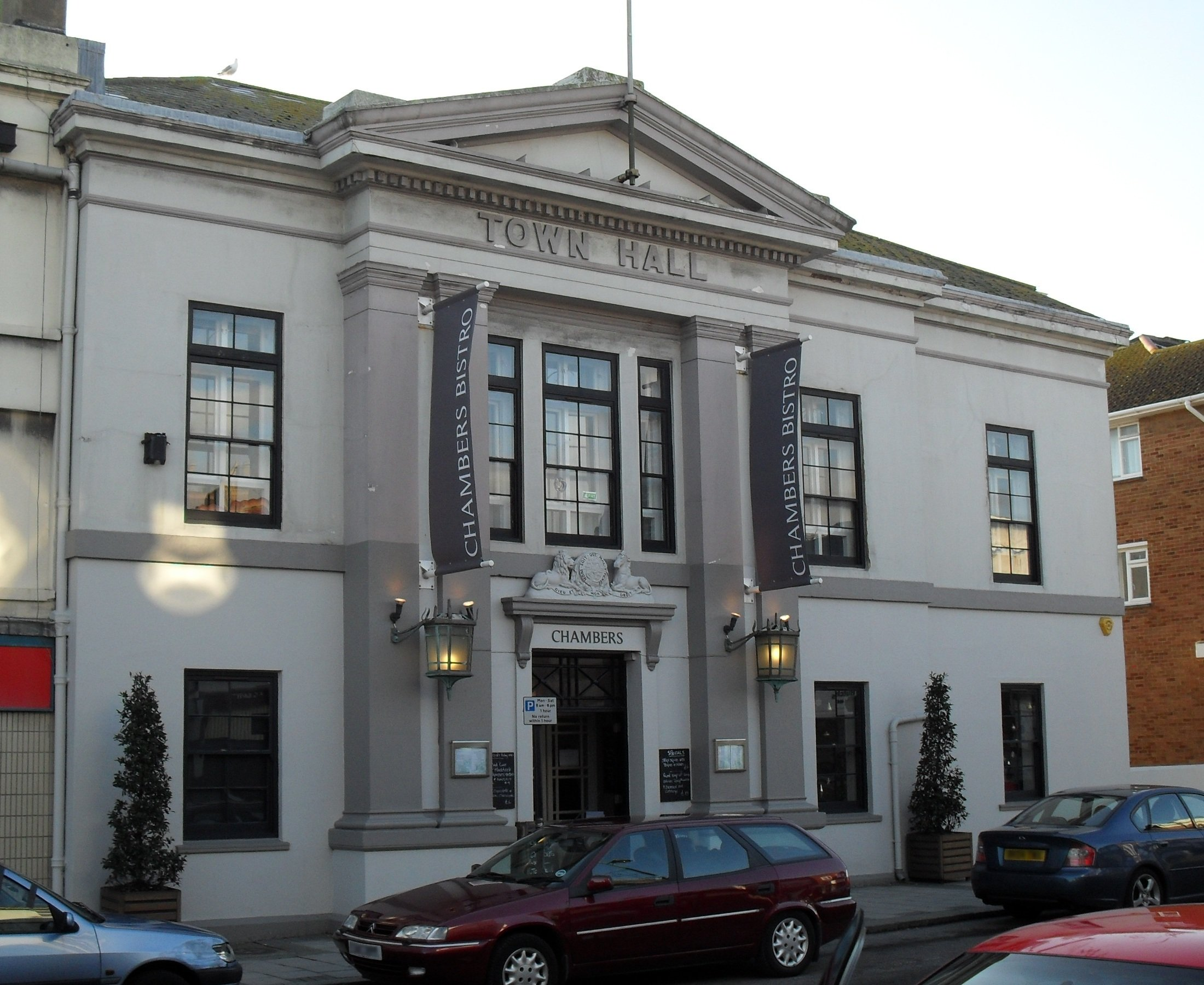
- Shoreham Town Hall

- Shown in West Sussex
- 50.8319°N 0.2768°W
- Location: High Street, Shoreham-by-Sea

History
- Built: 1830

Site notes
- Architect: Sydney Smirke
- Architectural style: Neoclassical style

Listed Building – Grade II
- Official name: Town Hall
- Designated: 29 September 1972
- Reference no.: 1027866

Shoreham Town Hall is a municipal building in the High Street, Shoreham-by-Sea, West Sussex, England. The town hall, which was the headquarters of Shoreham-by-Sea Urban District Council, is a Grade II listed building.

== History ==
The current building has its origins in a 16th customs house in Church Street, which contained a vault which was originally used for the storage of bonded goods and latterly was used for the storage of wines. After becoming dilapidated and being replaced by the current building, the old customs house was demolished in the mid-19th century.

In the 1820s, a local landowner, George Henry Hooper, decided to augment his estate by erecting a new customs house: the site he selected had been occupied by a mansion owned by the Poole family. The new building was designed by Sydney Smirke in the neoclassical style, built of brick with a stucco coating and was completed in 1830. The original design involved a symmetrical main frontage with three bays facing onto the High Street: the middle bay featured a doorway with brackets supporting a canopy bearing Royal coat of arms of King William IV on the ground floor and a three-light casement window on the first floor. The doorway was flanked by pairs of full-height pilasters supporting an entablature, a cornice with modillions and a large pediment.

After the customs office moved to Southwick in 1880, the building was acquired by the local board of health, which had previously been using premises in East Street; after conversion for municipal use, it was officially re-opened by the member of parliament for Lewes, Sir Henry Aubrey-Fletcher, as Shoreham Town Hall on 18 August 1890. It also extended by one extra bay to the west, recessed from the rest of the frontage, around that time.

Following significant population growth, mainly associated with seaside tourism, the area became an urban district, with the town hall as its headquarters, in 1910. The building was substantially extended to the rear in 1920 and an ornate oak fireplace which had previously been located in the Fountain Inn, a building which adjoined the local shipbuilding yard, was installed in the town hall at that time.

The town continued to serve as the headquarters of Shoreham-by-Sea Urban District Council for much of the 20th century but ceased to be the local seat of government after the enlarged Adur District Council, which had been formed in 1974, moved to the new civic centre on Ham Road in 1980. The town hall was subsequently converted for commercial use with a restaurant on the ground floor and a gym on the first floor.

== See also ==
- Listed buildings in Adur
