= Nutborne Marshes =

Nature reserve in West Sussex, England

Coordinates: 50.822°N 0.900°W

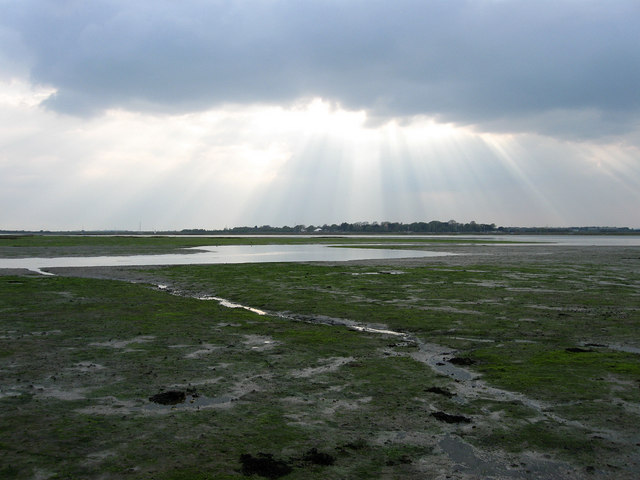
- Interactive map of Nutborne Marshes
- Type: Local Nature Reserve
- Location: Thorney Island, West Sussex
- OS grid: SU 776 031
- Area: 386.9 hectares (956 acres)
- Manager: Chichester Harbour Conservancy

Nutborne Marshes is a 386.9-hectare (956-acre) Local Nature Reserve east of Thorney Island in West Sussex. It is owned and managed by Chichester Harbour Conservancy. It is part of the Chichester Harbour Site of Special Scientific Interest and Nature Conservation Review site, Grade I*, the Chichester and Langstone Harbours Ramsar site and Special Protection Area, and the Solent Maritime Special Area of Conservation.

This is an area of intertidal and subtidal saltmarsh and mudflats. There are many invertebrates on the mudflats such as ragworms and the banks have unusual plants including sea wormwood. Migrating birds include curlews, grey plovers and dunlins.

There is no access to the site but it can be viewed from a footpath.
