= Mill Hill, Shoreham =

Nature reserve in West Sussex, England

Coordinates: 50.853°N 0.281°W

Mill Hill
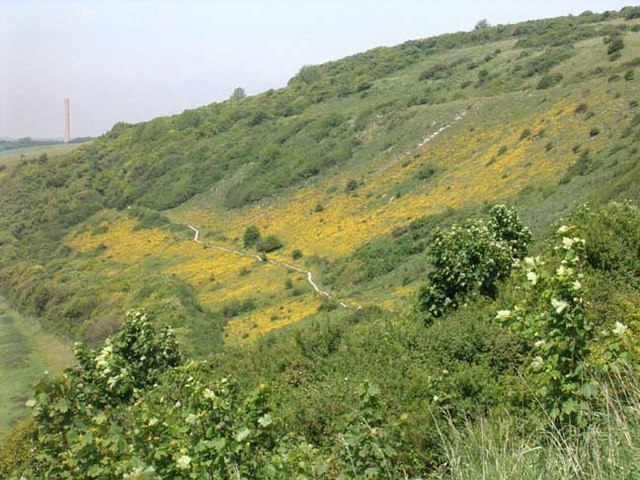
- Interactive map of Mill Hill
- Type: Local Nature Reserve
- Location: Shoreham-by-Sea, West Sussex
- OS grid: TQ 211 073
- Area: 13.5 hectares (33 acres)
- Manager: Adur District Council

Mill Hill is a 13.5-hectare (33-acre) Local Nature Reserve on the northern outskirts of Shoreham-by-Sea in West Sussex. It is owned by Adur District Council and managed by the council and the South Downs Joint Committee.

This site has chalk grassland, scrub and secondary woodland. More than 160 species of flowering plant have been recorded, such as horseshoe vetch.

There is access from the road called Mill Hill.
