= Shoreham Beach =

Nature reserve in West Sussex, England

Coordinates: 50.826°N 0.271°W

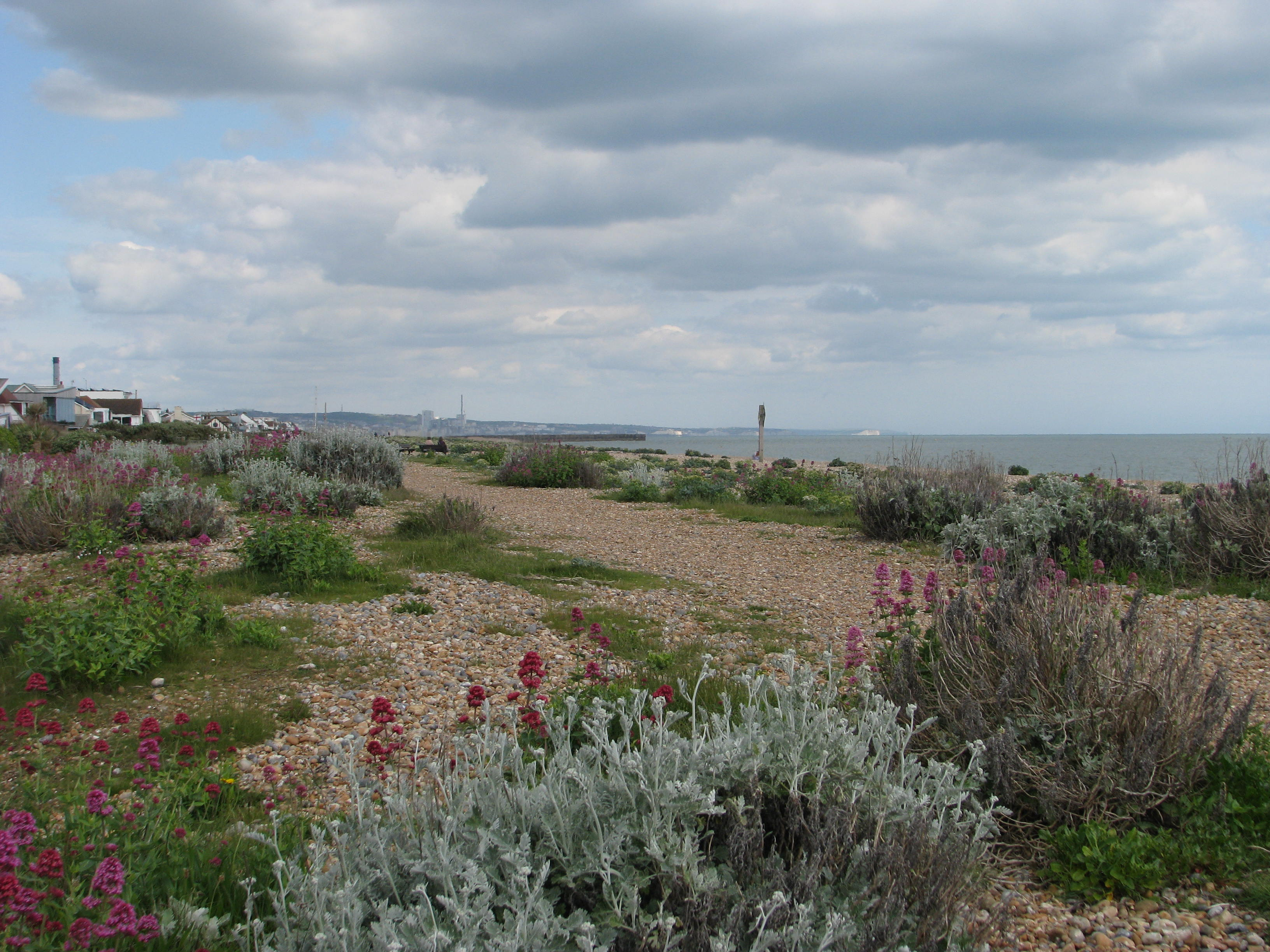
- Interactive map of Shoreham Beach
- Type: Local Nature Reserve
- Location: Shoreham-by-Sea, West Sussex
- OS grid: TQ 219 044
- Area: 26.2 hectares (65 acres)
- Manager: Adur District Council

Shoreham Beach is a 26.2-hectare (65-acre) Local Nature Reserve in Shoreham-by-Sea in West Sussex. It is owned and managed by Adur District Council.

The beach has vegetated shingle, which is an internationally rare habitat, with flora including yellow horned poppy, sea kale and curled dock.

== Boardwalk ==
In 2011, Adur District Council installed the first section of a boardwalk along the beach which connected Ferry road and Shingle road. However, this included a 20-metre gap due to a dispute between the council and a property fronting the beach. In 2014, the gap was filled in, resulting in the completion of the first phase of the boardwalk. The second phase of development for the boardwalk was completed in 2015 as the boardwalk was extended further from Shingle road to The Burrells with an intersection created that would allow access adjacent to Winterton way. By 2018 the third phase of development was completed, this time extending the footpath to Forthaven. The 1.2 kilometre footpath could yet be extended further with phase four planning to extend the boardwalk from Ferry road west towards Beach green.
