= Warnham LNR =

Nature reserve in West Sussex, England

Coordinates: 51.082°N 0.330°W

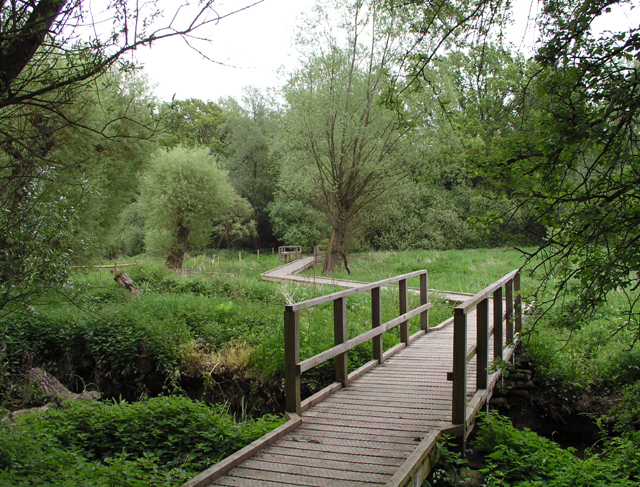
- Interactive map of Warnham LNR
- Type: Local Nature Reserve
- Location: , West Sussex
- OS grid: TQ 171 327
- Area: 38.4 hectares (95 acres)
- Manager: Horsham District Council

Warnham LNR is a 38.4-hectare (95-acre) Local Nature Reserve in Horsham in West Sussex. It is owned and managed by Horsham District Council.

The principal feature of the site is the 7-hectare (17-acre) Warnham Millpond, together with its islands and marginal vegetation. Boldings Brook runs through the site and in the winter it floods areas of wet grassland and willow carr. Invertebrates including 523 species of moths and 366 plant species have been recorded.

There is access from Warnham Road.
