= Ashenground and Bolnore Woods =

Nature reserve in West Sussex, England

Coordinates: 50.990°N 0.116°W

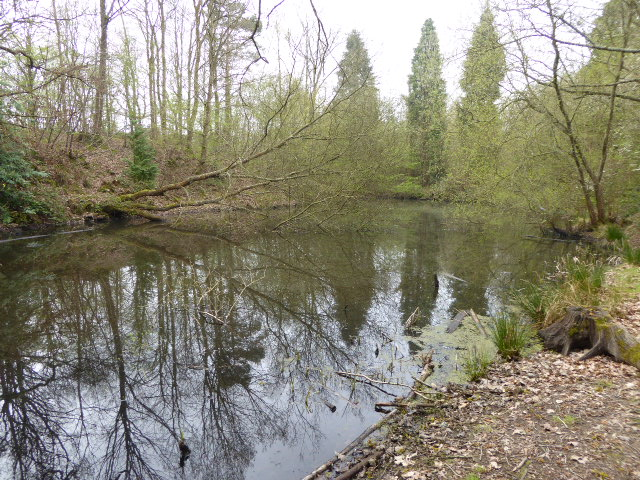
- Pond in Bolnore Wood
- Interactive map of Ashenground and Bolnore Woods
- Type: Local Nature Reserve
- Location: Haywards Heath, West Sussex
- OS grid: TQ 323 229
- Area: 14.4 hectares (36 acres)
- Manager: Mid Sussex District Council

Ashenground and Bolnore Woods is a 14.4-hectare (36-acre) Local Nature Reserve in Haywards Heath in West Sussex. It is owned and managed by Mid Sussex District Council.

These woods have oak, beech and field maple, together with old coppice hornbeam, ash and hazel. Fauna include bats, woodpeckers and owls.

Both woods are open to the public.
