= Target Hill Park =

Nature reserve in Crawley, West Sussex, England

Coordinates: 51.097°N 0.218°W

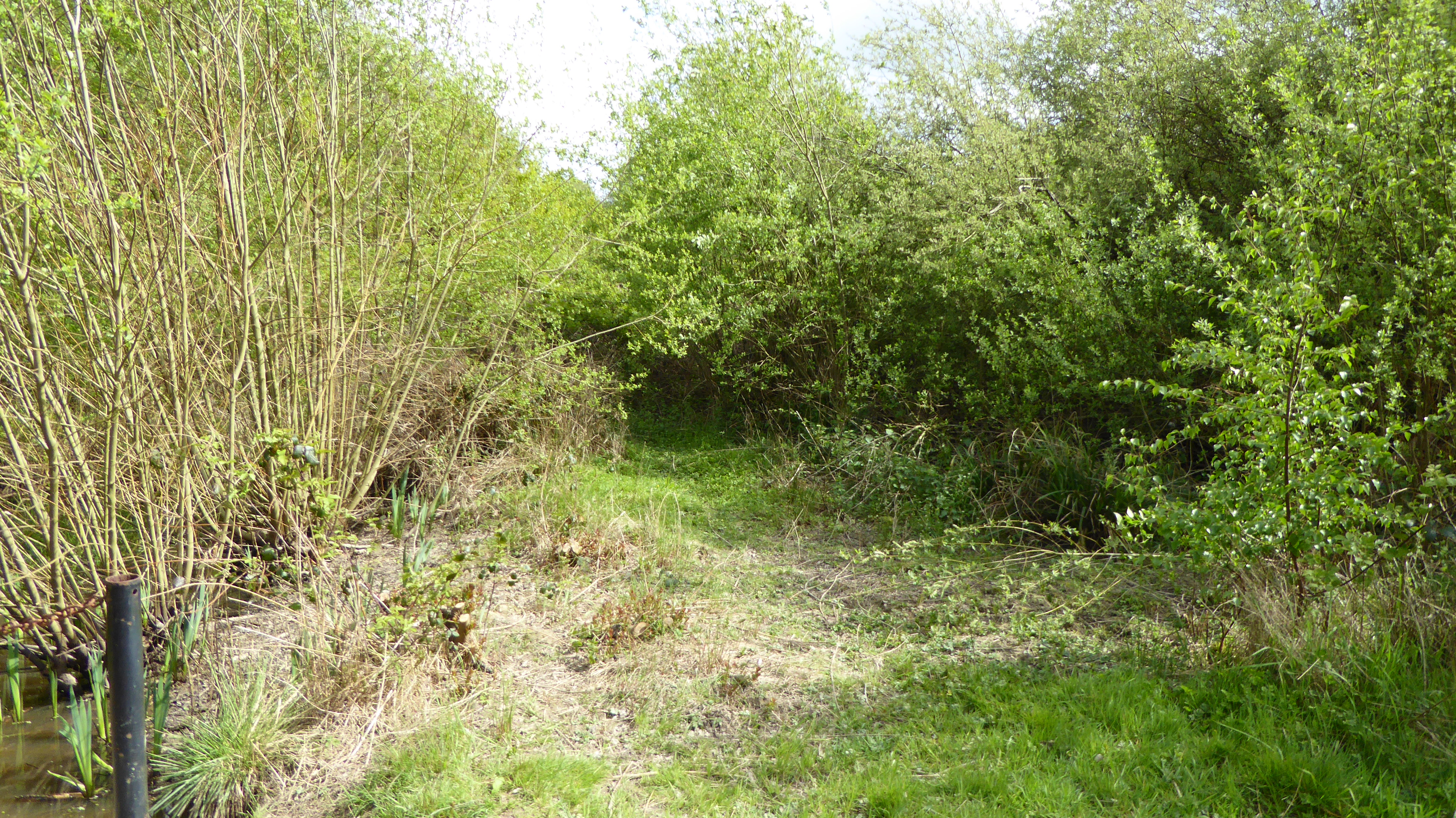
- Interactive map of Target Hill Park
- Type: Local Nature Reserve
- Location: Crawley, West Sussex
- OS grid: TQ 249 346
- Area: 9.0 hectares (22 acres)
- Manager: Crawley Borough Council

Target Hill Park is a 9-hectare (22-acre) Local Nature Reserve in Crawley in West Sussex. It is owned by Crawley Borough Council and managed by the council and Gatwick Greenspace Partnership.

The diverse habitats in this park include ponds, wetlands, woodlands, meadows and scrub. There are reptiles such as slow-worms, adders and common lizards, while butterflies include skippers, meadow brown, small heaths and ringlets.

There is access from Buchan Country Park and Hobbs Road.
