= Tottington Wood =

Local nature reserve in West Sussex

Coordinates: 50.900°N 0.272°W

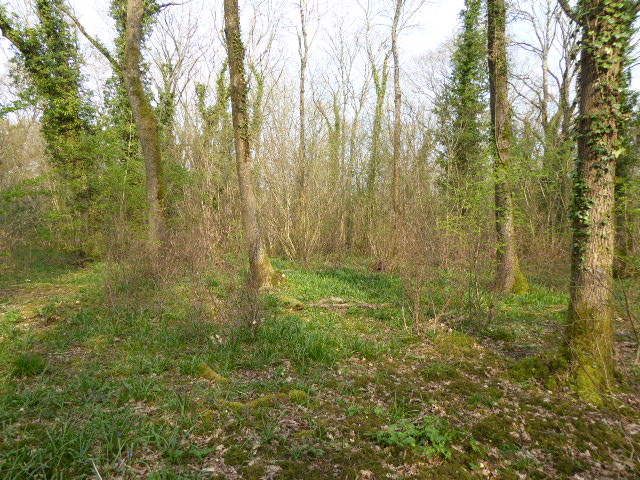
- Interactive map of Tottington Wood
- Type: Local Nature Reserve
- Location: Small Dole, West Sussex
- OS grid: TQ 216 126
- Area: 5.1 hectares (13 acres)
- Manager: The Tottington Woodlanders

Tottington Wood is a 5.1-hectare (13-acre) Local Nature Reserve in Small Dole in West Sussex. It is owned by Hopegar Properties and managed by The Tottington Woodlanders.

This semi-ancient wood is recorded back to 1600 and it has an oak tree which is over 250 years old. Mammals include roe deer and bats and there are birds such as woodpeckers and blue tits.

There is access by a footpath from Henfield Road.
