= Eames Farm =

Nature reserve in West Sussex

Coordinates: 50.833°N 0.926°W

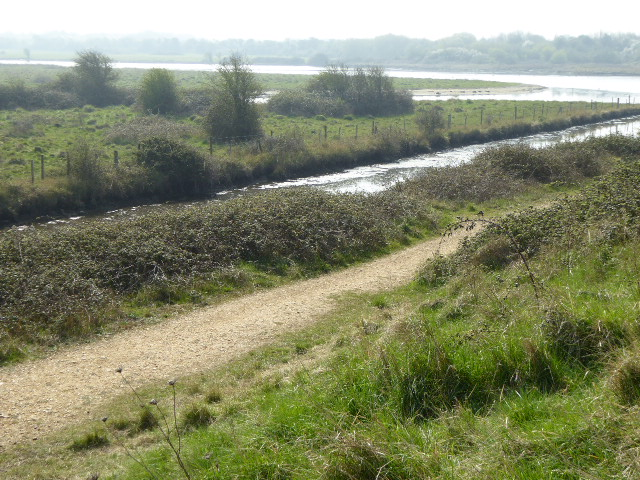
- Interactive map of Eames Farm
- Type: Local Nature Reserve
- Location: Thorney Island, West Sussex
- OS grid: SU 757 043
- Area: 132.5 hectares (327 acres)
- Manager: Chichester Harbour Conservancy

Eames Farm is a 132.5-hectare (327-acre) Local Nature Reserve on Thorney Island in West Sussex. It is owned by the Chichester Harbour Conservancy, West Sussex County Council and the Ministry of Defence and managed by the Chichester Harbour Conservancy. It is part of Chichester and Langstone Harbours Ramsar site and Special Protection Area and Chichester Harbour Site of Special Scientific Interest.

This area of grazing marsh, wetland and reedbed is managed as an organic farm. It has many rare plants and insects and a diverse variety of migrating waders and wildfowl.

The site is private land with no public access.
