= The Brooks Local Nature Reserve =

English park

Coordinates: 50.805°N 0.676°W

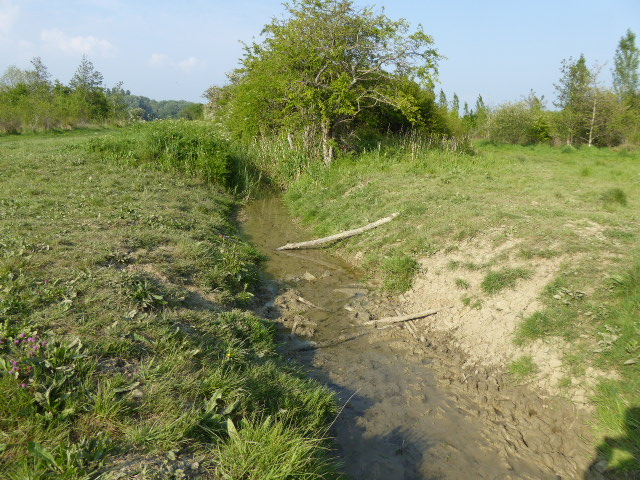
- Interactive map of The Brooks Local Nature Reserve
- Type: Local Nature Reserve
- Location: Bognor Regis, West Sussex
- OS grid: SU 934 014
- Area: 19.1 hectares (47 acres)
- Manager: Arun District Council

The Brooks Local Nature Reserve is a 19.1-hectare (47-acre) Local Nature Reserve on the northern outskirts of Bognor Regis in West Sussex. It is owned and managed by Arun District Council.

The Brooks has extensive grassland, reedbeds, ponds and newly planted woodland. One area has been turned into a dog-free wildlife sanctuary for ground-nesting birds. The site is flooded every winter, which makes it a good habitat for wetland flora and fauna.

The site is open to the public.
