= Brandy Hole Copse =

UK nature reserve

Coordinates: 50.852°N 0.791°W

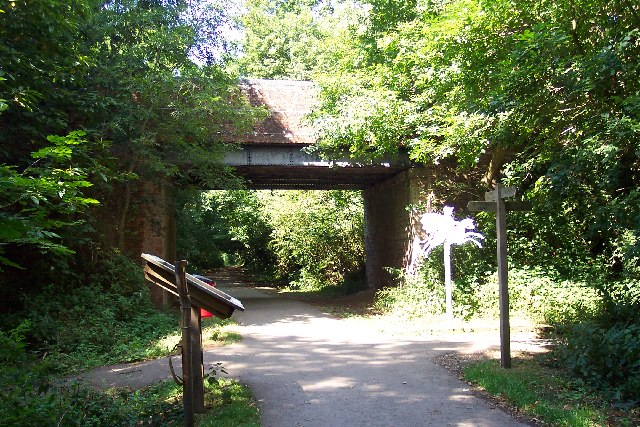
- Interactive map of Brandy Hole Copse
- Type: Local Nature Reserve
- Location: Chichester, West Sussex
- OS grid: SU 852 065
- Area: 6.5 hectares (16 acres)
- Manager: Chichester District Council

Brandy Hole Copse is a 6.5-hectare (16-acre) Local Nature Reserve on the western outskirts of Chichester in West Sussex. It is owned and managed by Chichester District Council. Part of it is a Scheduled Monument, Chichester Dyke.

This site has broadleaved and coniferous woodland, open water, marshland, heath, tall fern and herbs. Fauna includes pipistrelle bats.

There is access from Brandy Hole Lane and the Centurion Way runs through the site.
