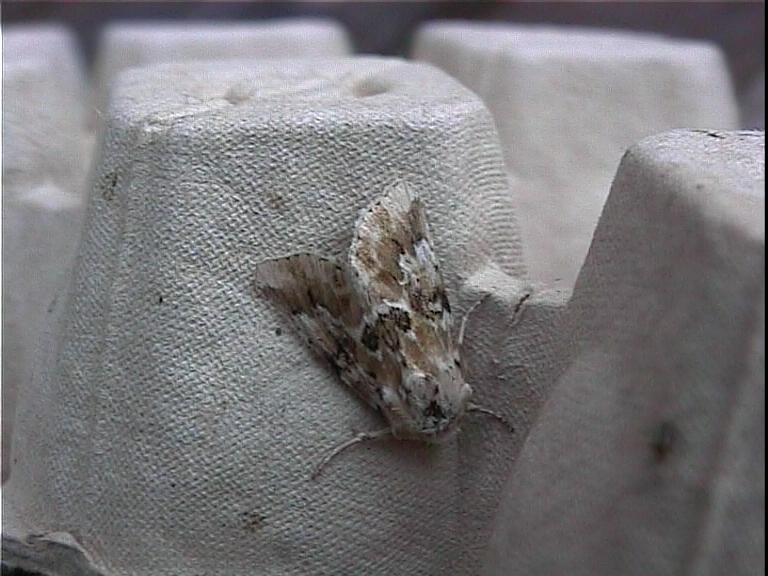

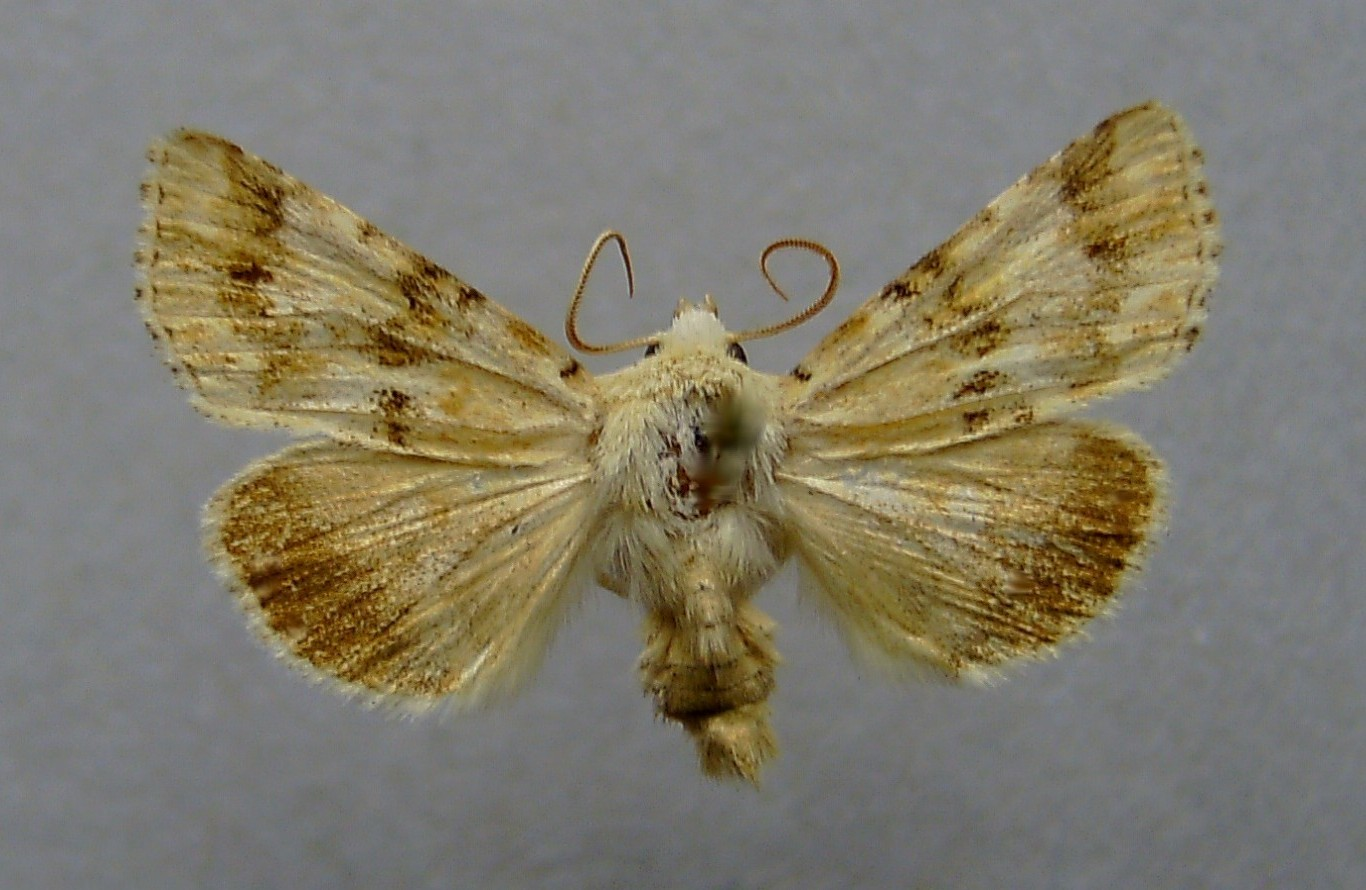

Scientific classification
- Domain: Eukaryota
- Kingdom: Animalia
- Phylum: Arthropoda
- Class: Insecta
- Order: Lepidoptera
- Superfamily: Noctuoidea
- Family: Noctuidae
- Genus: Eremobia
- Species: E. ochroleuca

Binomial name
- Eremobia ochroleuca (Denis & Schiffermüller, 1775)

= Eremobia ochroleuca =

Species of moth

Eremobia ochroleuca, the dusky sallow, is a moth of the family Noctuidae. It is found in Central and Southern Europe and the Middle East.

== Technical description and variation ==
E. ochroleuca Esp. (41b). Forewing white, suffused with pale olive brown; lines broadly white, the inner and outer generally coalescing on submedian fold, the outer line denticulate externally; median area often darker brown, somewhat blackish tinged, especially in the male; orbicular stigma pale olive, the reniform white with an ochreous centre: submarginal line whitish, indented on each fold and there preceded by some dark brown scaling; a row of dark marginal lunules; fringe ochreous with two outer rows of dark lunules; hindwing ochreous dusted with luteous grey; a dark cell spot and outer line followed by a pale space before the broad fuscous marginal border; fringe white. — Larva pale green; lines whitish; lateral line broadly white, its lower edge blackish; spiracles black: head pale brown; the tubercles blackish. The wingspan is 34–37 mm.

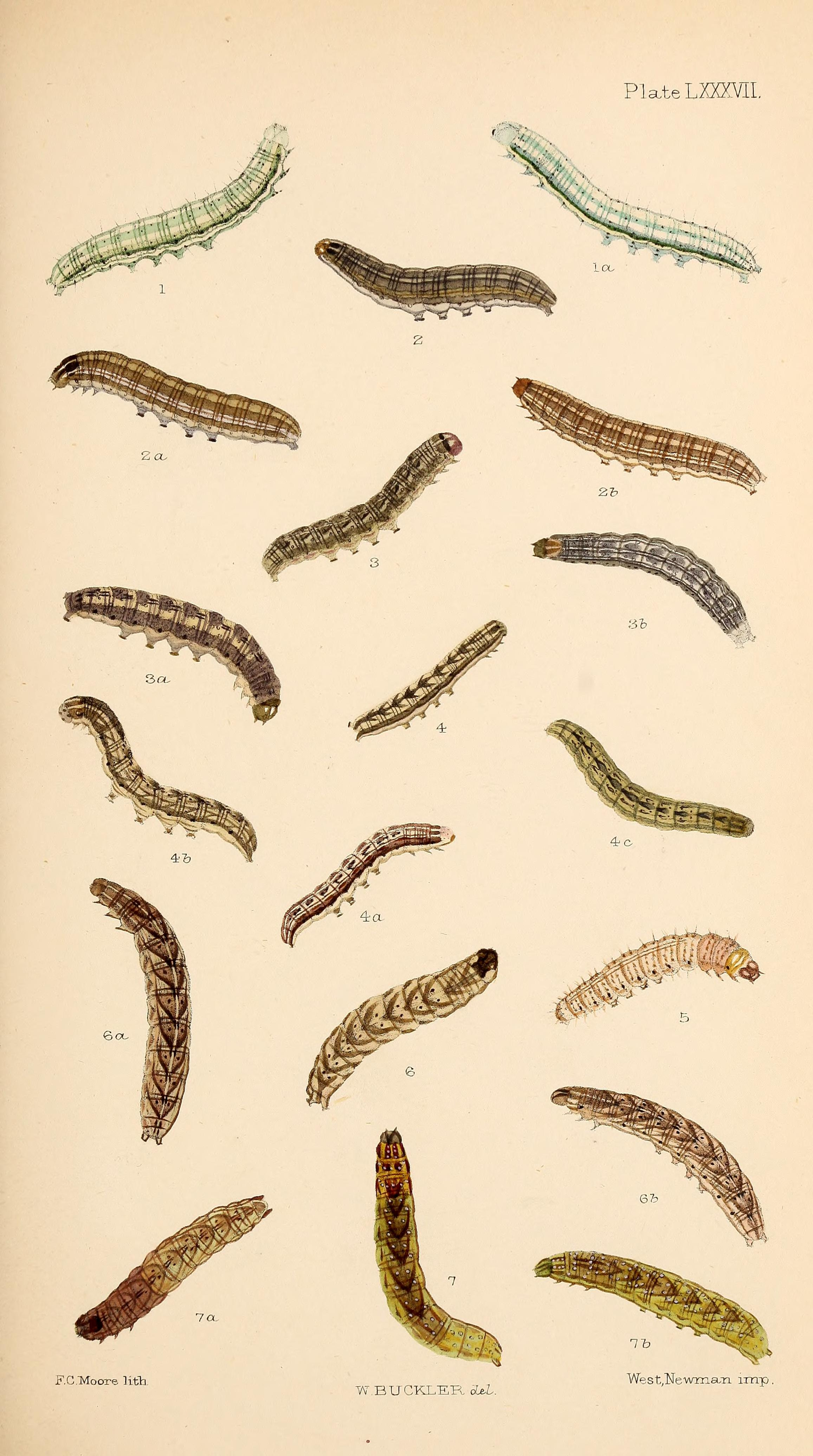
1, 1a larvae after final moult

== Biology ==
The larvae feed on various grasses, primarily Dactylis glomerata. first on the leaves, later devouring the seeds.
