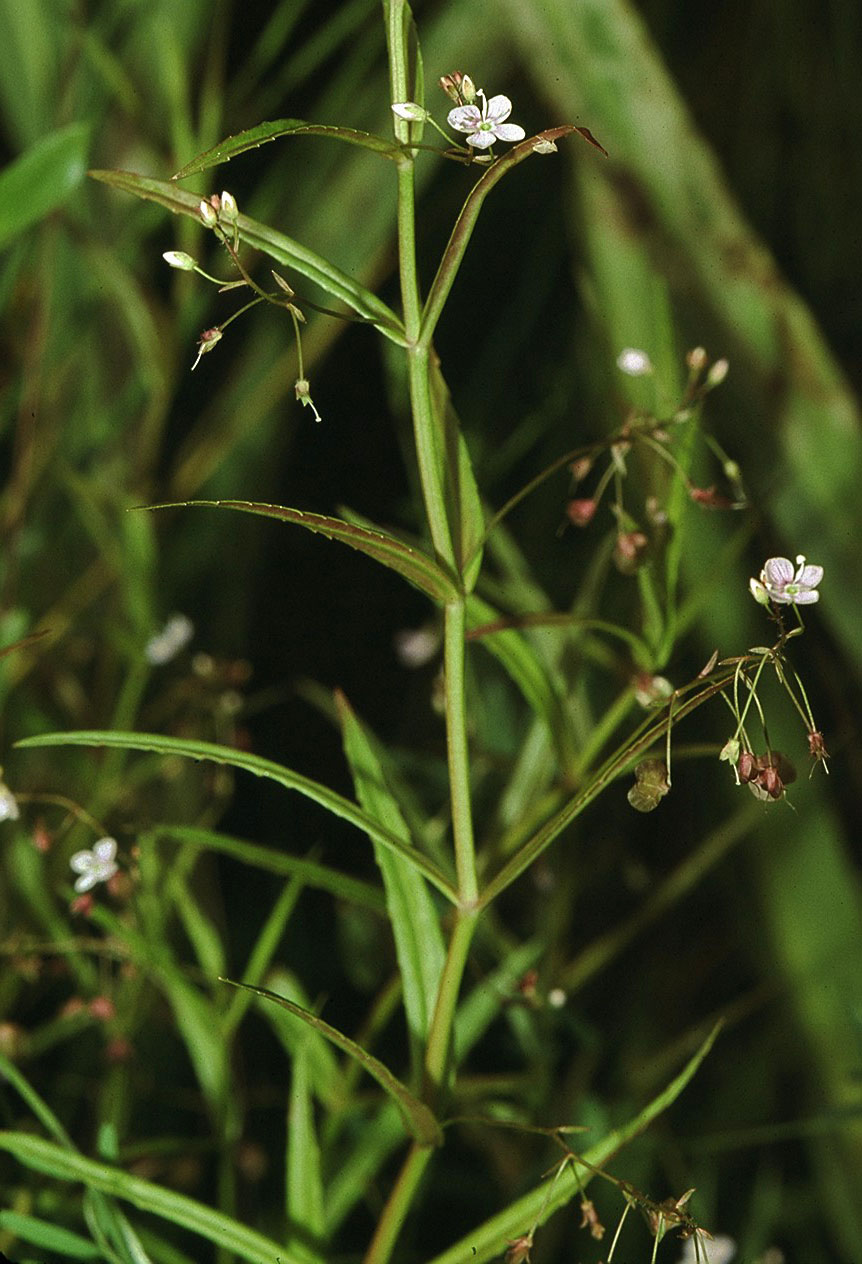

Scientific classification
- Kingdom: Plantae
- Clade: Tracheophytes
- Clade: Angiosperms
- Clade: Eudicots
- Clade: Asterids
- Order: Lamiales
- Family: Plantaginaceae
- Genus: Veronica
- Species: V. scutellata

Binomial name
- Veronica scutellata L.

Synonyms
- List: Cardia scutellata; Limnaspidium parmularium; Limnaspidium scutellatum; Veronica angustifolia; Veronica angustifolia var. pubescens; Veronica connata; Veronica connata subsp. typica; Veronica parmularia; Veronica polozhiae; Veronica scutellata f. alba; Veronica scutellata var. angustifolia; Veronica scutellata var. glabra; Veronica scutellata var. grandifolia; Veronica scutellata var. latifolia; Veronica scutellata var. longibracteata; Veronica scutellata var. parmularia; Veronica scutellata var. pilosa; Veronica scutellata var. pubescens; Veronica scutellata var. velutina; Veronica scutellata var. villosa; Veronica scutellata var. villosa; Veronica scutellata f. villosa; Veronica uliginosa

= Veronica scutellata =

Plant species in the veronica family

Veronica scutellata is a species of flowering plant in the plantain family known by the common names marsh speedwell, skullcap speedwell, and grassleaf speedwell. It is native to temperate Asia, Europe, northern Africa, and northern North America in a variety of wet habitats.

== Description ==
It is a herbaceous (non-woody) perennial speedwell that produces a creeping stem that roots at its nodes then ascends to flower, to 60 cm (24 in) in length, using other vegetation as a scaffold. The paired leaves alternate in direction and are very narrow and pointed, stalkless, somewhat rigid, often with a yellowed or reddened hue, with obscure teeth (or none), and curling under at the edges; it initially rises with its leaves vertical to push through vegetation and later opens them sideways to anchor its position. The alternating floral spikes emerge from the stem with the base of the leaf stalks, each a sparse array of several flowers, the flowers themselves on long thin stalks. The flowers are small (3–7 mm (0.12–0.28 in) diam), pale lilac, pale blue or whitish, although sometimes strongly coloured, with accentuated veins, which at maturity form flat capsules 3–5 mm long, deeply divided at the top. Although typically lacking in much hair (var. scutella), some forms are densely hairy usually with a mixture of glandular and non-glandular hairs, especially in drier habitats (var. villosa).

== Taxonomy ==
Veronica scutellata was given its scientific name in 1753 by Carl Linnaeus. It is part of the genus Veronica, which is classified in the Plantaginaceae family. The species has no accepted varieties, but 11 have been described that are among its 23 synonyms including 8 species.

Table of Species Synonyms
Name	Year	Notes
Cardia scutellata (L.) Dulac	1867	≡ hom.
Limnaspidium parmularium Fourr.	1869	= het.
Limnaspidium scutellatum Fourr.	1869	= het.
Veronica angustifolia Gray	1821	≡ hom., nom. illeg.
Veronica connata Raf.	1830	= het.
Veronica parmularia Poit. & Turpin	1809	= het.
Veronica polozhiae Revuschkin	1990	= het., contrary to Art. 37.5 ICBN (1988)
Veronica uliginosa Raf.	1818	= het.
Notes: ≡ homotypic synonym; = heterotypic synonym

== Distribution and habitat ==
It is native to Europe (but rare near the Mediterranean), North Asia, Most of North America and Algeria, and is not indicated as introduced to any country.

Its habitat is marshes, shores, water banks and a wide range of other wet places, particularly acidic. In America its altitude range is 0–1800(2400) m, in Turkey it is found along the north at 0–500 m.
