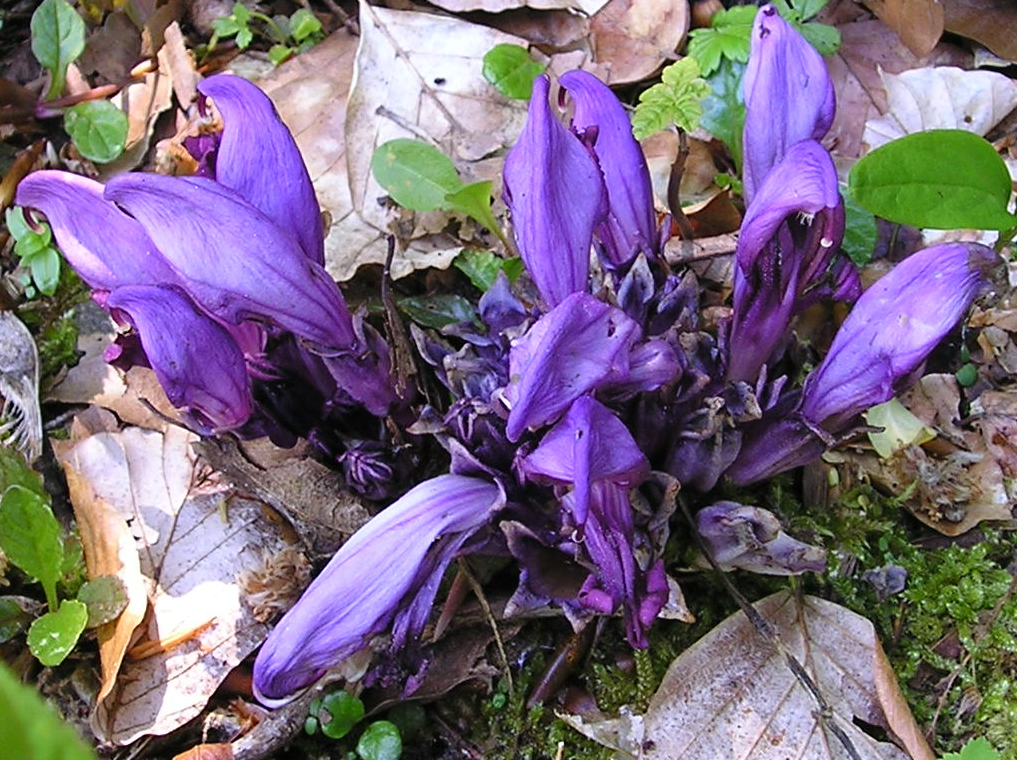
- Close-up of flowers

Scientific classification
- Kingdom: Plantae
- Clade: Tracheophytes
- Clade: Angiosperms
- Clade: Eudicots
- Clade: Asterids
- Order: Lamiales
- Family: Orobanchaceae
- Genus: Lathraea
- Species: L. clandestina

Binomial name
- Lathraea clandestina L. (1753)

Synonyms
- Clandestina clandestina (L.) Huth [Invalid] Clandestina penduliflora Lam. Clandestina purpurea Hill

= Lathraea clandestina =

Species of flowering plant in the broomrape family

Lathraea clandestina, the purple toothwort also known as clandestine in France, is a parasitic plant species in the flowering plant family Orobanchaceae. It is native to western Europe.

== Description ==
Lathraea clandestina is a holoparasite that has neither leaves nor chlorophyll and draws its food from the roots of its hosts via suckers known as haustoria. The subterranean part, which can weigh several kilograms, consists of white stems covered with fleshy scales. The flowers are 40 to 50 mm, with long pedicels; they appear near to the ground in April−May. The normal colour of the flowers is purple or purplish-violet, but rarely colonies with paler, pink or even wholly white flowers may be encountered.

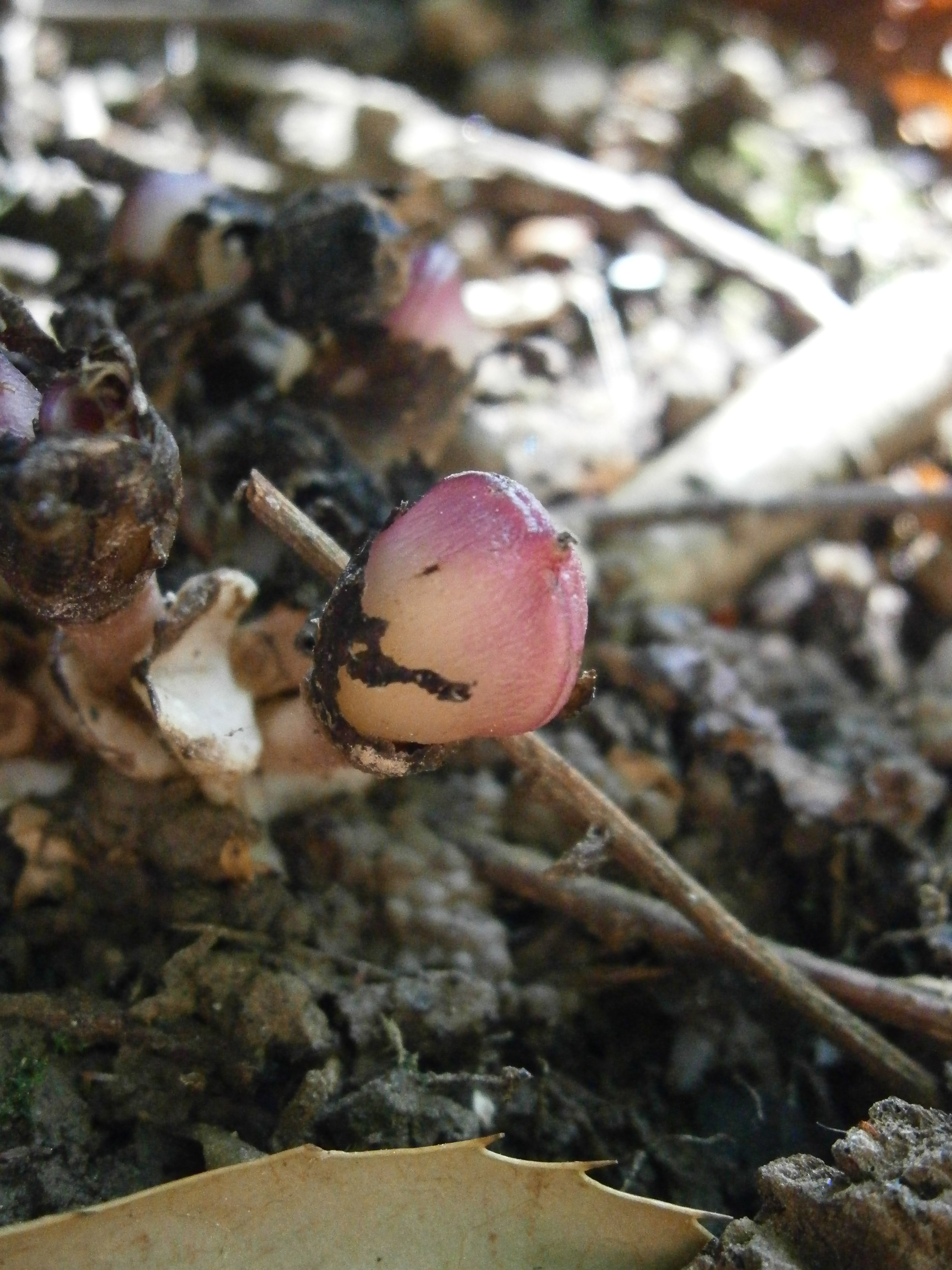
Fruit of Lathraea clandestina

Mature fruits can project their 4 to 5 large seeds some distance into the surrounding area. The plant then disappears from the surface until the following spring. Seedlings grown from seed will take about ten years to produce their first flowers. The total absence of green indicates the parasitic nature of the species which, free of chlorophyll, attaches to the roots of the host to harvest the nutrients necessary for its growth. Given that it flowers and produces fruits during the rise of the sap in the spring, the hosts appear to suffer very little from this parasitism.

== Distribution ==
Purple toothwort grows mainly in the West and South of Europe, especially Western and Central France, from Western Belgium, where it is locally abundant in the Flemish Ardennes, as far as Northern Spain, with localised populations in Central Italy. In France, it is found almost exclusively southwest of the Loire river to the Pyrenees, with an extension north of the Loire to the south-east of Brittany and the departments of Mayenne, Orne and Sarthe. It is protected in some departments, but is relatively common in the wetlands of the department of Charente and Charente-Maritime where it is not protected. In Spain, it occurs mainly in the Cantabrian Cordillera: extending to Galicia, where it is rare.

Populations found far from the Franco-Iberian continuous area suggests that they may originally be the result of deliberate or accidental introductions of parasitised trees. The plant can be found elsewhere in France (Alsace), the Netherlands, Italy, Germany and the British Isles, where the plant is locally naturalized in parks and old gardens. At Arduaine Garden in Argyll, in the absence of well-known hosts, it grows on the roots of a variety of ornamental trees and shrubs; in the same garden cats are frequently seen to roll in the flowers and to eat them.

== Habitat ==
Lathraea clandestina grows preferentially in damp woodlands of valley bottoms, usually near streams where it parasitizes the roots of various plants: especially the deciduous trees Populus and Salix (poplars and willows). Purple toothwort also has been recorded as parasitising a wide range of other plants, including: Acer, Alnus, Buxus, Carpinus, Corylus, Juglans, Metasequoia, Quercus, Rhododendron, Taxus and even Gunnera.
