= Church of the Sacred Heart and St Catherine of Alexandria =

Coordinates: 52.258585°N 2.155838°W

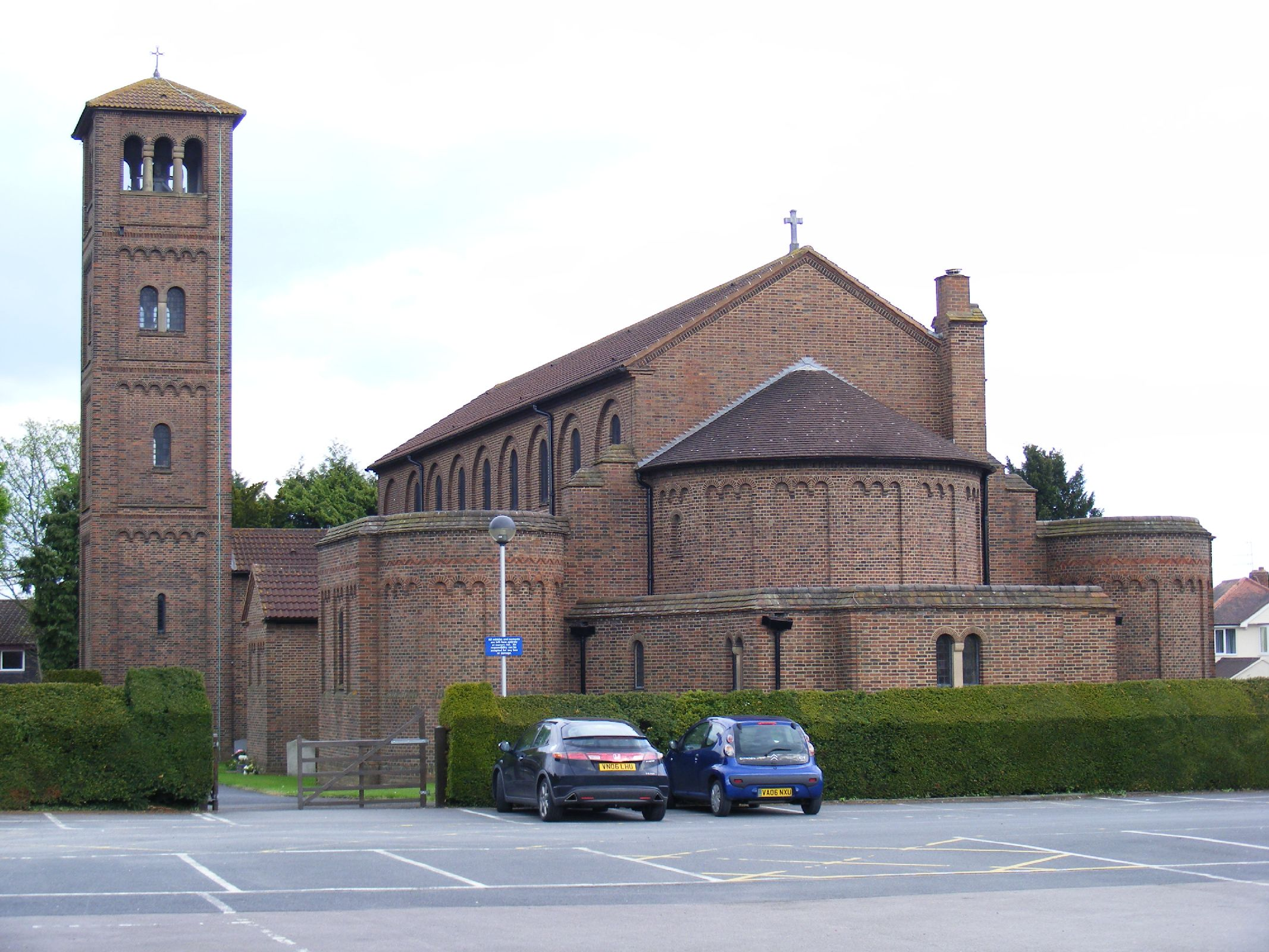
The Catholic church in Droitwich

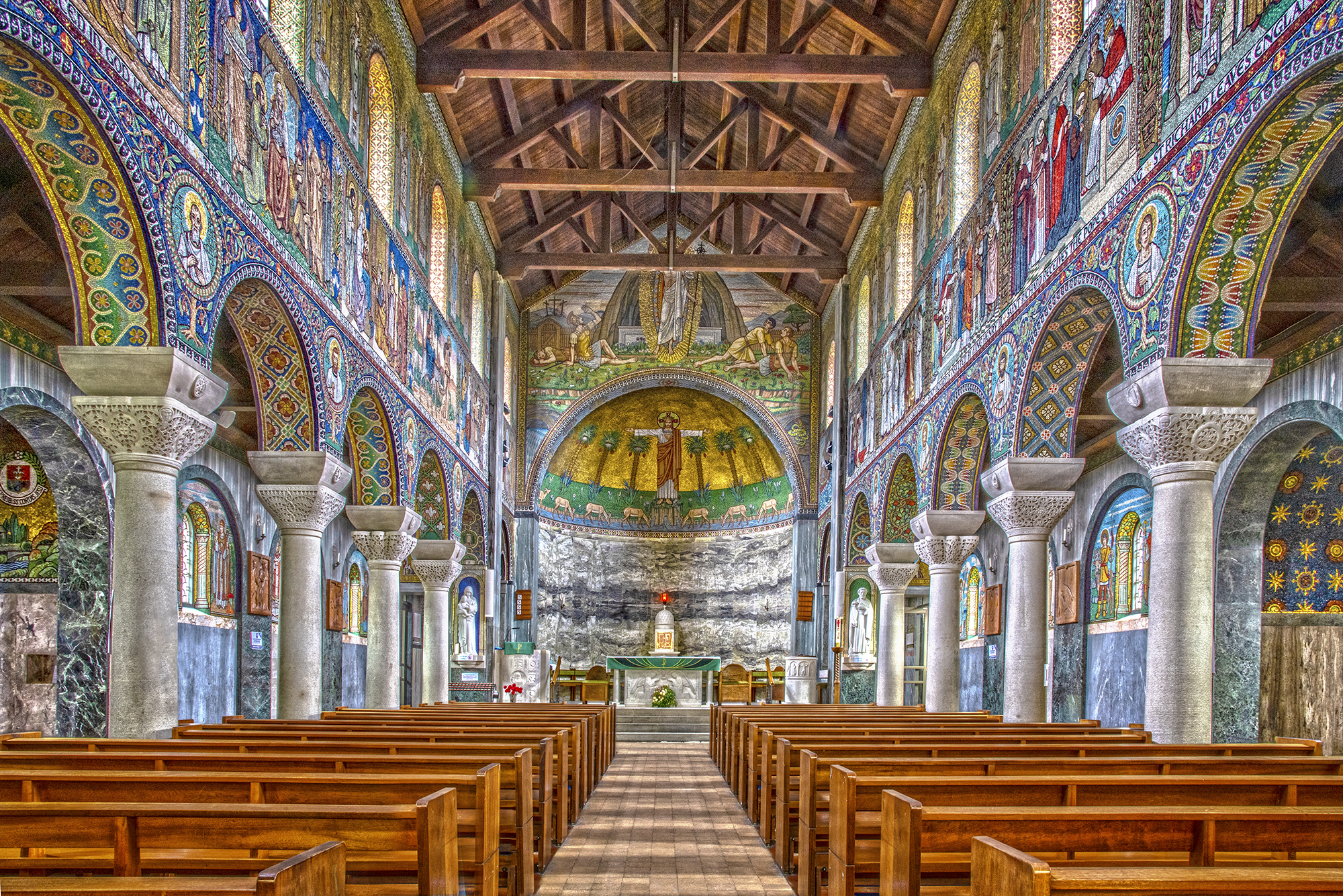
Interior decoration

The Church of the Sacred Heart and St Catherine of Alexandria is a Catholic church situated in Droitwich Spa, Worcestershire, England, noted for its remarkable and extensive mosaics. The church is often referred to as "England's Ravenna" and is heavily influenced by the churches in Ravenna, just south of Venice, Italy. It is considered as one of the most beautiful churches in England.

Walter Loveridge Hodgkinson of Rashwood Court, Droitwich, was the main benefactor of the church. He built the church in memory of his wife Catherine who died in 1906. The architect was Frank Barry Peacock, a partner in the Birmingham architectural practice of Peacock and Bewlay.

Although the project was planned as early as 1909, it was delayed due to WW1. The foundation stone was laid on 25 November 1919, the feast of St. Catherine of Alexandria and the birth date of Catherine Hodgkinson. The first Mass was celebrated on 24 November 1921, the anniversary of the death of Catherine Hodgkinson. One of the two principal side chapels in the Church is dedicated to St. Catherine.

Hubert Howard Galton of Hadzor Hall was also a significant donor having bought the land in 1909 and funded the decoration of the Lady Chapel in memory of his two sons Theodore and Francis who were killed in WW1 and his daughter Lucy.

The building was listed at Grade II* on 11 December 2013.

== Mosaics ==
The mosaics at the Sacred Heart Church were designed by renowned artist Gabriel Pippet (1880–1962) from Solihull and carried out by a highly skilled mosaicist, Maurice Josey, from London, assisted by Fred Oates, a teenager when he started.

The work commenced in 1921 and took twelve years to complete, although some later work was added. Eight and a half tons of quarter-inch glass mosaic tiles, called "tesserae" – coloured pieces of Smalti Venetian glass, were imported from Venice for the purpose. The influence of the mosaic designs by those in Ravenna is very apparent. Indeed, Pippet travelled to Ravenna, Florence and Rome with Hodgkinson and Peacock to study the mosaics before completing the designs on life size 'cartoons'. Pippet's designs were influenced by the Byzantine art of Ravenna and the Arts and Crafts Movement popular in England in the 18th and early 19th centuries.

Josey also visited and studied in Ravenna and made Pippet's designs into the mosaics we see today.

Along one side of the nave, the story of St. Richard de Wyche (also known as St. Richard of Chichester) is depicted and along the other side is the story of the life of the Virgin Mary. Perhaps the most impressive art is a depiction of the 'Nine Choirs of Angels' on the East wall above the choir gallery. There are two small side chapels off the nave, dedicated to St. Richard and St. Michel Garicoits the founder of the Priests of the Sacred Heart of Jesus of Bétharram , the Order that owns the Church.

Today the Church has a very effective lighting system to illuminate the mosaic scenes and amplify their beauty.

The life-size 'cartoons' painted by Pippet were transferred to the walls using some form of tracing. These are regarded as being of national importance. Maurice Josey used the direct method of creating the mosaic scenes by placing individual glass smalti directly into the mortar. He spent over a decade up a ladder creating the art.

Gabriel Pippet was also an accomplished wood and stone carver. Twelve granite pillars in the nave include his intricate carvings on their double capitals. His statues and other stone carvings can be admired, along with the Stations of the Cross, carved from Oak. He died on 28th November 1962, three days after his wife. They are buried together in the graveyard beside the church.

In 2025 the mosaics were cleaned and where necessary restored professionally by The Mosaic Restoration Company after parishioners secured a grant from the National Lottery Heritage Fund. In 2025 the cartoons were transferred from the Church bell tower to Worcestershire Archive and Archaeology Service based at The Hive in Worcester City Centre. These have been cleaned, repaired and digitised with support from the National Lottery Heritage Fund and are now stored in controlled atmospheric conditions. They remain accessible to the public.

In 2026 a very rare Cosmatesque or Cosmati Pavement floor was discovered in the Lady Chapel. Usually found in Rome and Florence this floor is one of a small number outside Italy. In May 2026 the floor underwent professional restoration with support from the National Lottery Heritage Fund.

In March 1930 the Daily Mirror published a piece headlined 'Nine Years Work On Mosaics' and this was followed a few days later by the Berrow's Worcester Journal stating that this church was the only one in the world that would be completely covered by glass mosaics and marble. In 1940, The Daily Sketch published an article headed '20-Year Task Of Two Men And Boy Is Ended'. On 13 January 2026 BBC Midlands Today broadcast a report on the church and the mosaic restoration.

The church is visited by thousands of people from around the world each year and regarded as an outstanding example of mosaic art and Romanesque architecture.

It is open to visitors every day and is free to enter.
