= Richard of Chichester =

13th-century Bishop of Chichester and saint

Saint Richard of Chichester
- Bishop of Chichester
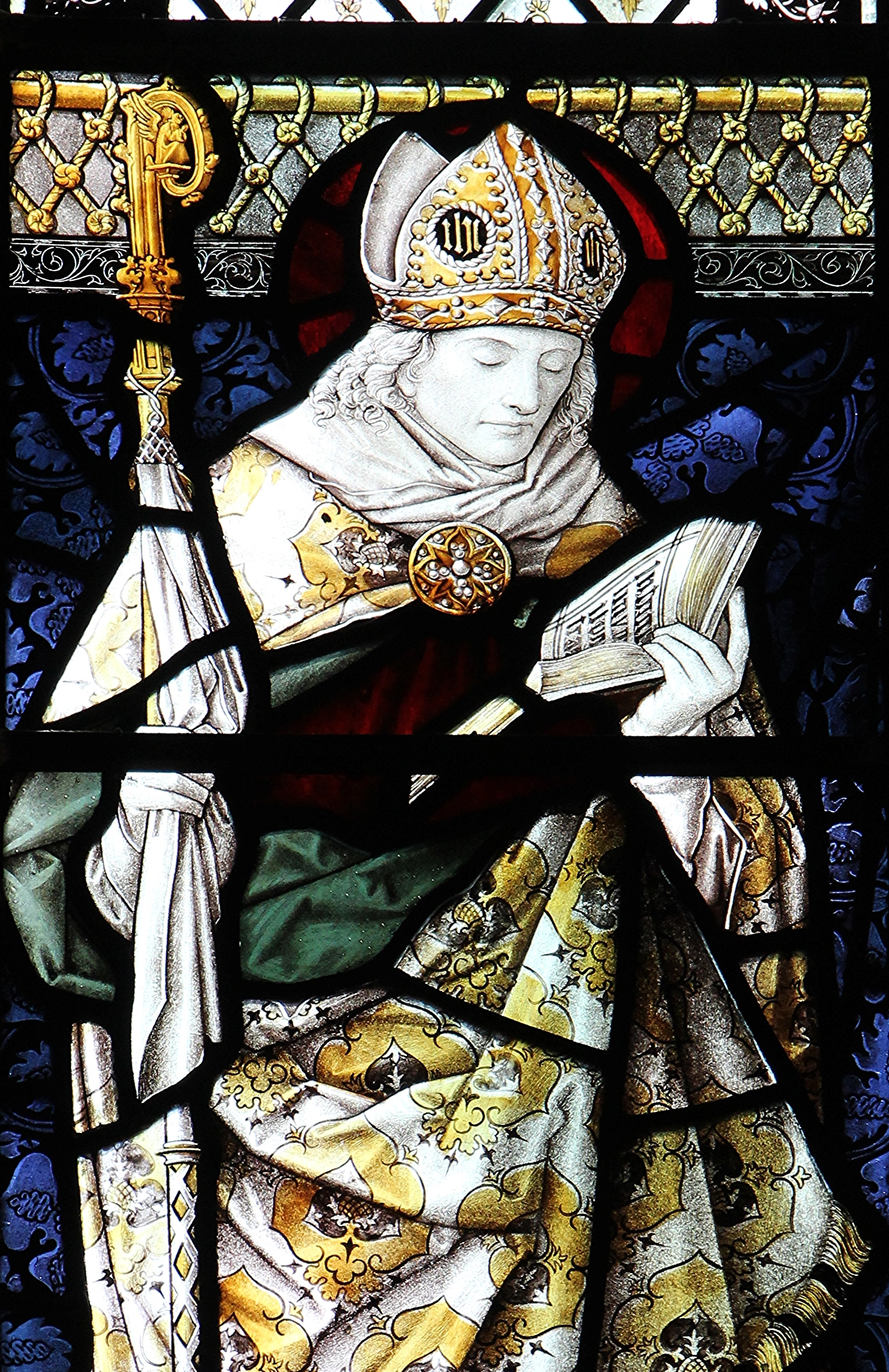
- Stained glass image of St. Richard of Chichester at Church of St Saviour and St Peter, Eastbourne
- Installed: 1244
- Term ended: 1253
- Predecessor: Robert Passelewe
- Successor: John Climping
- Other post: Vicar of Deal

Orders
- Consecration: 5 March 1245 by Pope Innocent IV

Personal details
- Born: Richard c. 1197 Droitwich, Worcestershire, England
- Died: 3 April 1253 Dover, Kent, England
- Denomination: The Western Church

Sainthood
- Feast day: 3 April (Some provinces of the Anglican Communion), 16 June (Roman Catholic Church and in some provinces of the Anglican Communion)
- Venerated in: Catholic Church; Anglican Communion
- Title as Saint: Bishop and Confessor
- Canonized: 25 January 1262; Viterbo, Lazio, Papal States by Pope Urban IV
- Attributes: Bishop with a chalice on its side at his feet because he once dropped the chalice during a Mass and nothing spilled from it; kneeling with the chalice before him; ploughing his brother's fields; a bishop blessing his flock with a chalice nearby
- Patronage: Coachmen; Diocese of Chichester; Sussex, England
- Shrines: Chichester Cathedral

Richard of Chichester (c. 1197 – 3 April 1253), also known as Richard de Wych, is a saint (canonized 1262) of the Catholic and Anglican churches who was the Christian Bishop of Chichester from 1244 to 1253.

In Chichester Cathedral a shrine dedicated to Richard had become a richly decorated centre of pilgrimage. In 1538, during the reign of Henry VIII, the shrine was plundered and destroyed by order of Thomas Cromwell.

Richard of Chichester is the patron saint of Sussex in southern England. The Anglican Church has, since 2007, celebrated his translated saint's day on 16 June, Sussex Day.

== Life ==
Richard was born in the Burford area, near the town of Wyche (modern Droitwich, Worcestershire) and was an orphan member of a gentry family. On the death of their parents, Richard's elder brother was heir to the estates but he was not old enough to inherit, so the lands became subject to a feudal wardship. On coming of age, his brother took possession of his lands, but was required to pay a medieval form of death duty that left the family so impoverished that Richard had to work for him on the farm. His brother also made Richard heir to the estate. According to Richard's biographers, friends tried to arrange a match with a certain noble lady. However, Richard rejected the proposed match, suggesting that his brother might marry her instead; he also reconveyed his rights in the family estates back to his brother, preferring a life of study and the Church.

Educated at the University of Oxford, Richard soon began to teach in that university. From there he proceeded to Paris and then Bologna, where he distinguished himself by his proficiency in canon law. On returning to England in 1235, in his late thirties, Richard was elected Oxford's chancellor.

His former tutor, Edmund of Abingdon, had become by that time archbishop of Canterbury. Richard shared Edmund's ideals of clerical reform and supported papal rights even against the king. In 1237, Archbishop Edmund appointed Richard chancellor of the diocese of Canterbury. Richard joined the archbishop during his exile at Pontigny, and was with him when the archbishop died around 1240. Richard then decided to become a priest, and studied theology for two years with the Dominicans at Orléans. Upon returning again to England, Richard became the parish priest at Charing and at Deal, but soon was reappointed chancellor of Canterbury by the new archbishop Boniface of Savoy.

In 1244, Richard was elected as Bishop of Chichester. Henry III and part of the chapter refused to accept him, the king favouring the candidature of Robert Passelewe (d. 1252). Archbishop Boniface refused to confirm Passelew, so both sides appealed to the pope. The king confiscated the see's properties and revenues, but Innocent IV confirmed Richard's election and consecrated him bishop at Lyons in March 1245. Richard then returned to Chichester, but the king refused to restore the see's properties for two years, and then did so only after being threatened with excommunication. Henry III forbade anyone to house or feed Richard. At first, Richard lived at Tarring in the house of his friend Simon, the parish priest of Tarring, visited his entire diocese on foot, and cultivated figs in his spare time.

Richard's private life was said to have displayed rigid frugality and temperance. Richard was an ascetic who wore a hair-shirt and refused to eat off silver. He kept his diet simple and rigorously excluded animal flesh, having been a vegetarian since his days at Oxford.

Richard furnished the chronicler, Matthew Paris, with material for the life of St. Edmund Rich, and instituted the offerings for the cathedral at Chichester which were known later as "St. Richard's pence".

Richard was merciless to usurers, corrupt clergy and priests who mumbled the Mass. He was also a stickler for clerical privilege.

Richard's episcopate was marked by the favour which he showed to the Dominicans, a monastery of this order at Orléans having housed him during his stay in France, and by his earnestness in preaching a crusade. After dedicating St Edmund's Chapel at Dover, he died aged 56 at the Maison Dieu, Dover at midnight on 3 April 1253 — the Pope had ordered him to preach a crusade at Dover. His internal organs were removed and placed in the local chapel's altar. Richard's body was then carried to Chichester and buried, according to his wishes, in the chapel on the north side of the nave, dedicated to his patron St. Edmund. His remains were translated to a new shrine in 1276, on June 16, which also serves as his translated saint's day for Anglicans.

== Episcopal statutes ==
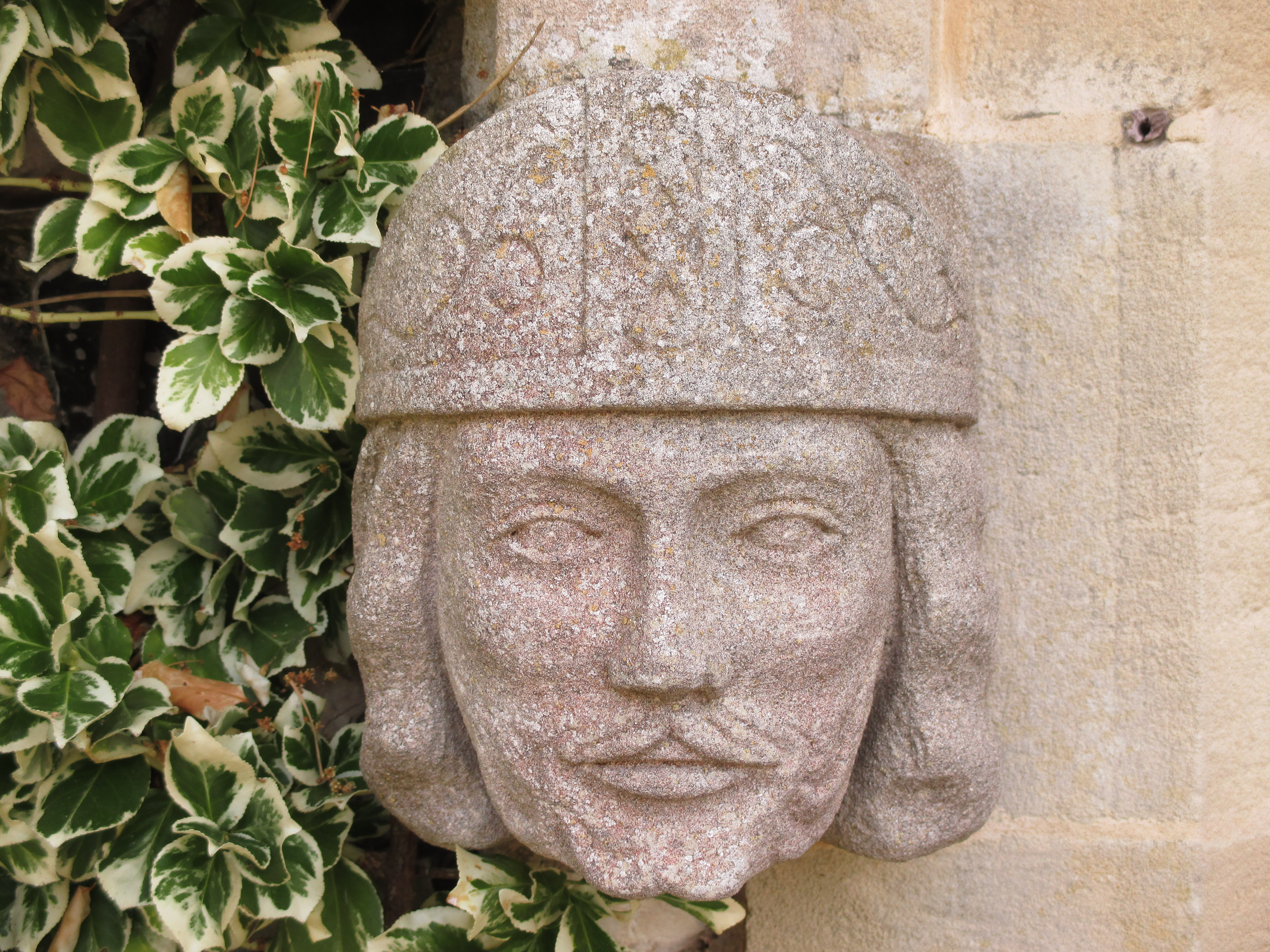
Sculpture of Richard of Chichester outside St Margaret's Church, Rottingdean

After the full rights of the see and its revenues were returned to him in 1246, the new bishop showed much eagerness to reform the manners and morals of his clergy, and also to introduce greater order and reverence into the services of the Church. Richard overruled Henry on several occasions. Richard defrocked a priest who had seduced a nun out of her convent, turning aside a petition from the king in the priest's favour.

Richard was militant in protecting the clergy from abuse. When townsmen of Lewes violated the right of sanctuary by seizing a criminal in church and lynching him, Richard made them exhume the body and give it a proper burial in consecrated ground. He also imposed severe penance on knights who attacked priests.

Richard produced a body of statutes with the aid of his chapter, for the organisation of the church in his diocese and the expected conduct of its clergy. It seems that many of the clergy still secretly married, though such alliances were not recognised by canon law, and as such their women's status was that of a mistress or concubine. The bishop endeavoured to suppress the practice in his diocese with relentless austerity.

By Richard's statutes [the following is a close paraphrase not an exact quote]:

It was decreed that married clergy should be deprived of their benefices; their concubines were to be denied the privileges of the church during their lives and also after death; they were pronounced incapable of inheriting any property from their husbands, and any such bequests would be donated for the upkeep of the cathedral. A vow of chastity was to be required of candidates for ordination. Rectors were expected to reside in their parishes, to be hospitable and charitable. Tithes were to be paid on all annual crops. Anyone who did not pay their tithe would not be granted penance until they did.

Vicars were to be priests and have only one freehold to live on. They were not allowed to have another parish held under an assumed name.
Deacons were not to be allowed to hear confessions or to provide penances, or to baptise except in the absence of a priest. Children had to be confirmed within a year of baptism. The Apostles' Creed and the Lord's Prayer were to be learned in the mother tongue; priests were to celebrate mass in clean robes, to use a silver or golden chalice; thoroughly clean corporals and at least two consecrated palls were to be placed on the altar; the cross was to be planted in front of the celebrant; the bread was to be of the purest wheaten flour, the wine mixed with water. The elements were not to be kept more than seven days; when carried to a sick person to be enclosed in a pyx, and the priest to be preceded by a cross; a candle, holy water and bell.
Practices such as gambling at baptisms and marriages was strictly forbidden.
Archdeacons were to administer justice for their proper fees, not demanding more for either rushing or delaying the business. They were to visit the churches regularly, to see that the services were duly ministered, the vessels and vestments were in proper order, the canon of the mass correctly observed and distinctly read, as also the hours. Priests who clipped or slurred the words by rushing were to be suspended.
The clergy should wear their proper dress and not imitate what lay people wore. They were not allowed to wear their hair long or have romantic entanglements. The names of excommunicated persons to be read out four times a year in the parish churches.

A copy of these statutes was to be kept by every priest in the diocese and be brought by him to the episcopal synod.

== Shrine ==
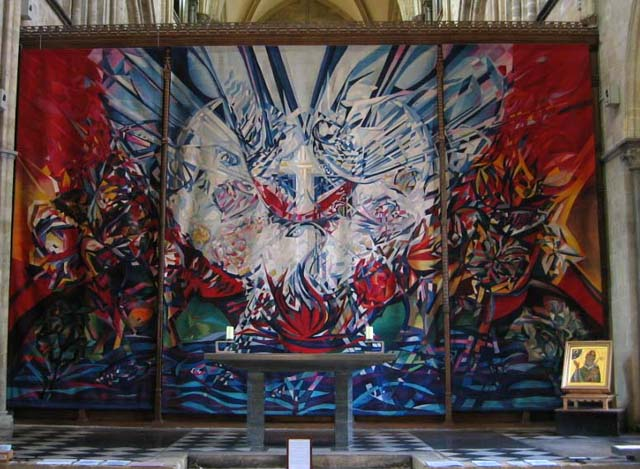
The modern day site of the shrine of St Richard in Chichester Cathedral.

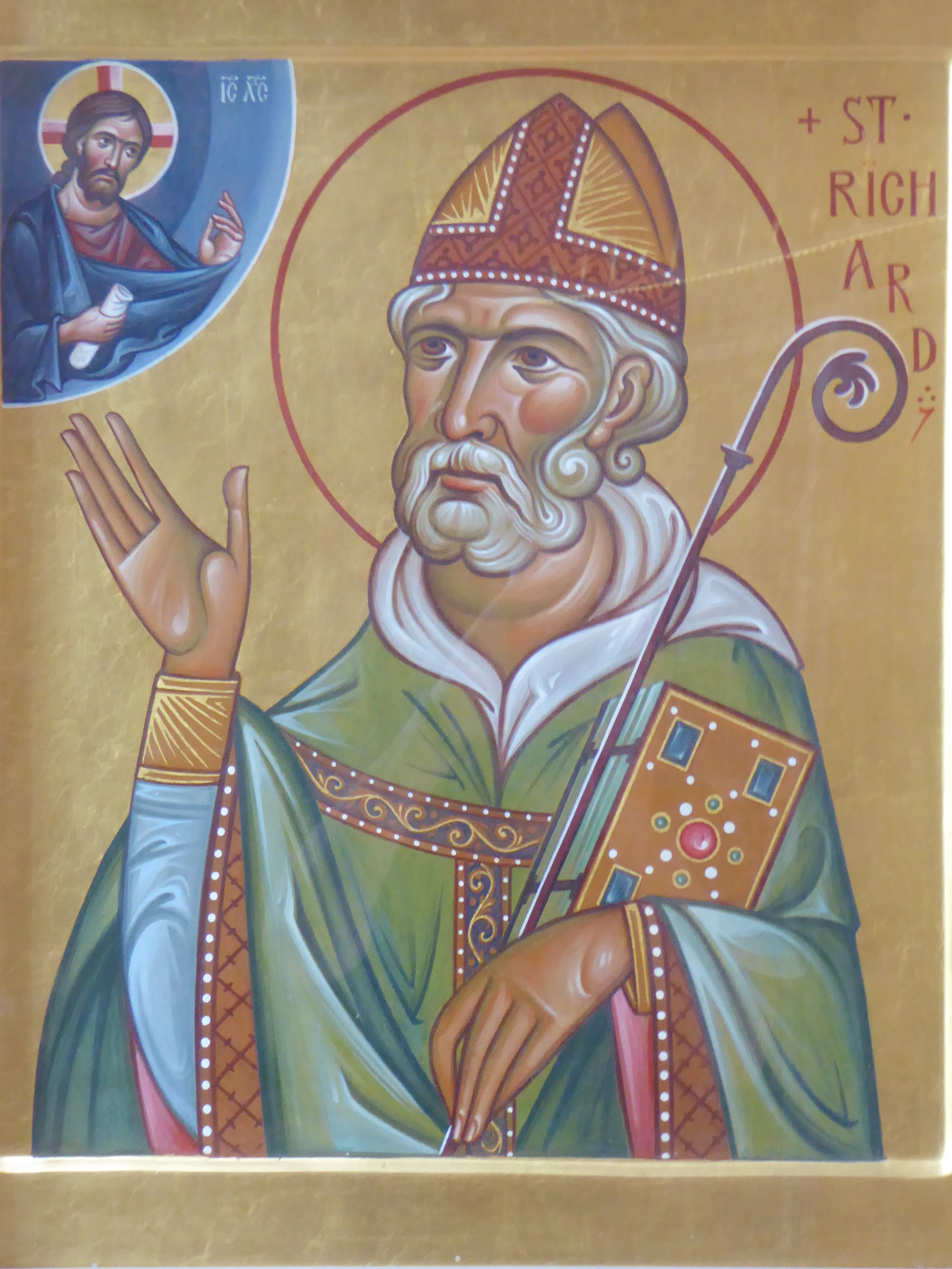
Icon of St Richard in Chichester Cathedral

It was generally believed that miracles were wrought at Richard's tomb in Chichester Cathedral, which was long a popular place of pilgrimage, and in 1262, just 9 years after his death, he was canonized at Viterbo by Pope Urban IV.

Richard's feast day is on 3 April in the West, but because this date generally falls within Lent or Eastertide this is normally translated to 16 June in some provinces of the Anglican Communion, which venerates St. Richard more widely than does the Roman Catholic Church. Richard is remembered in the Church of England with a Lesser Festival on 16 June.

The first Anglican bishop of Chichester was Richard Sampson, during the reign of King Henry VIII of England. Through his Vicar-General, Thomas Cromwell, the king ordered the destruction of Richard's shrine in Chichester cathedral in 1538.

Forasmuch as we have lately been informed that in our cathedral church of Chichester there hath been used long heretofore, and yet at this day is used, much superstition and a certain kind of idolatry about the shrine and bones of a certain bishop of the same, whom they call Saint Richard, and a certain resort there of common people, which being men of simplicity are seduced by the instigation of some of the clergy, who take advantage of their credulity to ascribe miracles of healing and other virtues to the said bones, that God only hath authority to grant. . . . . We have appointed you, with all convenient diligence to repair unto the said cathedral church, and to take away the shrine and bones of that bishop called Saint Richard, with all ornaments to the said shrine belonging, and all other the reliques and reliquaries, the silver, the gold, and all the jewels belonging to said shrine, and that not only shall you see them to be safely and surely conveyed unto our Tower of London there to be bestowed and placed at your arrival, but also ye shall see both the place where the shrine was kept, destroyed even to the ground and all such other images of the said church, where about any notable superstition is used, to be carried and conveyed away, so that our subjects shall by them in no ways be deceived hereafter, but that they pay to Almighty God and to no earthly creature such honour as is due unto him the Creator. . . . . Given under our privy seal at our manor of Hampton Court, the 14th day of Dec., in the 30th year of our reign (1538).
Document issued by Thomas Cromwell on behalf of Henry VIII.

The Shrine of St. Richard had, up to this point, enjoyed a level of popularity approaching that accorded to Thomas Becket at Canterbury. The document ordering the destruction of the shrine was issued to a Sir William Goring of Burton and a William Ernley. They received £40 for carrying out the commission on 20 December 1538.

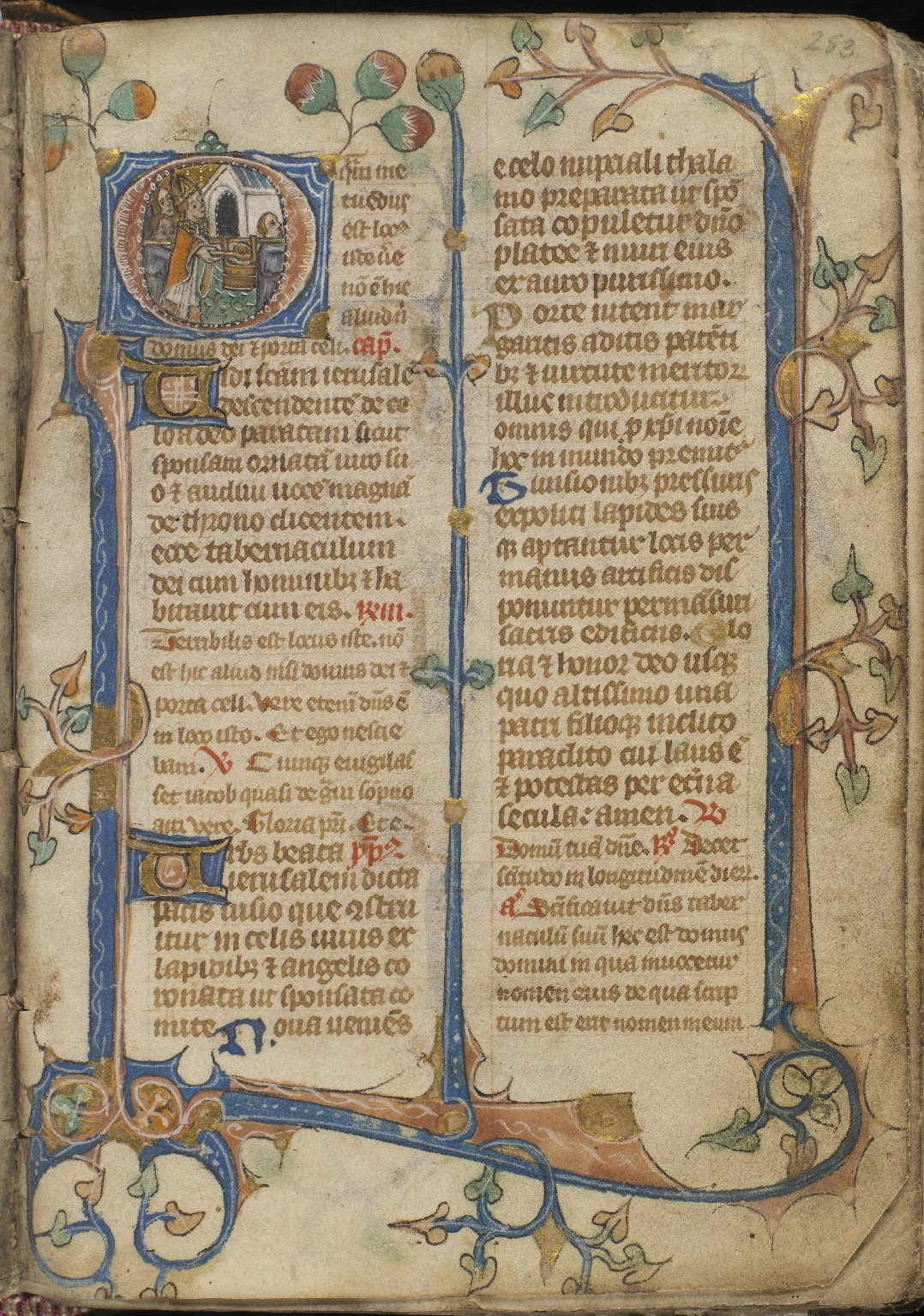
A breviary in Latin probably written for use in the neighborhood of Chichester. The Sarum Breviary contains a translation from St Richard of Chichester present at f.380v.

One of the royal commissioners for the destruction of St. Richard's Shrine, William Ernley, was associated with the parish of West Wittering in Sussex. Someone from there, it seems, may have spirited away the relics and bones of St. Richard and hidden them in their own parish church. It is here that local tradition holds remains of the saint are to be found:

The Lady Chapel not only contains the Saxon Cross but also an ancient broken marble slab engraved with a Bishop's pastoral staff and a Greek cross believed to have come from a reliquary containing the relics of St. Richard of Chichester, a 13th century bishop who often visited West Wittering. Part of his story is shown in the beautiful red, white and gold altar frontal presented by Yvonne Rusbridge in 1976. On the left St Richard is shown feeding the hungry in Cakeham and on the right leading his followers from the church, his candle miraculously alight despite the gust of wind which blew out all the other candles.
Extract from the description of the parish church of St Peter and St Paul, West Wittering.

The modern St Richard's Shrine is located in the retro-quire of Chichester cathedral and was re-established in 1930 by Dean Duncan Jones. In 1987 during the restoration of the Abbey of La Lucerne, in Normandy, the lower part of a man's arm was discovered in a reliquary. The relic was thought to be Richard's. After examination, to establish its provenance, the relic was offered to Bishop Eric Kemp and received into the cathedral on 15 June 1990. The relic was buried in 1991 below the St Richard altar. A further relic, together with an authentication certificate, was offered from Rome at the same time and is now housed at the bishop's chapel in Chichester. The modern shrine of Richard contains an altar that was designed by Robert Potter, a tapestry designed by Ursula Benker-Schirmer (partly woven in her studio in Bavaria and partly at the West Dean College) and an icon designed by Sergei Fyodorov that shows St Richard in episcopal vestments, his hand raised in blessing towards the viewer, but also in supplication to the figure of Christ who appears to him from heaven.

== Prayer ==
Richard is widely remembered today for the popular prayer ascribed to him:

Thanks be to Thee, my Lord Jesus Christ

For all the benefits Thou hast given me,
For all the pains and insults Thou hast borne for me.
O most merciful Redeemer, friend and brother,
May I know Thee more clearly,
Love Thee more dearly,
Follow Thee more nearly.

Richard is supposed to have recited the prayer on his deathbed, surrounded by the clergy of the diocese. The words were transcribed, in Latin, by his confessor Ralph Bocking, a Dominican friar, and were eventually published in the Acta Sanctorum, an encyclopedic text in 68 folio volumes of documents examining the lives of Christian saints. The British Library copy, contains what is believed to be Bocking's transcription of the prayer:

Gratias tibi ago, Domine Jesu Christe, de omnibus beneficiis quae mihi praestitisti;
pro poenis et opprobriis, quae pro me pertulisti;
propter quae planctus ille lamentabilis vere tibi competebat.
Non est dolor similis sicut dolor meus.

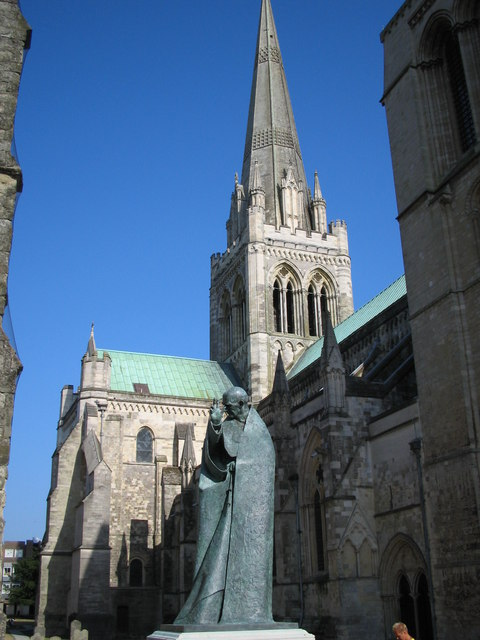
The statue of St Richard near the west door of Chichester Cathedral.

Whoever translated the Latin into English was obviously skilled in his craft as he managed to produce a rhyming triplet, namely "clearly, dearly, nearly". However, versions of St Richard's prayer, before the 20th century, did not contain the triplet and it is thought that the first version that did was published in "The Churchmans Prayer Manual" by G.R.Bullock-Webster in 1913. The rhyming triplet appears in 1895 with words very similar to the version in The Songs of Praise below; the author of the lines is said to be unknown. The first use of the triplet in a hymn was in the "Mirfield Mission Hymnbook" of 1922, and the first use of the phrase "Day by Day" was in the "Songs of Praise, Enlarged Edition" published in 1931.

The author who is credited with translating the prayer from the original Acta Sanctorum and bringing it to public notice, was Cecil Headlam in 1898. The following version in the "Prayers of Saints" is quite different from the one that is familiar today :

THE DYING PRAYER OF S. RICHARD,
Bishop of Chichester.
LORD JESU CHRIST, I thank Thee for
all the blessings Thou hast given me,
and for all the sufferings and shame Thou
didst endure for me, on which account that
pitiable cry of sorrow was Thine : " Behold and
see, if there was any sorrow like unto My
sorrow ! " Thou knowest, Lord, how willing
I should be to bear insult, and pain, and death
for Thee; therefore have mercy on me, for to
Thee do I commend my spirit. Amen

The prayer was adapted for the song "Day by Day" in the musical Godspell (1971), with music by Stephen Schwartz. The words used, with a few embellishments, were based on the following from "Songs of Praise, Enlarged Edition":

Day by day,
Dear Lord, of thee three things I pray:
To see thee more clearly,
Love thee more dearly,
Follow thee more nearly,
Day by Day.

A portion of the prayer has been incorporated into the liturgy of the Roman Catholic Church for use by the personal ordinariates established to bring the Anglican patrimony into the Church. Observance of the memorial of Saint Richard of Chichester on 16 June is inscribed in the calendar of Divine Worship: The Missal and the following Collect is provided:

MOST merciful Redeemer,
who gavest to thy Bishop Richard a love of learning,
a zeal for souls, and a devotion to the poor:
grant that, encouraged by his example,
and aided by his prayers,
we may know thee more clearly,
love thee more dearly,
and follow thee more nearly,
day by day;
who livest and reignest with the Father
in the unity of the Holy Spirit, ever one God,
world without end. Amen.

== Current patronage, festivals and dedication ==
Flag attributed to Saint Richard, which is flown on Sussex Day

Richard of Chichester is celebrated in the Church of England and most provinces of the Anglican Communion on June 16 each year. As the patron saint of the county of Sussex in England, his translated saint's day, 16 June, is also celebrated more broadly by the county as Sussex Day.

Richard is honoured with a feast day on the liturgical calendar of the Episcopal Church (USA) on 3 April, which is also his feast day in the Roman Catholic Church pursuant to the new Roman Martyrology of 2004.

The Anglican parish church of Peel Hall, Wythenshawe was built in 1969 and dedicated to St Richard of Chichester; the construction incorporated stones from a number of different cathedrals, including Chichester Cathedral.

The Church of the Sacred Heart and St. Catherine of Alexandria in Droitwich Spa, Worcestershire is also known as ‘England’s Ravenna ‘ because its architecture and interior art was influenced by the Italian city. The interior is completely covered by eight tonnes of Venetian glass mosaics above a marble lower level. The wall to the right of the nave tells the story of St. Richard in seven panels, from his baptism in Droitwich Spa to his death in Dover. The Church also has a chapel dedicated to St. Richard.The church art was designed by Gabriel Pippet and created in mosaic form by Maurice Richard Josey . Gabriel Pippet also carved the stonework, including a statue of St. Richard in his chapel. The Church attracts thousands of visitors every year and is considered amongst the most beautiful in England.

The town of Droitwich Spa celebrates St. Richard in its Heritage Centre and has his statue in Vines Park

== See also ==
- List of Catholic saints
- History of Christianity in Sussex
- History of Sussex
- West Sussex

== Notes ==
Catholic Church titles
Preceded by Robert Passelewe	Bishop of Chichester; 1244–1253	Succeeded by John Climping
Academic offices
Preceded by John de Rygater	Chancellor of the University of Oxford; 1240	Succeeded by Ralph de Heyham
