= Cosmati =

Roman artists active in the 12th and 13th centuries

The Cosmati were a Roman family, seven members of which, for four generations, were skilful architects, sculptors and workers in decorative geometric mosaic, mostly for church floors.

Their name is commemorated in the genre of Cosmatesque work, often just called "Cosmati", a technique of opus sectile ("cut work") formed of elaborate inlays of small triangles and rectangles of colored stones and glass mosaics set into stone matrices or encrusted upon stone surfaces. Bands, panels and shaped reserves of intricate mosaic alternate with contrasting bands, guilloches and simple geometric shapes of plain white marble. Pavements and revetments were executed in Cosmatesque technique, columns were inlaid with fillets and bands, and immovable church furnishings like cathedras and ambones were similarly treated. Initial inspiration for the technique was Byzantine, transmitted through Ravenna and Sicily, while some of the minutely-figured tiling patterns are Islamic in origin, transmitted through Sicily.

In addition, members of the Cosmati engaged in commerce in ancient sculptures, some unearthed in the course of excavating for marbles for reuse. More than one ancient Roman sculpture has survived with the name of one of these craftsmen incised in it.

The following are the main known Cosmati:

1. Lorenzo (dated works 1190–1210 but probably active earlier)
2. Jacopo (dated works 1205 and 1210)
3. Cosimo (1210–1235)
4. Luca (1221–1240)
5. Jacopo (1213–1293)
6. Deodato (1225–1303)
7. Giovanni (1231 and 1235)

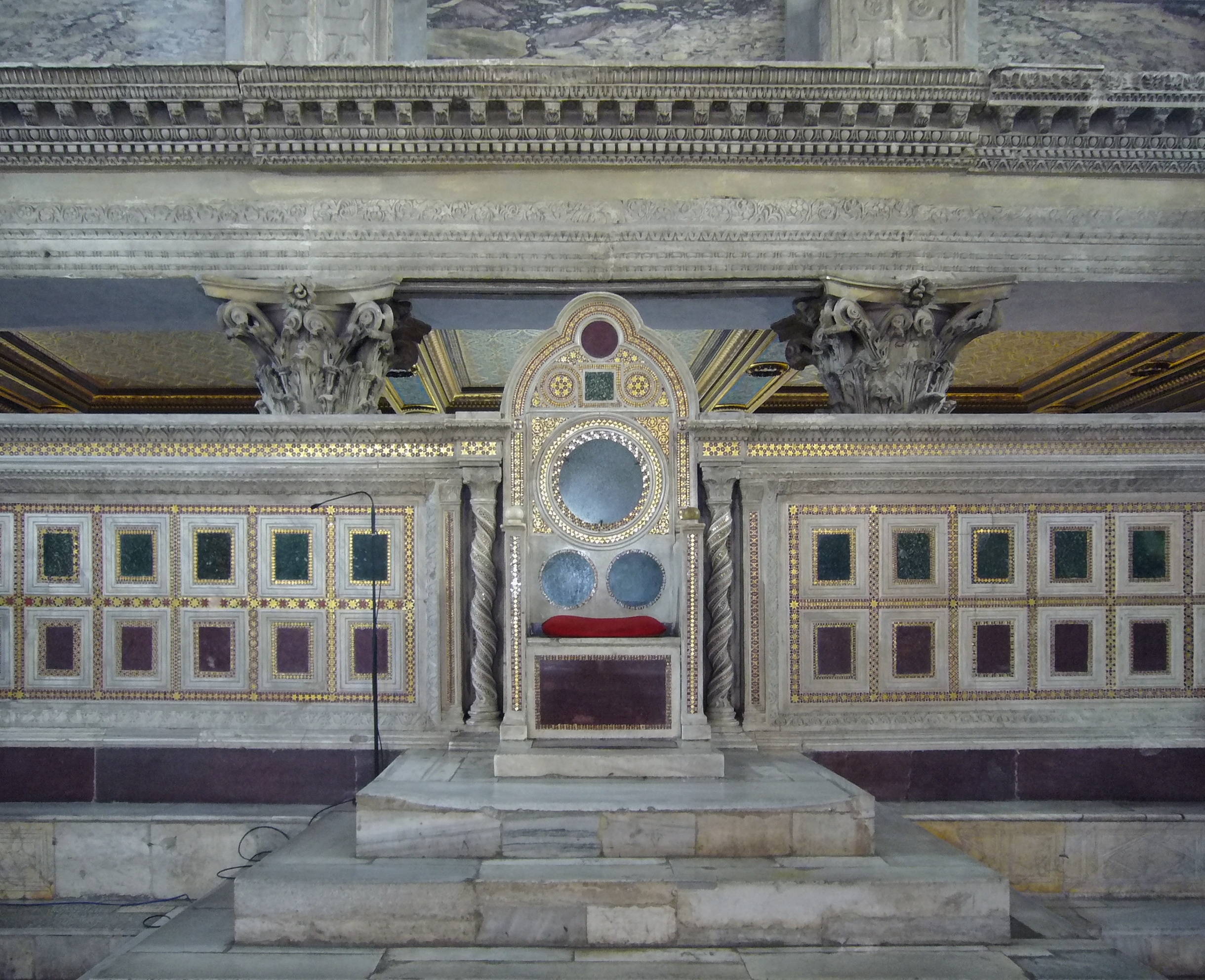
Papal throne and choir-screen in San Lorenzo fuori le Mura, c. 1254

The earliest recorded work was executed for a church at Fabieri in 1190 (Lorenzo) (CE). The principal works of the Cosmati in Rome are:

- ambones of Santa Maria in Aracoeli (Lorenzo)
- door at San Saba, 1205
- door with mosaics at San Tommaso in Formis (Jacopo)
- Chapel of the Sancta Sanctorum by the Lateran (Cosimo)
- pavement of San Giacomo alla Lungara
- the magnificent episcopal throne and choir-screen in San Lorenzo fuori le Mura, of 1254 (probably Jacopo the younger)
- baldacchini of the Lateran and of Santa Maria in Cosmedin, c. 1294 (Deodato)
- tombs in Santa Maria sopra Minerva (c. 1296), in Santa Maria Maggiore, and in Santa Balbina (Giovanni).

The chief signed works by Jacopo the younger and his brother Luca are at Anagni and Subiaco.

A large number of other works by members and pupils of the same family, but unsigned, exist in Rome. These are mainly altars and baldacchini, choir-screens, paschal candlesticks, ambones, tombs and the like, all enriched with sculpture and glass mosaic of great brilliance and decorative effect.

Besides the more mechanical sort of work, such as mosaic patterns and architectural decoration, they also produced mosaic pictures and sculpture of very high merit, especially the recumbent effigies, with angels standing at the head and foot, in the tombs of Aracoeli, S. Maria Maggiore and elsewhere. One of their finest works is in S. Cesareo; this is a marble altar richly decorated with mosaic in sculptured panels, and (below) two angels drawing back a curtain (all in marble) so as to expose the open grating of the confessio. The magnificent cloisters of Basilica of Saint Paul Outside the Walls, built about 1285 by Giovanni, the youngest of the Cosmati, are one of the most beautiful works of this school. The baldacchino of the same basilica is a signed work of the Florentine Arnolfo di Cambio, 1285, cum suo socio Petro, probably a pupil of the Cosmati. Other works of Arnolfo, such as the Braye tomb at Orvieto, show an intimate artistic alliance between him and the Cosmati. The equally magnificent cloisters of the Lateran, of about the same date, are very similar in design; both these triumphs of the sculptor-architects and mosaicists work have slender marble columns, twisted or straight, richly inlaid with bands of glass mosaic in delicate and brilliant patterns. In the crypt at Anagni is the largest section of undisturbed Cosmatesque flooring.

Cosmatesque decoration is not entirely confined to Rome, or even to Italy. At Westminster Abbey there are two Cosmatesque pavements, the finest north of the Alps set in Purbeck Marble: one is the Great Pavement before the high altar, the other the paving and decor associated with the shrine of Edward the Confessor in the Sanctuary, both works executed about 1268 for the connoisseur-king Henry III. They are extremely unusual in England: more characteristic luxury flooring in England consisted of lead-glazed ceramic tiles painted in patterns. This mosaic is depicted in Hans Holbein's The Ambassadors.

A fine example of a Cosmatesque Pavement floor was discovered in 2026 at The Church of the Sacred Heart and St. Catherine of Alexandria in Droitwich Spa, Worcestershire. This church is also renowned for its extensive Venetian glass mosaic interior, designed by Gabriel Pippet and mosaiced by Maurice Richard Josey. Hidden under carpet for over 60 years the floor has been recently restored with a grant from the National Lottery Heritage Fund.

The general style of works of the Cosmati school is more closely related to Romanesque art, even though some of the buildings they worked in are Gothic, as in their main lines are their larger structures, especially in the elaborate altar-canopies, with their pierced geometrical tracery. In detail, however, they differ widely from the purer Gothic of northern countries. The richness of effect which the English or French architect obtained by elaborate and carefully worked mouldings was produced in Italy by the beauty of polished marbles and jewel-like mosaics; the details being mostly rather coarse and often carelessly executed.

Ecclesiastical patronage in Rome dried up with the removal of the Papacy to Avignon in 1305, and by the time the curial court had returned and the ensuing schism had been settled a hundred years later, the craft tradition had lapsed. The differential resistance of the stones used in Cosmati work, marbles, porphyry and other coloured stones has resulted in uneven wear on pavements, which have been periodically repaired, whether finely or coarsely, since the late Middle Ages, with the result that modern assessments of the quality of individual works may be compromised by overlooking later repairs.

== Gallery ==
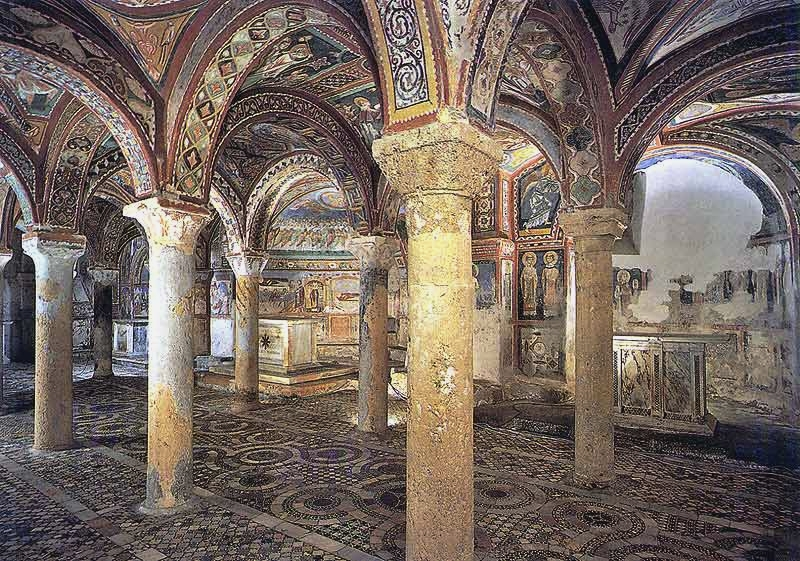
Largest surviving floor by the Cosmati in the crypt of Anagni Cathedral

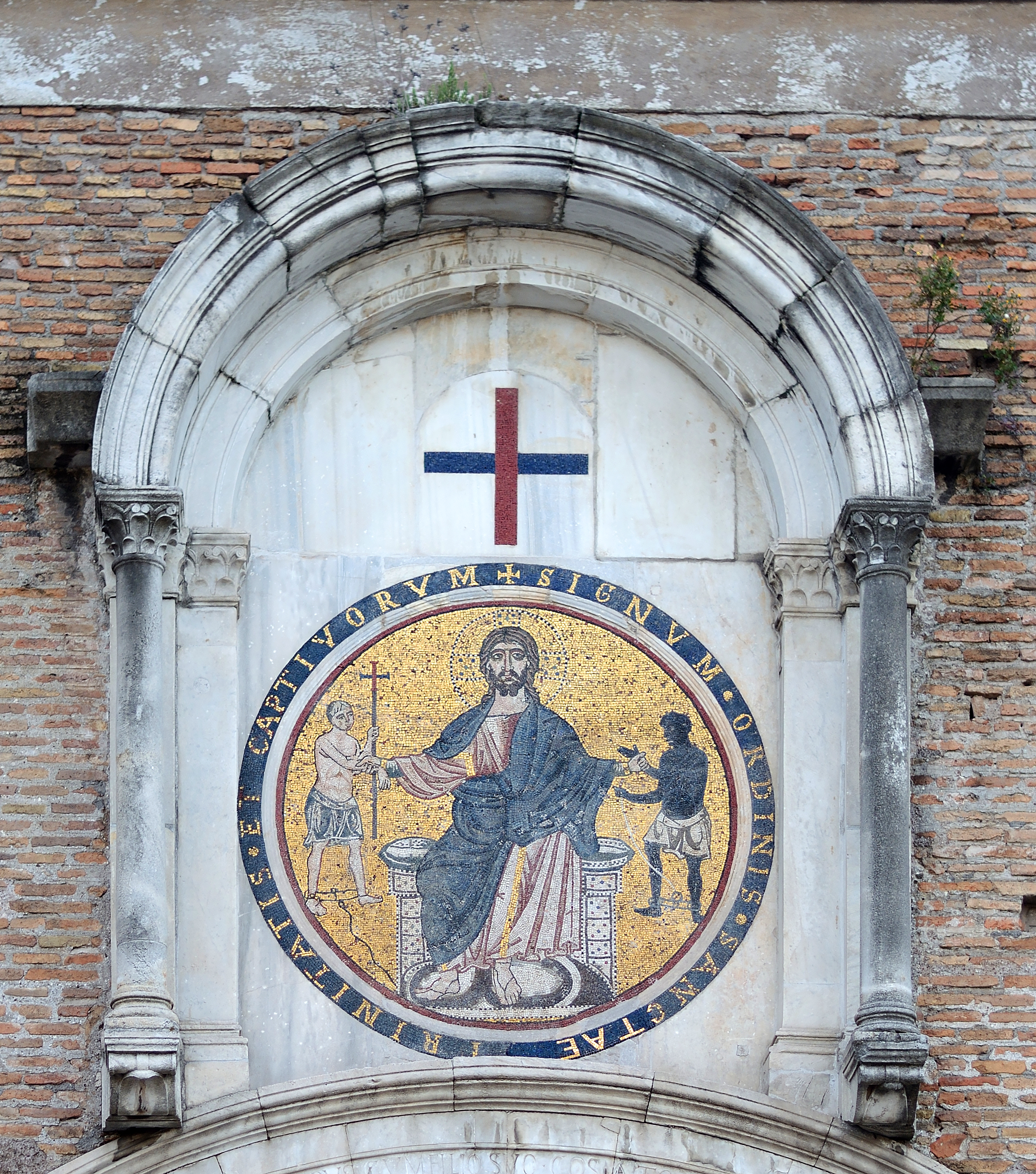
Mosaic by Lorenzo Cosmati depicting Christ between two freed slaves with the symbol of the Trinitarian Order, over the portal of San Tommaso in Formis, 1210

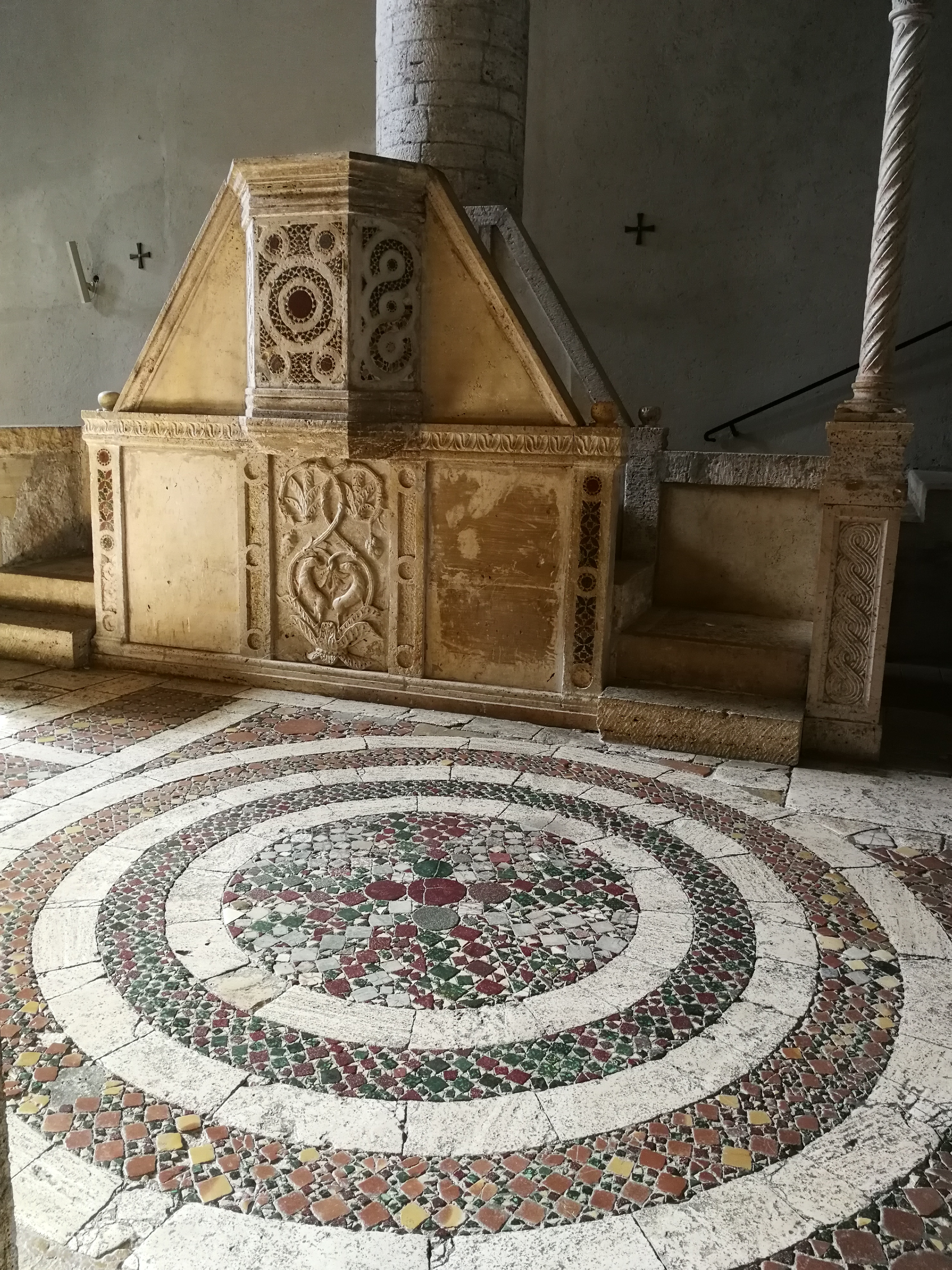
Cosmati pulpit and floor in Santa Maria Assunta in Lugnano in Teverina

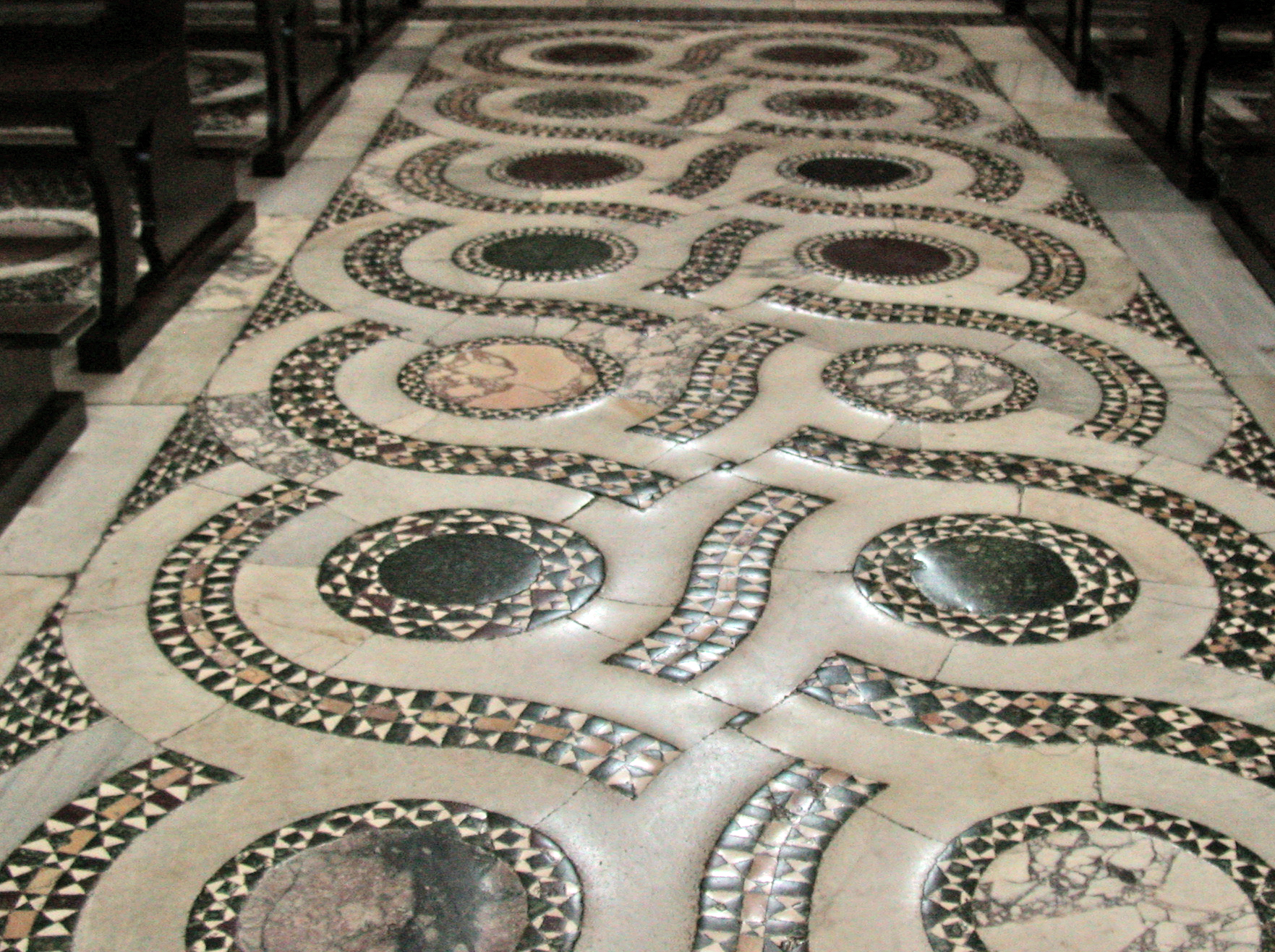
Uneven worn pavement, central nave of the Duomo di San Cesareo in Terracina, southeast of Rome

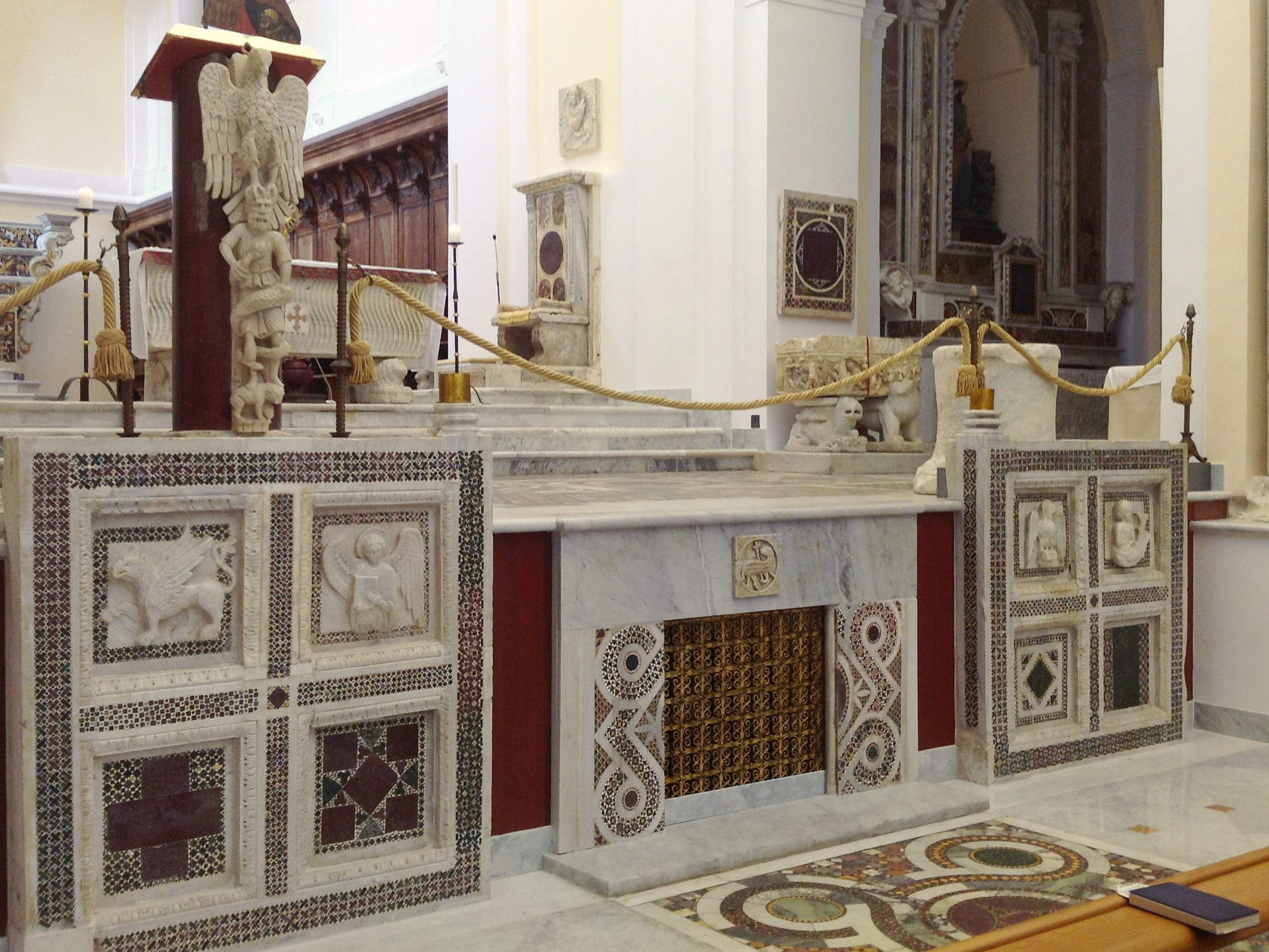
Presbyterium of Cathedral in Gaeta

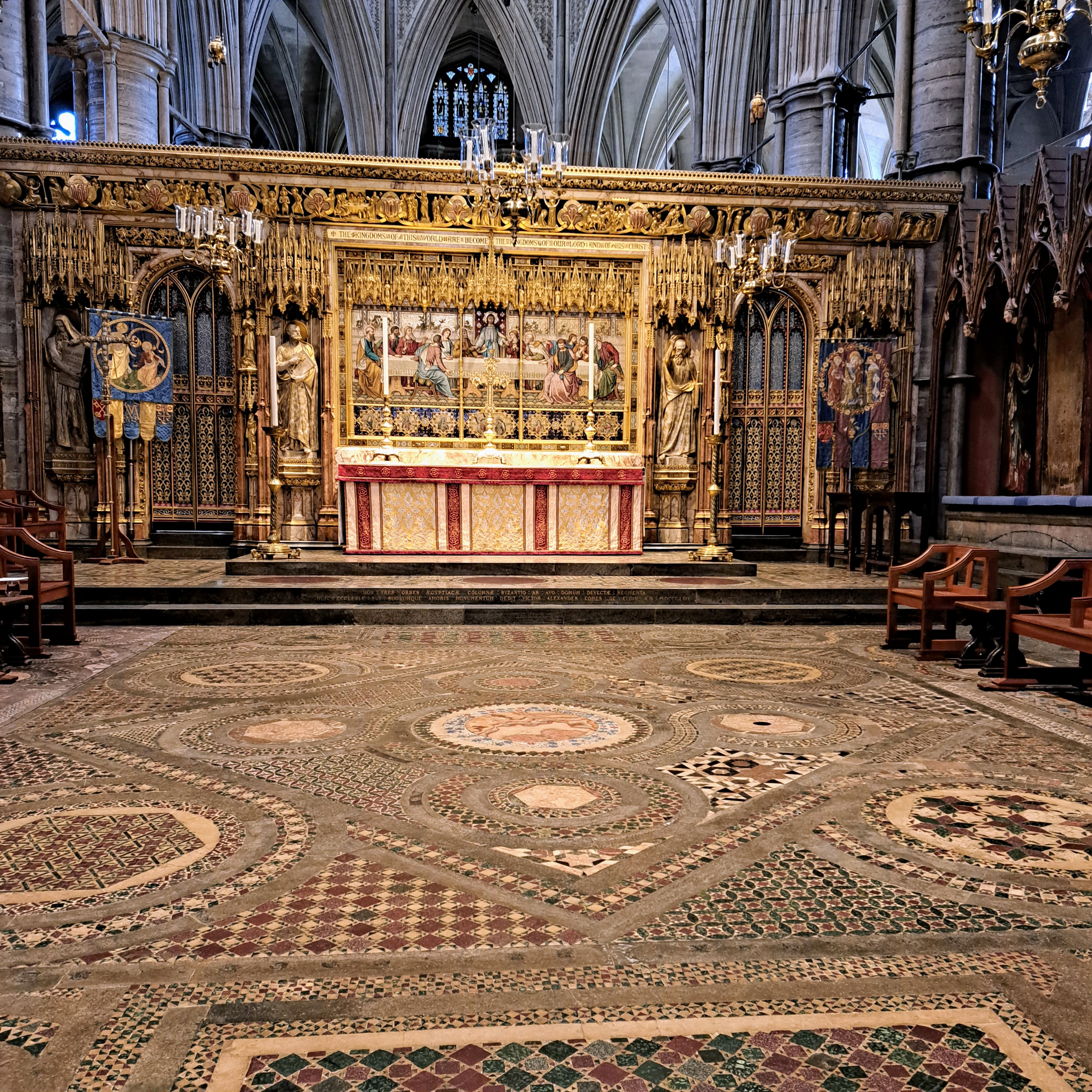
Original mosaics and coronation circle of Westminster Abbey, London
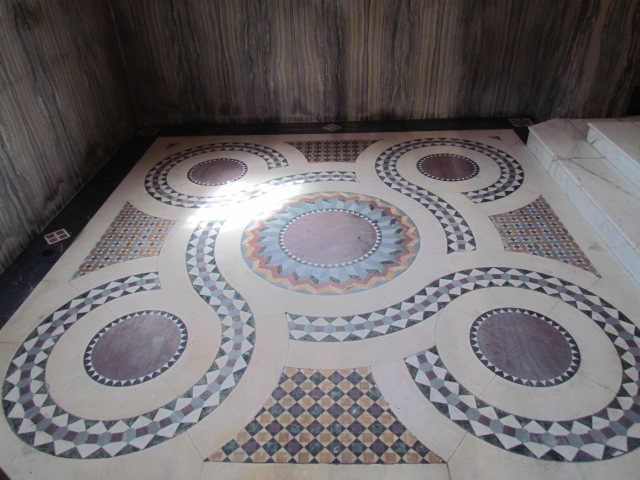
Cosmatesque Pavement found in 2026 at The Church of the Sacred Heart and St. Catherine of Alexandria, Droitwich Spa, England

== Literature ==
- "Cosmati Mosaic" in the Catholic Encyclopedia (1908).
- Dorothy Glass (1984).^{?}
- Linda Grant and Richard Mortimer (2002). Westminster Abbey: The Cosmati Pavements. Courtauld Institute Research Papers, No. 3. Online review
- Paloma Pajarez-Ayuela (2001). Cosmatesque Ornament: Flat Polychrome Geometric Patterns in Architecture. London and New York: WW Norton. Online review
