= Cyril Harrison =

Cyril Harrison may refer to:

- Sir Cyril Harrison (businessman) (1901–1980), British businessman in the cotton industry
- Cyril Harrison (cricketer) (1915–1998), English cricketer
