= John de Rygater =

English university chancellor

John de Rygater (also Rigater) was an English medieval university chancellor.

Between 1239 and 1240, John de Rygater was Chancellor of Oxford University.

Academic offices
Preceded by Simon de Bovill	Chancellor of the University of Oxford; 1239–1240	Succeeded by Richard of Chichester
