= Ralph Bocking =

Ralph Bocking (Note: Also known as Bockyng.) (died 1270), was an English Dominican friar and a native of Chichester, Sussex. He was known for being Saint Richard's confessor, friend and ultimately his biographer.

== Life ==
Bocking was a Dominican friar and hagiographer. A native of Chichester, he was a friend and private confessor of Richard of Chichester. Not much is known about Bocking other than what he reveals about himself in Richard's biography. Richard held the see of Chichester from 1245 till his death in 1253. The canonization of Richard in 1262 provided materials that allowed Bocking to compile a biography of the Saint. It is probable that his long association with Richard provided supplementary material for the biography. After completing the biography Bocking wrote an addendum containing information on miracles attributed to the Saint. In the dedication he explained that he had written the Life by request of Isabel, countess of Arundel, and Robert Kilwardby (chief of the Dominican order in England, and afterwards archbishop of Canterbury). The widowed countess of Arundel had, since her husband's death, devoted her life to piety, including the foundation of an abbey for nuns. Bocking commented that the countess had a vast collection of hagiography in her library.

Bocking's thirteenth-century manuscript containing Richard's biography is housed in the British Museum (MS. Sloane, 1772, ff. 25–70). It was printed in the Bollandists Acta Sanctorum (acts of saints), 1675. under 3 April. A popular abridgment of Ralph's life by John Elmer, manuscripts of which are extant in the British Museum, in the Bodleian, and at York, is printed in Capgrave's 'Nova Legenda Angliæ.' fol. 269 b. Bale attributes to Ralph a series of sermons, but nothing is known of these sermons.

His knowledge of the early church indicate that he was a theologian with a wide classical training. His style of writing has been described, by the Oxford Dictionary of Biography, as "oleaginous", which tended to obfuscate, although his description of the miraculous was said to be "..sparing and sober".

== Saint Richard's prayer ==
Saint Richard is widely remembered today for a popular prayer, that he recited on his deathbed. Bocking was present and transcribed the prayer and it is now recorded in the Acta Sanctorum. The modern version of the prayer, translated from the original Latin, (Note: The original Latin version is: Gratias tibi ago, Domine Jesu Christe, de omnibus beneficiis quae mihi praestitisti; pro poenis et opprobriis, quae pro me pertulisti; propter quae planctus ille lamentabilis vere tibi competebat. Non est dolor similis sicut dolor meus. (Acta Sanctorum. Vol 10. Tertia Aprilis. p. 281. Caput III. 18.) — Foster 2009, pp. 78–83) is:

Day by day,
Dear Lord, of thee three things I pray:
To see thee more clearly,
Love thee more dearly,
Follow thee more nearly,
Day by Day.

— Foster 2009, pp. 78–83
