= Simon de Bovill =

English friar and university chancellor

Simon de Bovill was an English medieval friar and university chancellor.

Brother Simon de Bovill was a Prior of the Preaching Friars in Oxford. Between 1238–9 and 1244–6, Simon de Bovill was twice Chancellor of Oxford University.

Academic offices
Preceded by Ralph Cole	Chancellor of the University of Oxford; 1238–1239	Succeeded by John de Rygater
Preceded by Ralph de Heyham	Chancellor of the University of Oxford; 1244–1246	Succeeded by Gilbert de Biham
