= Norbury House =

Municipal building in Droitwich Spa, Worcestershire, England

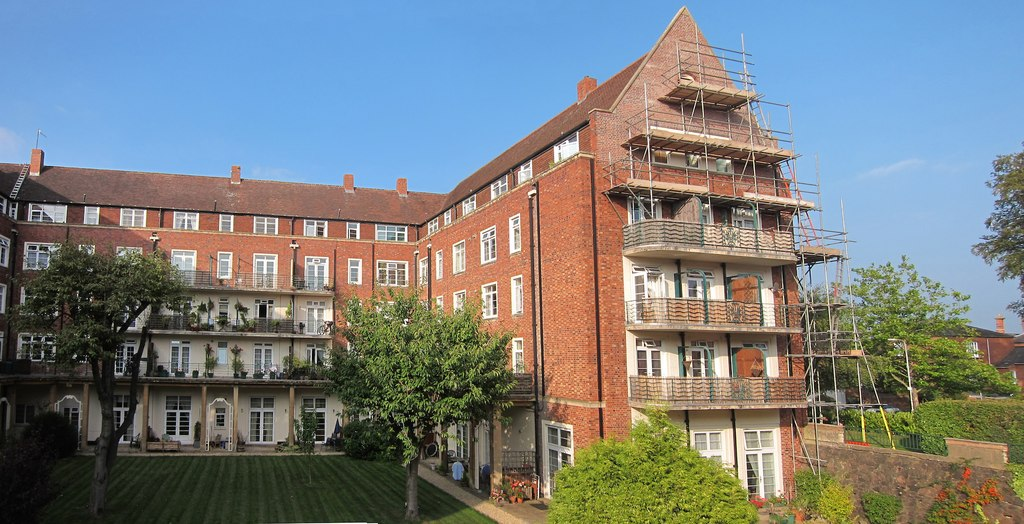
- The building in 2014

- Shown in Worcestershire
- 52.2688°N 2.1504°W
- Location: Friar Street, Droitwich Spa

History
- Built: 1935

Site notes
- Architect(s): Stanley Hall, Easton & Robertson
- Architectural style: Art Deco style

Norbury House is a historic building in Friar Street in Droitwich Spa, a town in Worcestershire, England. Constructed in 1935 as a hotel, replacing an earlier building which stood on the site, it later briefly served as the headquarters of Droitwich Borough Council before being converted to residential and commercial use. It also houses a local community theatre.

== History ==
The first property on the site was a timber-framed structure, built around 1600, which became home to the Norbury family. Captain Coningsby Norbury commanded a naval squadron during the Battle of the Windward Passage in October 1760 during the Seven Years' War. A later member of the family, also known as Coningsby Norbury, was a magistrate and Deputy Lieutenant of Worcestershire, in the early 19th century, and Lieutenant-Colonel Thomas Coningsby Norbury Norbury, served with the 6th Dragoon Guards during the Crimean War. It was later converted into a hotel.

In the early 1930s, the proprietors of the hotel decided to demolish it and construct a modern replacement. The new building was designed by Stanley Hall, Easton & Robertson in the Art Deco style, built in red brick and was completed in 1935. (Note: Historic England holds a photograph of the hotel interior taken in 1936, shortly after its completion.) The guest of honour at the opening ceremony was the noted surgeon, Lord Moynihan who spoke on the suffering caused by rheumatism and the need for the town to participate on research into treatments for the disease. The hotel ran its own spa, which included the St Andrews Brine Baths, capitalising on Droitwich Spa's reputation as a health resort. (Note: An early, and appreciative, guest was George Bernard Shaw who visited in 1936; "we came from Port Meirion (sic) with unnatural velocity, stopping for the night at Norbury House in Droitwich, for £5 worth of luxury".) It only operated until Second World War, when it was requisitioned and used to billet officer cadets. After the war, it was used as a reception centre for recruits to the Auxiliary Territorial Service, and then in the 1950s to house families of serving soldiers. In 1950 the Midlands hospital board developed plans to convert the building into a hospital but these were not taken forward. In 1962, the former ballroom was converted into the Norbury Theatre, and the Droitwich Theatre and Arts Club was established to manage it.

In 1970, Droitwich Borough Council relocated its headquarters from the Old Town Hall into the building. However, the building ceased to be the local seat of government when Wychavon District Council was formed in 1974. The vast majority of the building, apart from the theatre which continues to operate, was subsequently converted into flats and offices.

In 2008, the Droitwich Spa History and Archaeological Society agreed to investigate the possibility of a tunnel connecting St. Augustine's Church at Dodderhill either with the Norbury family vault or, even, with Norbury House itself.

The locally-born actor and comedian, Rik Mayall, was a regular performer at the Norbury Theatre until he died in 2014, and, in 2024, the theatre announced plans to hold a comedy festival in his honour.

== Architecture ==
The five-storey building is constructed of brick, with steep tiled roofs, and has an H-shaped plan. The projecting wings are gabled. The building is described by the architectural historian, Nikolaus Pevsner, as "dull between-the-wars semi-modern", with "mild Deco detail". (Note: Stanley Hall, Easton & Robertson was a London-based architectural firm, founded in around 1931 and specialising in Modernist architecture. Of the three founding partners; Edward Stanley Hall was responsible, along with his father, Edwin Thomas Hall, for the design of the Liberty & Co. department store; John Murray Easton, was responsible for the Loughton tube station, and the Zoology Department Building at the University of Cambridge; and Howard Robertson would later design the Shell Centre in London. The pioneering Australian architect Mary Turner Shaw trained with the firm.) Features include an elaborate corner entrance from Friar Street and a series of French doors with metal balconies on the upper floors. It is fenestrated with metal framed casement windows. There is a sunken garden behind.
