= Ralph de Heyham =

English ecclesiastical chancellor and university chancellor

Ralph de Heyham was an English medieval ecclesiastical chancellor and university chancellor.

Ralph de Heyham was Chancellor of Salisbury. Between 1240 and 1244, he was Chancellor of Oxford University.

Academic offices
| Preceded by Richard of Chichester | Chancellor of the University of Oxford; 1240–1244 | Succeeded by Simon de Bovill |
