= Droitwich Water Tower =

Prominent water tower in Droitwich, England

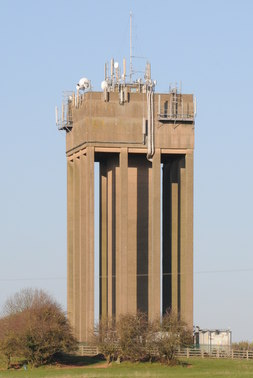
- View of the tower

- Location within Worcestershire

General information
- Type: Water tower
- Location: Droitwich, Worcestershire, England
- Coordinates: 52°15′09″N 02°08′36″W
- Completed: 1962
- Owner: Severn Trent Water

Height
- Height: 110 feet (34 m)

Design and construction
- Main contractor: Currall, Lewis and Martin Ltd.

The Droitwich Water Tower, also known as Yew Tree Hill Water Tower, is a structure on Yew Tree Hill in Droitwich, England, owned and operated by Severn Trent as part of its water supply infrastructure. It was built in 1962 and stands at 110 feet (34 m) tall. The structure is prominent locally, being described as "one of the first things you see when you enter the town".

== Description ==
The tower stands on top of Yew Tree Hill, to the south-east of the town of Droitwich Spa, and is visible from long distances. It was constructed in 1962 by the East Worcestershire Waterworks Company to house a tank containing 150,000 imperial gallons (680,000 L) of water, to improve the local supply pressure. The tower stands 110 feet (34 m) tall and was constructed by Currall, Lewis and Martin Ltd. for the cost of £35,000. The tank is supported on 12 square columns, each 81 feet (25 m) high, around the perimeter of the square structure. The columns are remarkable for their comparative slenderness. A square service shaft in the centre passes through the tank to give access to the tank and roof.

The tower has been described as "very prominent" and "one of the first things you see when you enter the town". It is now owned by the water supply company Severn Trent. The tower mounts several masts and antennae including mobile phone masts for O2, Orange and T-Mobile.

== Recent history ==
The tower was criticised by the Droitwich civic society in 2003. They claimed the aesthetics of the tower had been spoilt by the installation of numerous mobile phone antennae and a complex of "slumlike" huts constructed around its base. The society proposed that the tower be cleaned and painted in a stone or buff colour and that the phone masts and other metal work be painted in pale blue to contrast with the tower and blend in with the sky. Severn Trent accepted that the appearance of the tower was not to the liking of some residents but that it was structurally sound and it preferred to spend money on improving services.

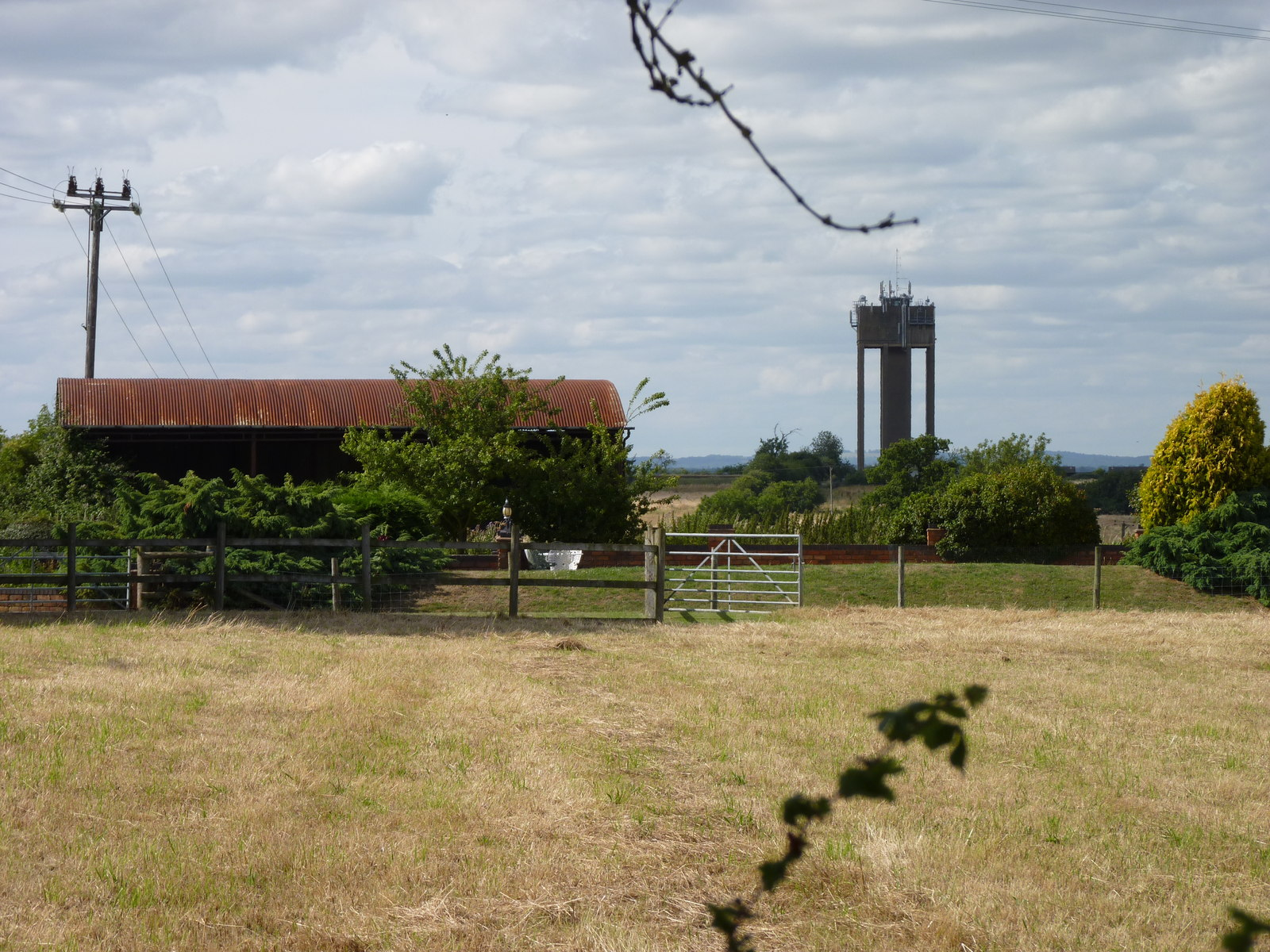
Tower from a distance

In 2015 proposals were made to create a parkland named after and inspired by the water tower to serve an adjacent 250-house development. This would have provided 7.5 hectares (19 acres) of green space, a fruit orchard, natural meadows and a zipwire. A series of grassed mounds would lead from the tower to make a feature out of its height.

The land adjacent to the tower was identified in the 2016 South Worcestershire Development plan as suitable for development into 765 new homes and a 200-unit care home, plus shops, leisure and community facilities. However, the plan noted that any development should not impact on the prominent setting of the water tower. The estate, named Yew Tree Village, was completed by December 2023 around the tower, which now stands adjacent to houses on Dove Crescent.
