= Richard Josey =

Richard Josey

Richard Josey (4 October 1840 – 6 February 1906) was a prominent mezzotint engraver in Victorian London.

== Life ==
Josey was born at Reading, and received his education at the local Reading Blue Coat School. At the age of 13 he was apprenticed to Thomas William Knight, and on the expiration of his apprenticeship he worked in the studio of the Chevalier Ballin. Ballin's influence is evident in Josey's work in stipple and line.

His first commission was reportedly given to him by the firm of Henry Graves and Co., for whom he continued to work for many years. His exhibits at the Royal Academy extended from 1876 to 1887.

Josey engraved a large number of portraits, notably Thomas Carlyle, and Whistler's Mother, after James McNeill Whistler; the Earl of Shaftesbury, after John Everett Millais; Cardinal Manning, after Edwin Long; David Garrick, after Gainsborough; Lord Roberts after Walter William Ouless; and Lord Wolsely and several other portraits after Frank Holl. The National Portrait Gallery, London, has 20 portraits engraved by Josey in its collection.

Departure of the Mayflower (from Delft, The Netherlands) engraved by Richard Josey after Alfred Walter Bayes

Among his more successful religious subjects were "The Finding of Moses," after Frederick Goodall; "Helen on the Walls of Troy," after Lord Leighton; "Preparing for Confirmation," after Burgess; "Hope Nursing Love," and "Crossing the Ford," after Sir Joshua Reynolds; "Gethsemane," after John Spreckley Cuthbert; "Calvary," after Joseph Noel Paton; and "Pity and Love are Akin," after Frank Miles.

Josey also produced engravings of many other subjects.

Josey took a prominent part in Freemasonry, was Past Master of the Ranelagh and Shepherd's Bush Lodges, and was also preceptor of many lodges of instruction.

He married Elizabeth Croxon in 1864. The Joseys had 14 children including a son, Maurice Josey, known as a mosaic artist. Josey's wife died three years before he did, in London.
