= Old Town Hall, Droitwich Spa =

Municipal building in Droitwich Spa, Worcestershire, England

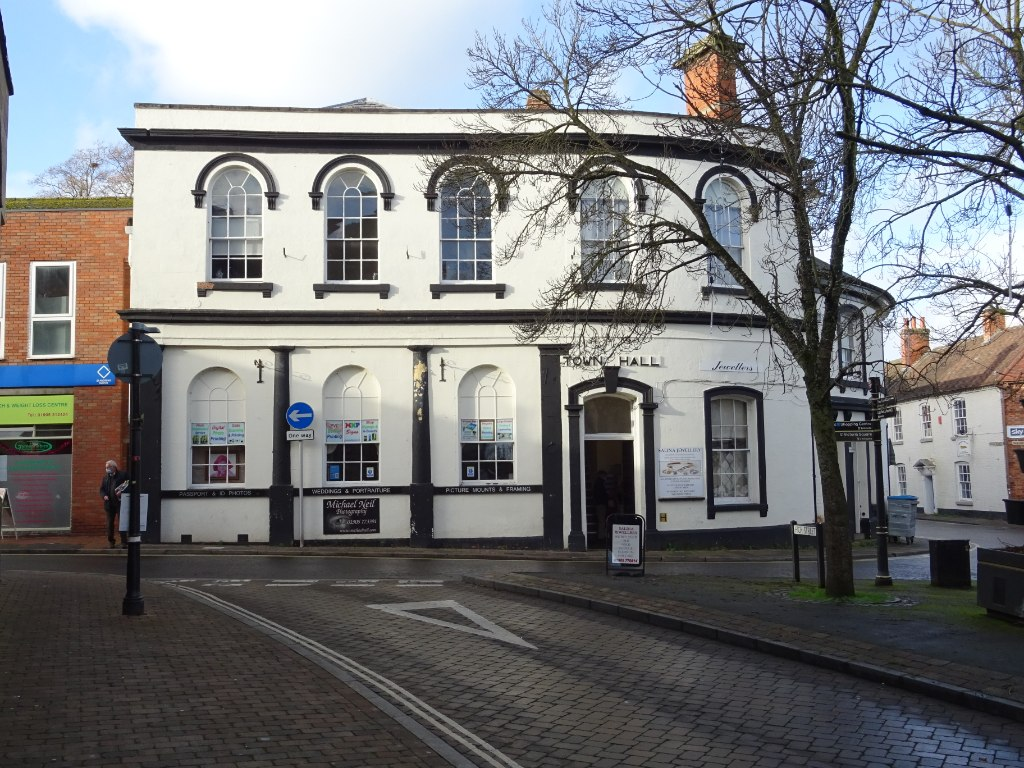
- Old Town Hall, Droitwich Spa

- Shown in Worcestershire
- 52.2685°N 2.1489°W
- Location: St Andrews Street, Droitwich Spa

History
- Built: 1826

Site notes
- Architectural style: Neoclassical style

Listed Building – Grade II
- Official name: Town Hall
- Designated: 24 October 1951
- Reference no.: 1095978

The Old Town Hall is a municipal building in St Andrews Street, Droitwich Spa, Worcestershire, England. The structure, which was the headquarters of Droitwich Spa Borough Council, is a Grade II listed building.

== History ==
The first municipal building on the site was a medieval structure known as the Exchequer Building completed in 1327. The building was used to regulate the salt trade, over which the crown had a near monopoly, to collect the salt tax from people who had the right to extract salt and to deal with all aspects of the administration of the town. The original structure was replaced by a more substantial timber-framed building in 1581. The new Exchequer House featured some fine stained glass which was later removed and installed in St Andrew's Manor House.

In the early 19th century, as part of measures to improve the Worcester to Bromsgrove Turnpike Road which passed along St Andrews Street, civic leaders decided to demolish the Exchequer Building and replace it with a new building slightly to the west of the original building. The new building was designed in the neoclassical style, built in red brick with stucco facing and was completed in 1826. It was arcaded on the ground floor so that markets could be held, with an assembly room on the first floor. The design involved an asymmetrical main frontage with five bays facing onto St Andrews Street with the right hand bay curving round into Friar Street; the St Andrews Street elevation featured Doric order columns on the ground floor and round headed sash windows with moulded architraves on the first floor. The original windows featured fine tracery and there was a cornice and parapet at roof level. The pillory and stocks were kept in front of the town hall.

After significant population growth, largely associated with the salt industry, the area became a municipal borough with the town hall as its headquarters in 1835. The town, which had previously been administered in accordance with a royal charter granted by King James I, had enjoyed extensive flexibility in the way it was managed; the new regime, which imposed a requirement for the council to be democratically elected, gave rise to some opposition and, in protest, the town clerk, initially transferred the town hall to his own name and refused to surrender the charter and other civic documents. The building was extended with a further curve along Friar Street to a design by Henry Rowe in 1867.

In the first part of the 20th century the local fire engine was kept in the arcaded area of the town hall, but in 1940, during the Second World War, the area was partially infilled to create offices and, after the war, it was completely infilled. The building continued to serve as the headquarters of the borough council for much of the 20th century but ceased to be local seat of government when the council moved to Norbury House in Friar Street in 1970. The building was subsequently marketed for sale and then converted for retail use.
