= Sergei Fyodorov (painter) =

Russian icon painter (born 1959)

Sergei Konstantinovich Fyodorov (Russian: Сергей Константинович Фёдоров, alternative English spelling Sergey Fedorov; born 1959 in Pskov, Russia) is a Russian icon painter.

Fyodorov studied in Moscow art school. He worked at Danilov monastery together with his father, Zenon (Зинон or Теодор), the famous Russian icon painter.

For many years, he lived and worked in the UK and his major works in England include icons at Westminster Abbey, Winchester Cathedral also an icon for the shrine of Saint Richard at Chichester Cathedral and a fresco in Rochester Cathedral.

Other works include iconostasis of Church of Christ's Ascension at Nikitskaya ("Smaller Ascension", Церковь "Малое Вознесение") and Russian Orthodox church in Dzintari, Jurmala in Latvia.

Many of his works are in private chapels or private collections.

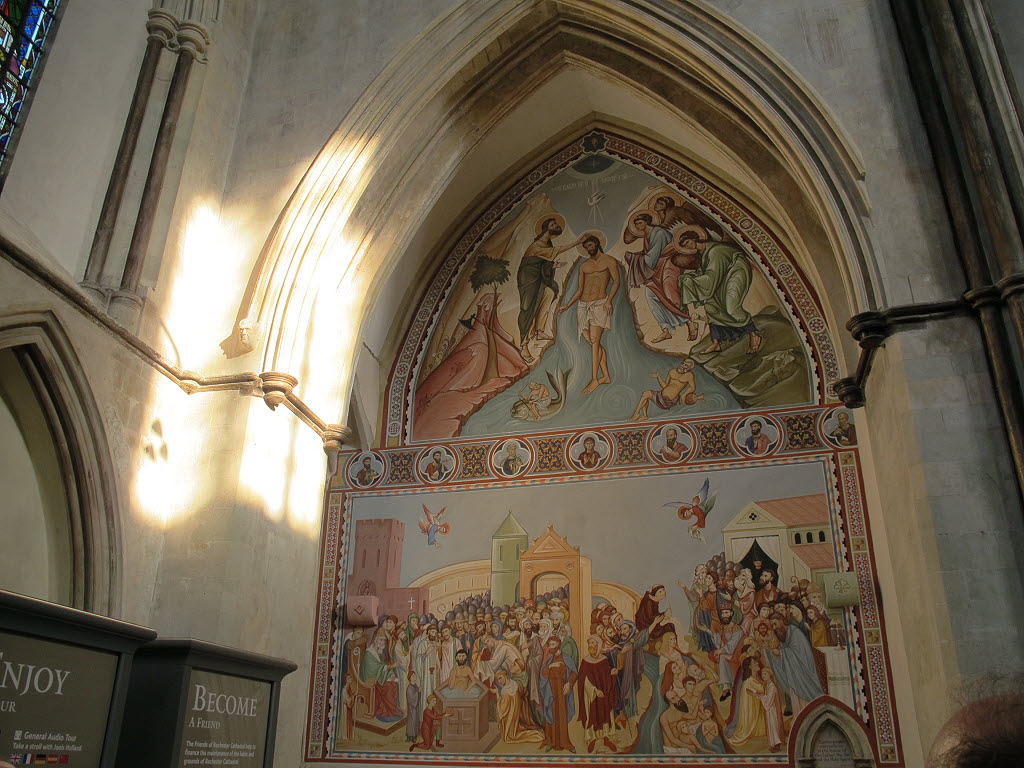
A fresco painted by Sergei Fyodorov in 2004 in the north transept of the Rochester cathedral, depicting the Baptism of Christ and that of the men of Kent.

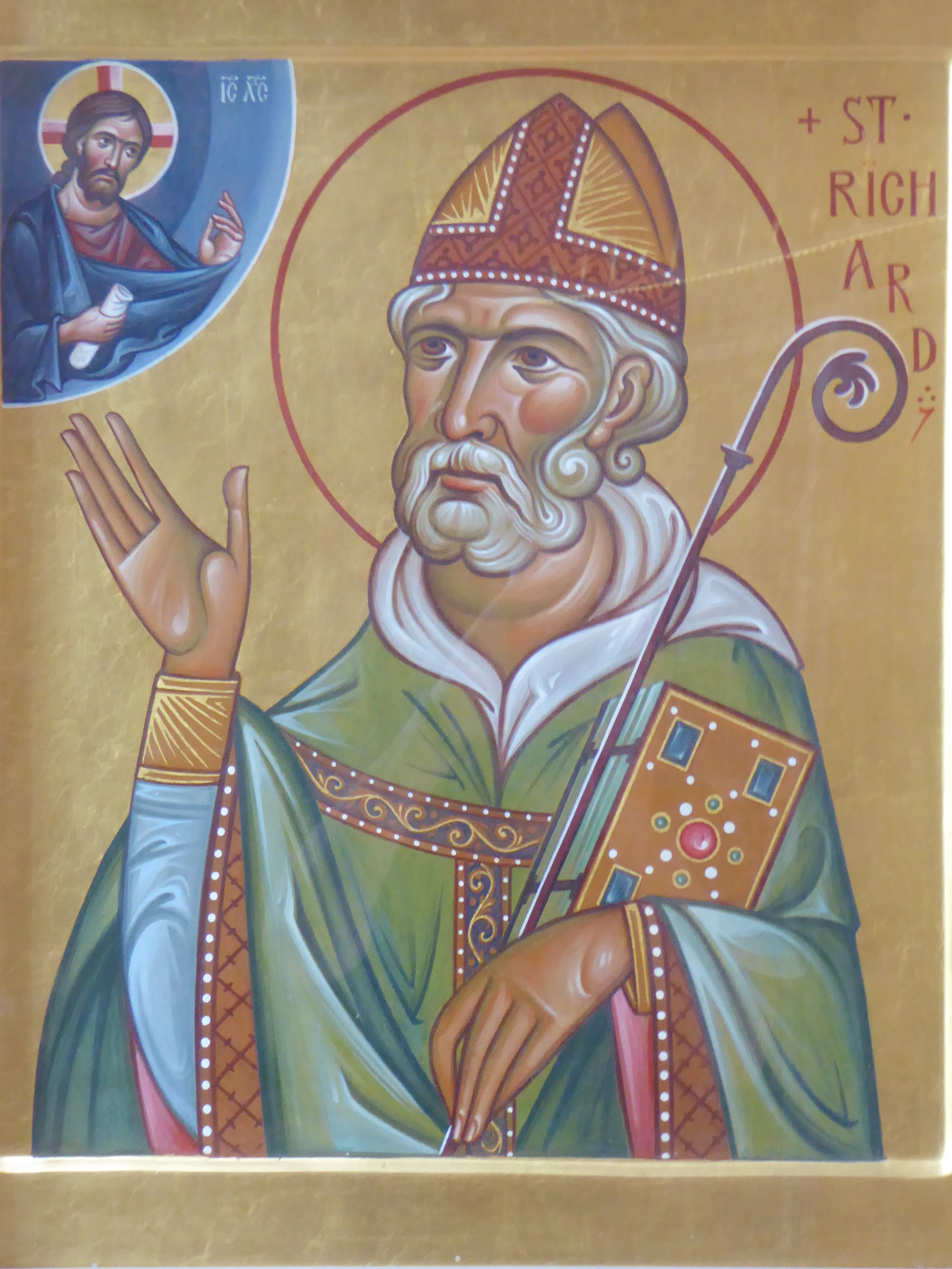
Icon of St Richard in Chichester Cathedral
