= Droitwich Spa =

Town in Worcestershire, England

Coordinates: 52.267°N 2.153°W

- Town
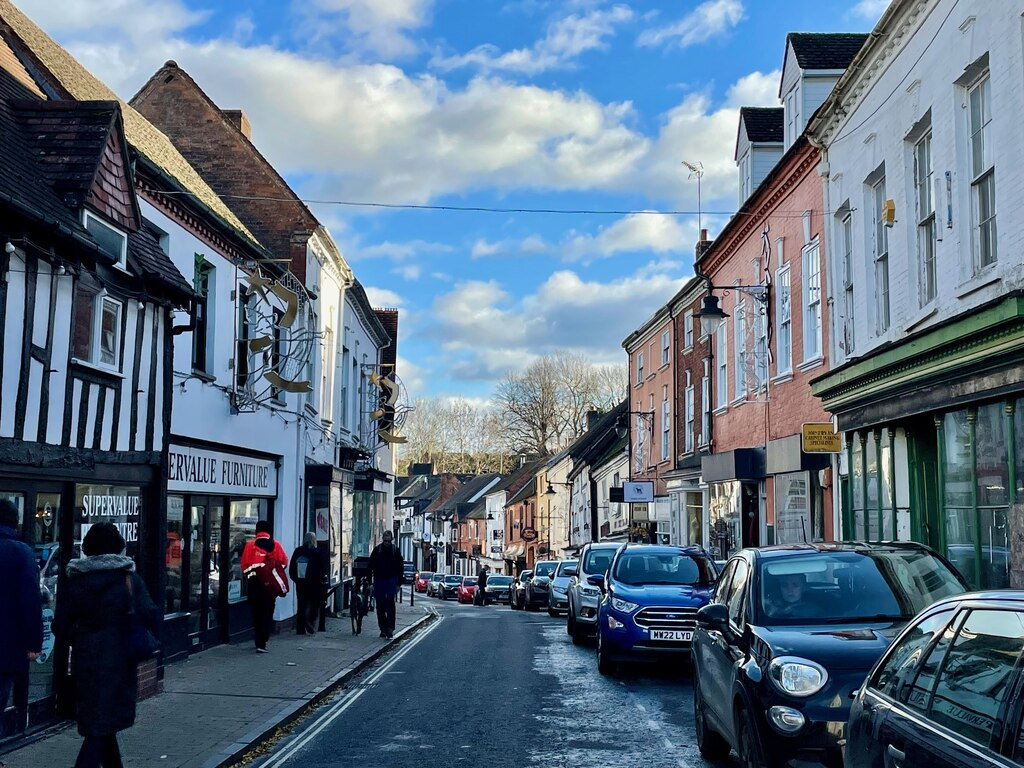
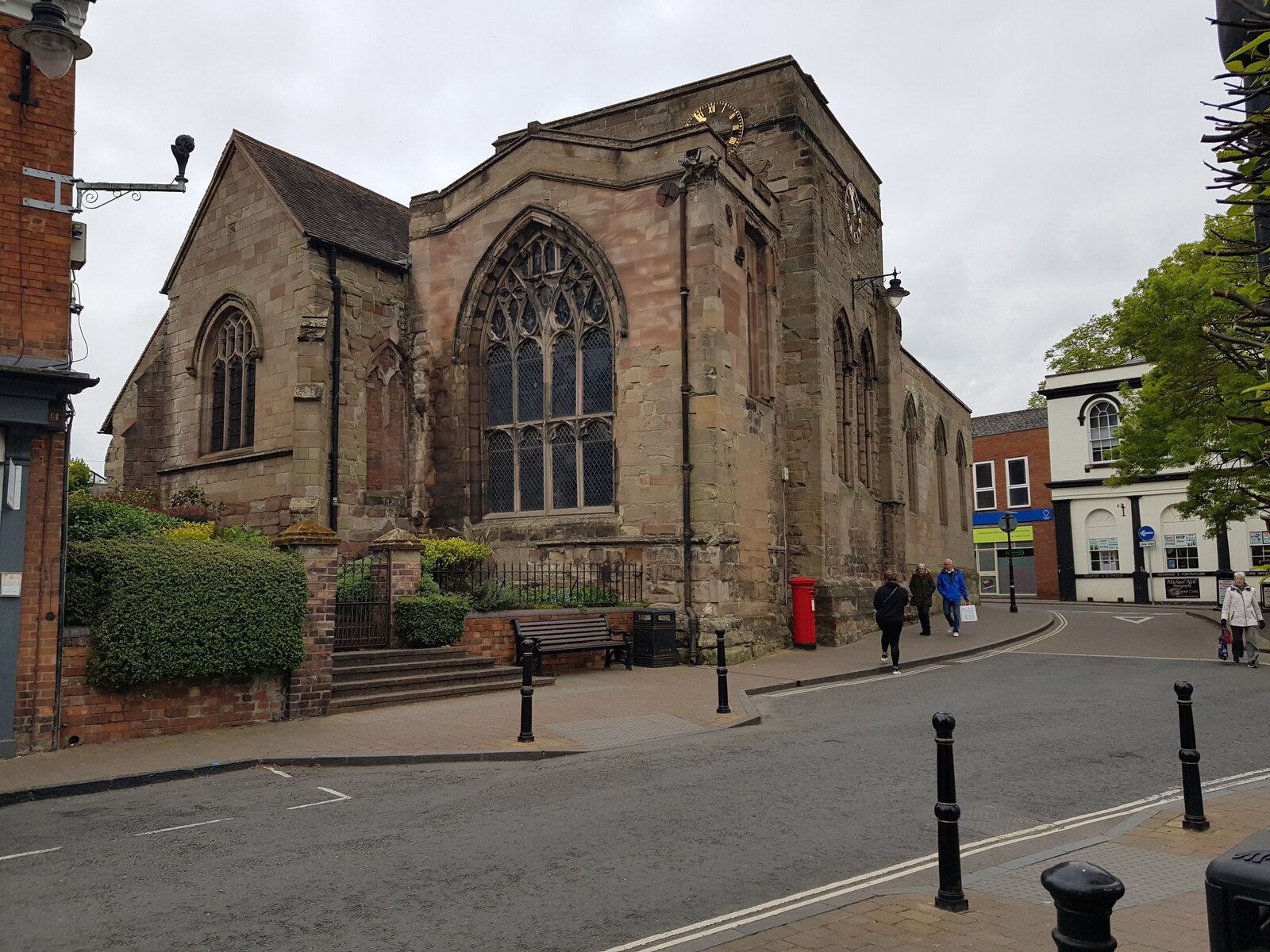
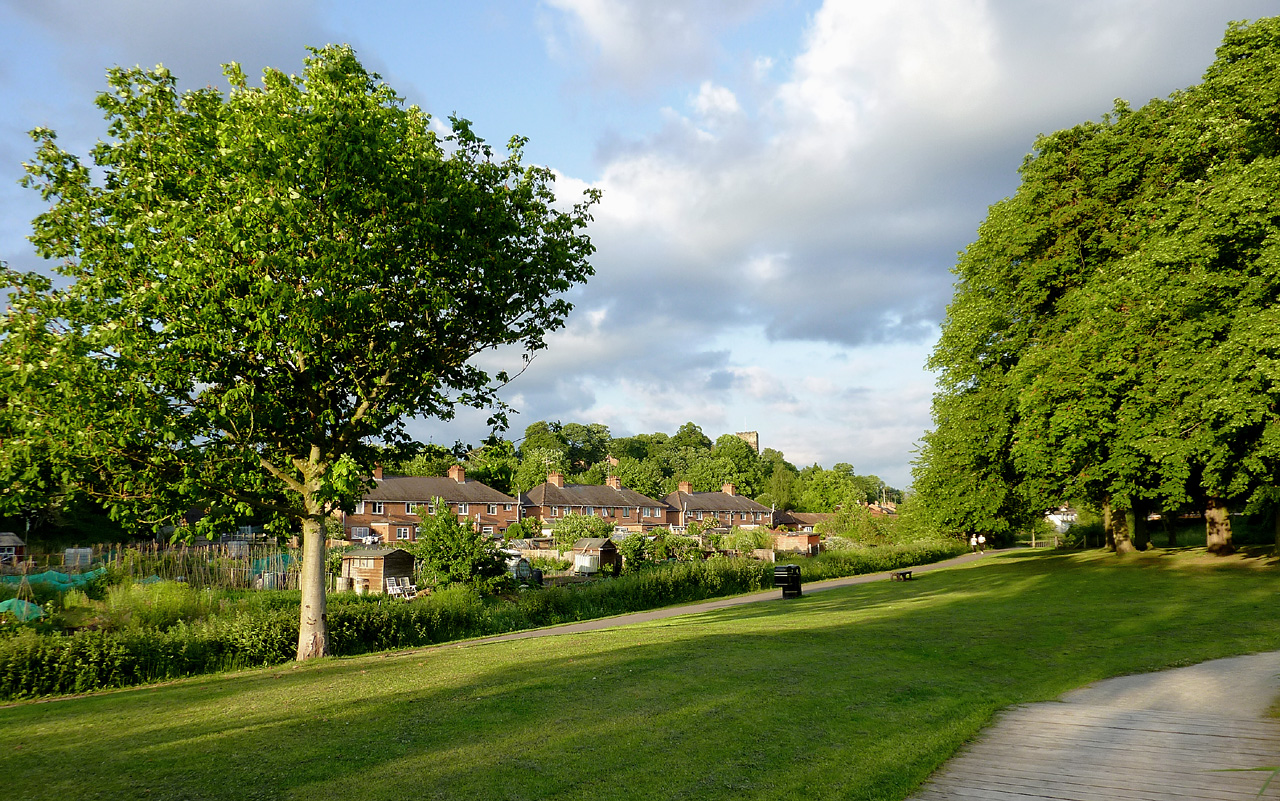
- High Street St Andrews Church Vines Park

- Location within Worcestershire
- Area: 8.366 km^{2} (3.230 sq mi)
- Population: 25,027 (2021 Census)
  - Density: 2,992/km^{2} (7,750/sq mi)
- OS grid reference: SO895632
  - London: 125 miles (201 km)
- Civil parish: Droitwich Spa
- District: Wychavon
- Shire county: Worcestershire
- Region: West Midlands
- Country: England
- Sovereign state: United Kingdom
- Post town: DROITWICH
- Postcode district: WR9
- Dialling code: 01905
- Police: West Mercia
- Fire: Hereford and Worcester
- Ambulance: West Midlands
- UK Parliament: Droitwich and Evesham

Droitwich Spa (often abbreviated to Droitwich /ˈdrɔɪt.wɪtʃ/) is an historic spa town and civil parish in the Wychavon district, in northern Worcestershire, England, on the River Salwarpe. It is located approximately 22 miles (35 km) south-west of Birmingham and 7 miles (11 km) north-east of Worcester. In 2021 the parish had a population of 25,027.

The town was called Salinae in Roman times, then later called Wyche, derived from the Anglo-Saxon Hwicce kingdom, referred to as "Saltwich" according to Anglo-Saxon charters, with the Droit (meaning "right" in French) added when the town was given its charter on 1 August 1215 by King John. The "Spa" was added in the 19th century when John Corbett developed the town's spa facilities. The River Salwarpe running through Droitwich is likely derived from sal meaning "salt" and weorp which means "to throw up" - i.e. "the river which throws up salt" - which overflows from the salt brines.

The town is situated on massive deposits of salt, and salt has been extracted there since ancient times. The natural Droitwich brine contains 2 1/2 pounds per imperial gallon (0.25 kg/L) of salt, ten times stronger than sea water and rivalled only by the Dead Sea.

== History ==
During the Roman era the settlement was known as Salinae and was located at the crossroads of several Roman roads. Railway construction in 1847 revealed Roman mosaic pavements. In the ninth century Historia Brittonum, a text that discusses various landscape folklore across Britain, the hot spring of Droitwich Spa appears to be described in a passage that suggests that the spa was still built up at that time: "The third marvel is a hot pool, which is in the country of the Hwicce [near Worcester] and is surrounded by a wall made of bricks and stone. Men go into it to bathe at all times, and the temperature changes for each of them as they wish: if one man wants a cold bath, it will be cold, and if another wants a hot bath, it will be hot."

King John's charter was renewed by James VI and I on 8 November 1625, establishing the governance of the town and markets. Droitwich remained a fairly small town until the 1960s, when the population was still barely 7,000, but since then it has grown considerably from overspill from Birmingham with many housing estates being developed in the 1970s and 1980s. In 2014, new housing consent was granted to large developments at Copcut (750 houses) and Yew Tree Hill (765 houses) with a number of other in-fill developments

In July 2007, Droitwich was hit heavily by the UK-wide flooding caused by some of the heaviest rainfall in many years. The flooding was pictured in UK-wide news, having flooded the majority of the heavily subsided high street. Many shops in the high street remained closed almost a year later.

=== Salt and brine ===
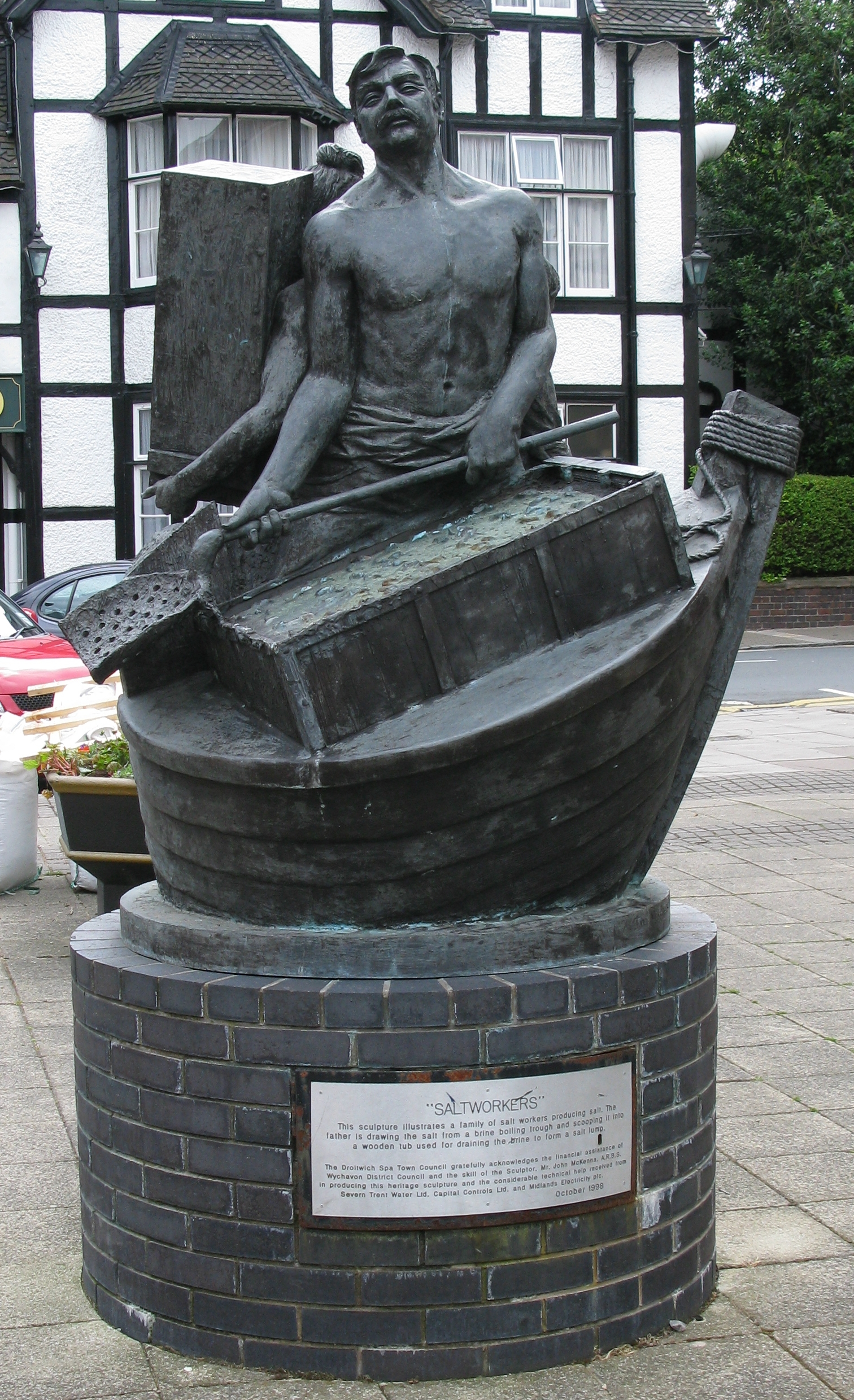
Saltworkers by British sculptor John McKenna in the town centre

Rock salt and brine was extracted by the Romans and this continued through to the Middle Ages. A salt tax was levied by the king until it was abolished in 1825. A local family named Wintour owned up to 25 salt evaporating pans in the area by the 1600s.

Brine rose naturally to the surface at three sites along the River Salwarpe within Vines Park in the centre of Droitwich. Unusually the brine was fully saturated with sodium chloride, and was extremely valuable because it was economic to boil, and the yield of salt was high. Because of its value the brine was divided into shares, one share comprising 6,912 imperial gallons (31,420 L) which produced eight long tons (8.1 t) of salt annually in the set boiling period. When it rained, particularly in the winter when brine was not being boiled, the rain water which is less dense than saltwater, settled on top of the brine and was readily removed.

Originally brine for boiling was extracted with buckets lowered into the pits which were naturally replenished. Upwich, the deepest of the three pits at 30 feet (9.1 m), supplied most of the brine, while the pit at Netherwich was only 18 feet (5.5 m) deep. The Middlewich pit, located between the two, was adversely affected by brine extraction at the other two pits and fell into disuse. Steynor in the 17th century discovered the pit and set up business for himself, but eventually due to the lack of brine he failed to compete with the town monopoly.

The underground brine reservoirs were only 200 feet (61 m) deep and in 1725 boreholes were sunk to the base of the pits, accessing brine in almost unlimited quantities and independent of the natural brine flow, and the monopoly ceased. Pumps were used to draw brine, and production increased. As a result, parts of the town succumbed to subsidence.

In the mid-19th century, Droitwich became famous as a spa town. Unlike other places, the medicinal benefits were not derived from drinking the spa water, which is almost saturated brine, but from the muscular relief derived from swimming and floating in such a dense, concentrated salt solution, at the town's brine baths (first opened in 1830). The spa water at Droitwich is the warmest in the United Kingdom outside Bath, but it does not meet the most common definition of a hot spring as the water is below standard human body temperature.

The original Brine Baths have long since closed, but a new brine bath (part of the Droitwich Spa private hospital) opened to the public for relaxation and hydrotherapy but this too was closed in December 2008 due to a dispute between the operator and Wychavon District Council over health and safety inspections.

The salt industry was industrialised and developed in the 19th century by John Corbett who built the nearby Chateau Impney for his Franco-Irish wife in the French 'château' style. He was responsible for the redevelopment of Droitwich as a Spa.

=== Asylums, workhouses and the town hall ===
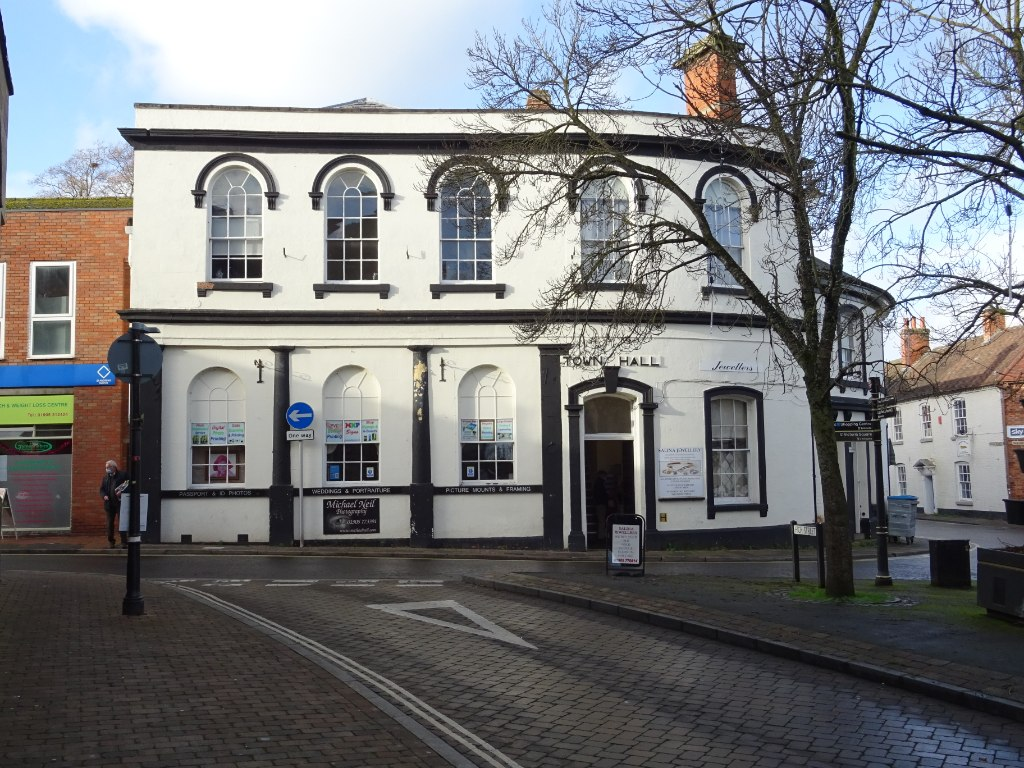
The Old Town Hall

Droitwich's first workhouse was set up on Holloway in 1688 and the last finally abolished in the 1920s.

Droitwich Lunatic Asylum was established in 1791. Records at the Worcestershire County Record Office show its presence in 1837 to 1838. An advert in the Transactions of the Provincial Medical and Surgical Association (the forerunner of the British Medical Association) in 1844, records that Martin Ricketts, of Droitwich, was the Surgeon and Sir Charles Hastings from the Worcester Infirmary was the Physician.

The Old Town Hall, which is in St Andrews Street, was completed in 1826.

== Industry and commerce ==
=== Transport ===
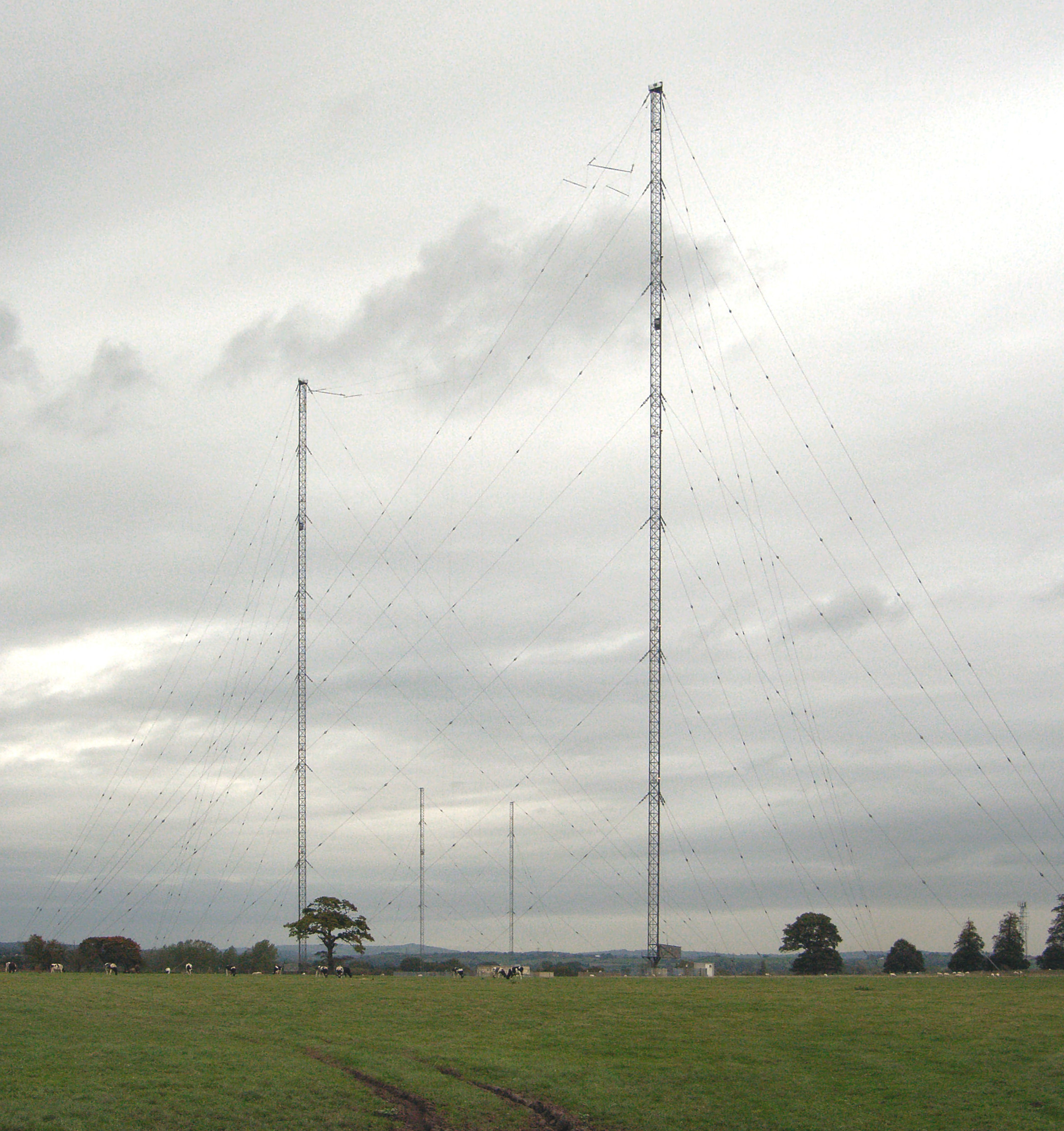
Droitwich transmitting station, Wychbold

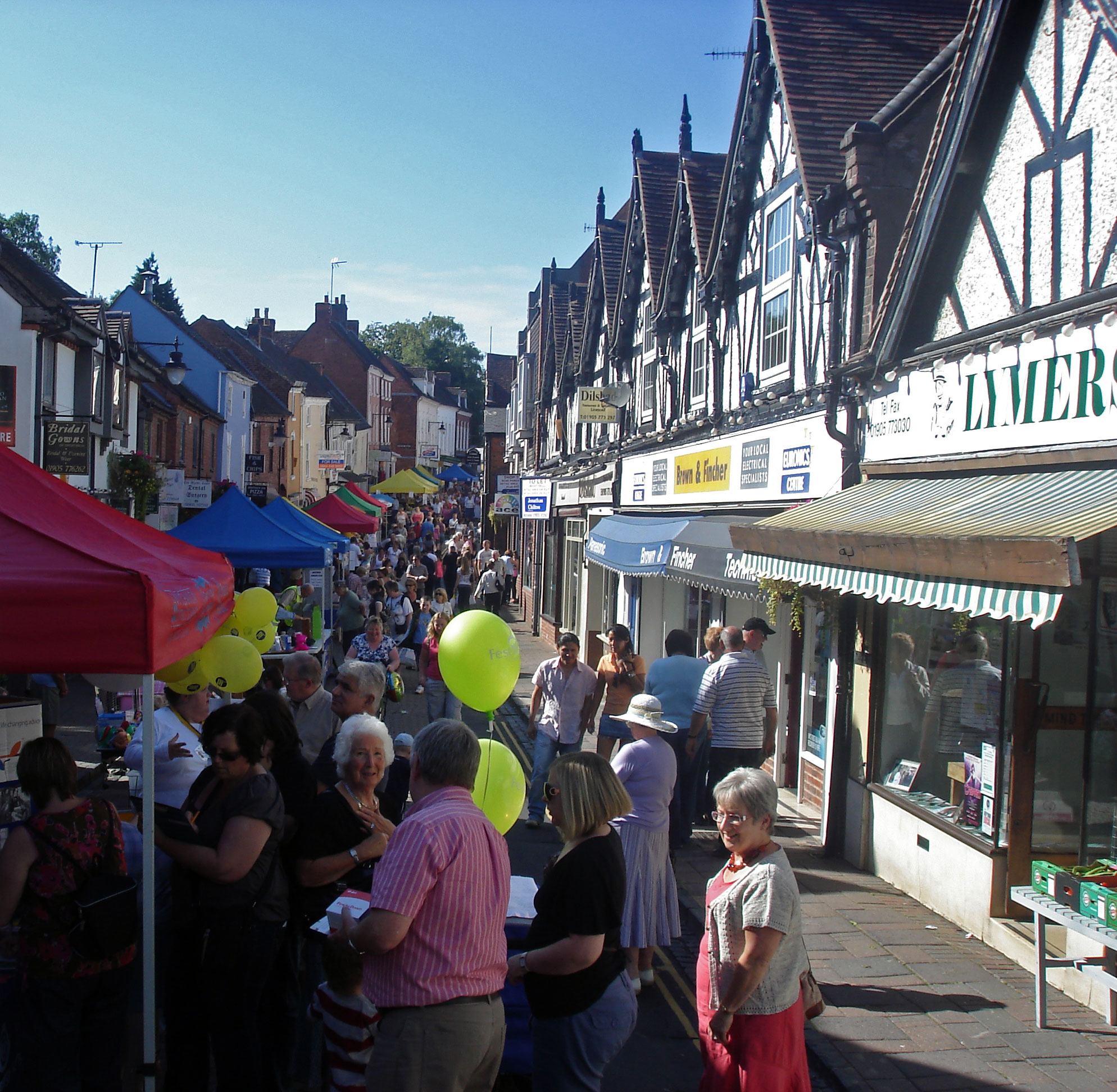
Droitwich Spa High Street on St. Richard's Day 2009

In 1714 the first Turnpike in Worcestershire was opened to Worcester. A commemorative plaque was unveiled by Lt. Col. Patrick Holcroft the Lord Lieutenant of Worcestershire in Victoria Square on 1 June 2014.

Collectively known as the Droitwich Canal, two canals met in the town centre. These are the Droitwich Barge Canal built by James Brindley in 1771 and the Droitwich Junction Canal built in 1854. The Junction canal linked Droitwich to the Worcester and Birmingham Canal. The canals were abandoned in 1939 but a restoration program saw them re-opened in 2011.

The railway station, formerly on the Great Western Railway, is just outside the town centre with trains to Birmingham, Worcester, Kidderminster and Stourbridge.

Regular buses operate from the town centre to Worcester and Bromsgrove along with town services and an infrequent service (133) to Kidderminster. These are operated by various operators.

=== Broadcasting ===
3 mi (5 km) north-east of Droitwich is the central longwave broadcasting facility for the UK, (Wychbold BBC transmitter), which is also used for transmissions in the medium wave range; see Droitwich transmitting station. The transmitting station was sited near Droitwich, which was close to UK centres of population when it was established in the 1930s. Considerable care was taken to avoid placing the masts above underground brine, due to the risk of subsidence; however, there are anecdotal reports that the huge block of underground salt was desirable by providing good grounding and increased signal strength.

=== Retail ===
Droitwich shopping is mainly focused in the traditional town centre around Victoria Square, leading to the St Andrew's Square shopping centre and down to the original High Street, with its local pubs and an eclectic mix of traditional shops. Farmers' markets are also held regularly in Victoria Square.

In the central St Andrew's Square shopping precinct are several chain stores. On 14 July 2005, Waitrose opened a new supermarket on the grounds of the old covered market, directly behind the heavily subsided High Street. In 2008, a new Aldi store opened on the small retail park by Roman Way while the new Parkridge Retail Park was opened in 2007 with two new stores: Carpetright (since closed) and Land of Leather. There was also a Horsatack Saddlery store on the same park, which opened in 2009. The park already has a DFS store. There is also a Spar on Oakland Avenue, a Tesco Express on Primsland Way, a Sainsbury's store and petrol station, and a new Marks & Spencer store and petrol station. In 2019 a Lidl supermarket opened opposite Aldi, increasing competition in the area.

In 2026 a retail banking hub was opened allowing residents to access banking services from HSBC, Santander, Lloyds, Nat West and Barclays. These are banks that previously had dedicated branches in Droitwich but closed over time. There are also a number of estate agents.

== Amenities ==
=== Lido ===
Until the late 1990s Droitwich Spa Lido was open as a public open-air salt-water swimming pool. Following its closure various schemes were proposed, with significant legal and commercial arguments as to the viability of re-building and reopening this facility.

During autumn of 2006, work started on renovating the lido and it was reopened on Monday 18 June 2007. The Lido Park contains the Droitwich Cricket Ground on its edge and a bandstand with regular performances.

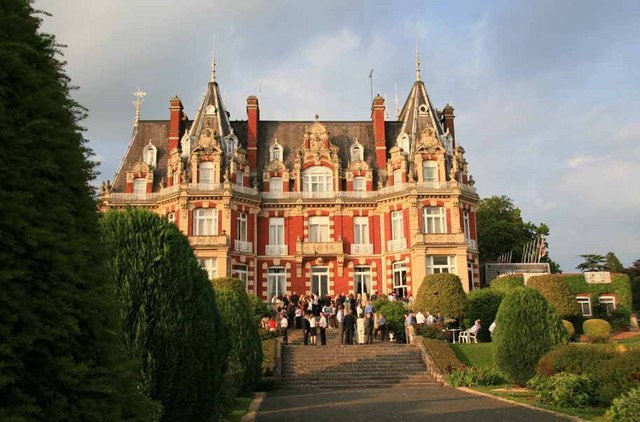
Chateau Impney, near Droitwich

=== Entertainment ===
The Norbury Theatre hosts regular shows year-round, including an annual pantomime, and also shows films.

On the outskirts of the town is the famous Chateau Impney, built in the style of a traditional French chateau, which is now a hotel, restaurant and conference centre. In Droitwich, the grade II listed Raven Hotel was a wattle and daub hotel held a central position within the town, on the afternoon of 10 August 2025, the hotel was severely damaged by an arson attack and destroyed in the process.

== Education ==
The Droitwich Spa pyramid of schools operates on a three tier system, with one high school (Droitwich Spa High School); two middle schools (Witton Middle School and Westacre Middle School); and nine first schools (Chawson, Cutnall Green, Hindlip, Ombersley, St. Peter's, St. Joseph's — a primary school feeding into Blessed Edward Oldcorne Catholic College, Worcester —, Tibberton, Westlands — originally Boycott Farm First School —, and Wychbold First Schools). There is also the private Dodderhill School (formerly named Whitford Hall and Dodderhill), an independent school for girls aged 3 to 16 years (with some boys attending the nursery school). In 2019, the school merged with the Royal Grammar School (RGS) Worcester, under the name RGS Dodderhill.

Droitwich children are also educated at schools outside the town including Worcester's Royal Grammar School and the King's School, Hawford Lodge, the Grange, Bromsgrove School with others typically travelling to Birmingham, Kidderminster, Hagley and Stourbridge by rail.

== Media ==
Regional local news and television programmes are provided by BBC West Midlands and ITV Central. Television signals are received from either the Bromsgrove or Sutton Coldfield TV transmitters.

Local radio stations are BBC Hereford and Worcester, Heart West Midlands, Radio Wyvern, Capital Mid-Counties, Greatest Hits Radio Herefordshire & Worcestershire, Hits Radio Herefordshire & Worcestershire, and Smooth West Midlands.

The Droitwich Standard is the town's weekly local newspaper.

== Places of worship ==
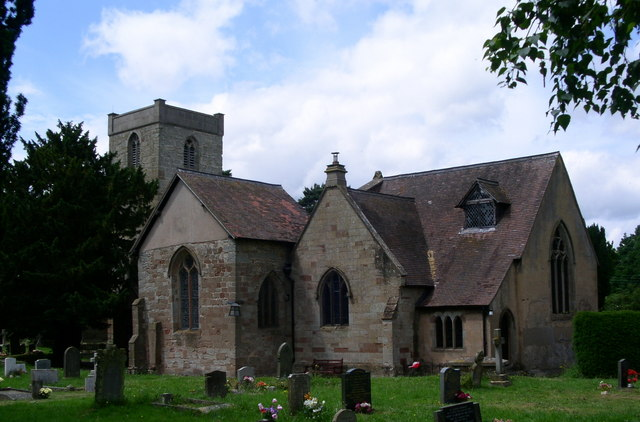
St Peter's Church

There are six churches in Droitwich including the Anglican church of St Andrew's, a Norman building where St Richard was probably baptised. The church tower was demolished in the 1920s after becoming dangerous due to land subsidence. St. Augustine's at Dodderhill, completed in 1220 and rebuilt in the 18th century on a hill, was the site of a former Roman fort and a later Anglo-Saxon church. St Peter's, built on the site of a former Saxon church, has parts, including the chancel, that date from Norman times, and has a memorial to Edward Winslow, one of the Pilgrim Fathers, who was born in the parish.

St Nicholas was built in Victorian times near the railway station.

The Church of the Sacred Heart and St Catherine of Alexandria is a Roman Catholic Church styled on the Roman basilica churches of Ravenna in Italy and is often referred to as "England's Ravenna". The church is believed to be unique in the world because the interior walls are covered almost entirely with eight tonnes of mosaic glass, imported from Murano in Venice, above a marble lower level. The church also has a very rare Cosmatesque or Cosmati Pavement floor in its Lady Chapel, one of a handful in existence outside Italy. The church art was designed by the renowned artist Gabriel Pippet. and mosaiced by Maurice Richard Josey with a teenager, Fred Oates, helping. In 2025 and 2026 the mosaic interior walls and floors were professionally cleaned and restored with support from the National Lottery Heritage Fund. The church attracts large numbers of visitors from around the world and is regarded by many as one of the most beautiful churches in England.

There are also a number of other chapels including Methodist, Baptist chapels and a vibrant Salvation Army hall. In 2018 the tired 1970s Emmanuel Church building at Chawson was refurbished alongside a new retail development.

== Sport ==
Droitwich leisure centre at Briar Mill has gym facilities, sports halls, a swimming pool and squash courts. There are also outside football and astroturf pitches with floodlighting. The centre also runs a squash league.

Droitwich Spa Football Club was formed in 1985 and currently plays in the Hellenic League Premier Division. Their home ground is also at Briar Mill. The club also has a junior section of Under 16, Under 18 & Under 21 sides.

The Droitwich Rugby Football Club has been playing rugby union since 1972. Droitwich Archery Society, based at the Droitwich Rugby Football Ground, is a target archery club that was formed in 1967, and is affiliated to The Grand National Archery Society. Other local sports include boxing, judo, Tae Kwon Do, Karate, Ju Jitsu and tennis.

Vines Park Bowling Club is a green bowling club situated by the canal in Vines Park. Bowling also available in the Lido Park Droitwich Spa Pool League is headquartered at the Fox and Goose pub on Westlands.

Droitwich Spa also has a cricket club in which they support four Saturday teams and two on a Sunday.

Droitwich Tennis Club (f.1920), staged two notable tournament throughout its history the Droitwich Open that ran from 1928 to 1939, and the Droitwich Open Hard Courts from 1968 to 1974.

Entw9 Dance School, owned by Lois Press, runs from a studio in St Andrew's Square, offering dance training for children aged 3 and over and regular performances around Droitwich.

== Notable residents ==
- Ginny Lemon, drag queen best known for their appearance on the second series of Rupauls Drag Race (UK)
- John Bickerton, European Tour golfer
- John Corbett, "Salt King"
- Ashley Giles, England cricketer, lives in Droitwich and in 2005 was made an honorary citizen of the town
- Charlie Green, singer known for his appearance on Britain's Got Talent in 2008; now touring with Jimmy Osmond
- Cyril Harrison, professional cricketer, made 17 first-class cricket appearances for the Worcestershire County Cricket Club in 1934 and 1935
- John Heminges, born in Droitwich in about 1566, actor in William Shakespeare's company
- Dean Holdsworth, former professional footballer for Wimbledon
- Rik Mayall, actor and writer in The Comic Strip, The Young Ones, Bottom and other TV programmes; lived in Droitwich as a child
- Matt Neal, Touring Car champion, lives in Droitwich
- Graham Oakey, professional footballer for Coventry City in the 1970s, born in Droitwich in 1954
- Thomas Rainsborough, prominent figure in the English Civil War; leading spokesman for the Levellers in the Putney Debates; became MP for Droitwich in 1647
- St Richard, Bishop of Chichester, born in Droitwich in 1197
- Edward Winslow, one of the Pilgrim Fathers, born in the town in 1595
- Rebecca Redfern, visually-impaired para-swimmer and 2024 Summer Paralympics gold medallist
- British heavy metal band Grim Reaper was formed in Droitwich in 1979.

== Twin towns ==
Droitwich Spa is twinned with:

- Bad Ems, Germany
- Voiron, France, (since 2010)

== See also ==
- Droitwich Water Tower
