= Cyril Harrison (cricketer) =

English cricketer

Cyril Stanley Harrison (11 November 1915 – 28 May 1998) was an English first-class cricketer: a left-handed batsman and slow left arm bowler who made 17 first-class appearances for Worcestershire in 1934 and 1935.

He made his debut against Glamorgan in June 1934, taking three wickets in the match including that of Arnold Dyson in both innings. A fortnight later against Hampshire he claimed a career-best 7-51, but he was never to achieve anything like that success again, taking more than one wicket in only two more games. He did, however, manage his modest best score with the bat (28) against Lancashire in July.

Harrison played in two of Worcestershire's early-season games in May 1935, but took no wickets: indeed, he came in for some fearful punishment in the opener against Sussex, recording an unattractive first-innings analysis of 17-2-101-0 in a game Worcestershire were to lose by an innings. His final first-class match was against Lancashire later that month, where he bowled just seven overs without reward.

Harrison was born in Droitwich, Worcestershire; he died in the same town at the age of 82.
