= Gabriel Pippet =

Gabriel Pippet (1880 in Solihull – 1962) was a British artist.

As well as being was an artist, he was known as an illustrator and a wood carver. Pippet's work was influenced by Pre-Raphaelites, the Arts and Crafts Movement, and medieval manuscript design. Pippet is buried in Droitwich next to the Church of the Sacred Heart, whose mosaics he designed.

== Work ==
Gabriel Pippet's art and designs decorated several churches and chapels in its various forms. Amongst these are:

- the Oxford Oratory, Oxford, where Pippet's designs decorated Sacred Heart Chapel (before 1907) and the Relic Chapel
- St Mary's Church, Douai Abbey, Berkshire, scenes from the life of St Benedict as recorded in St Gregory's Dialogues (1913)
- The Church of the Sacred Heart and St Catherine of Alexandria, Droitwich, where Pippet designed the images to be depicted in mosaics by Maurice Josey (1922-1934). Pippet also created wood and stone carvings for the church.

At one point Pippet lived at Hare Street House the home of Monsignor Robert Hugh Benson, and he and Pippet worked together on wood carving and panelling. Pippet used wood-cuts to illustrate Benson's books.

== Bibliography (Illustrated by Gabriel Pippet) ==
- A Child's Rule of Life by Robert Hugh Benson, digitized by Richard Mammana
- Old Testament Rhymes by Robert Hugh Benson
- Still More Old Rhymes with New Tunes by Richard Runciman Terry
- Traffic and Theatre Rhymes by Guy Boas.
- Fifteen Roses: Being Our Lady's Rosary in Verse by Hamilton Moore.
- The Stations of the Cross by Richard Rolle, 1917.
- The Imitation of Christ,Thomas à Kempis
