= Maurice Richard Josey =

Maurice Josey at Droitwich. More than 8 tons of glass was imported from Venice.

Maurice Richard Josey (30 October 1870 – 6 May 1938) was an English mosaic artist.

== Life and work ==
Josey was born at 1 Langton Cottages, Melbourne Square, Kennington, London in 1870, son of the renowned mezzotint engraver Richard Josey and Elizabeth Croxon.

The third of fourteen children, Josey was raised and lived in Shepherd's Bush, London. As a youth, he played football for St Jude's Institute, which later merged to become Queens Park Rangers FC. He grew up in an artistic atmosphere, his father Richard Josey (1840–1906), a printmaker, took commissions from various artists of the day and many paintings came into the Josey household including Whistler's Mother when he was 8. By the age of 11, Maurice, along with his brothers John and Thomas, was a student of fine art. He and Tom worked under their father as mezzotint engravers, and though Maurice became a very capable artist in water colours and oils it was through the medium of mosaic that he made his name and career.

In 1893 Josey married Emily Jane Hatton (c.1864-1961), daughter of John Joseph Hatton, coal merchant, boat builder and former Worshipful Master of Berkhamsted. The Joseys had 2 sons and 5 daughters.

His most notable work was the mosaics at The Church of the Sacred Heart and St Catherine of Alexandria in Droitwich, Worcestershire. The designs, conceived by the artist Gabriel Pippet, were begun in 1921 and executed by Josey, taking 12 years to complete. Eight and a half tons of quarter-inch glass was imported from Venice for the purpose.

Christ above the altar, Droitwich

Josey was assisted in the task by a boy, Fred Oates, who grew to manhood during the completion of the mosaics. Josey studied the Roman style mosaics at Ravenna in Italy prior to undertaking the Droitwich commission. The mosaics are remarkable in that they cover almost the entirety of the church. Berrow's Worcester Journal featured an article on the as yet incomplete mosaics in a 1930 supplement, stating that the church would become the only one in the world with an interior completely decorated in this manner. Josey died a few years after completing his work at Droitwich and was buried in London. After his death, a further commission was undertaken to decorate a small side chapel at Droitwich by Thomas Algernon Josey, Maurice's younger brother.

Josey's mosaic work can be seen in both Westminster Cathedral and at St Paul's Cathedral, London, where he completed the faces in the mosaics, working under Sir William Richmond R.A. Josey also did mosaics at Billingham, at the Fitzrovia Chapel which was the old Middlesex Hospital Chapel and Baptistry and at a churches in Smethwick and Birmingham and also in a convent near Saltash, Cornwall.
