= List of county days in the United Kingdom =

County days in the United Kingdom are relatively recent observances, formed to celebrate the cultural heritage of a particular British county. County days may be selected to coincide with the observance of a Saint's Day that has local significance.

County	Date	First observed	Origin
Bedfordshire	28 November	2015	Date decided by a public vote organised by The Friends of Bedfordshire society
Black Country Day	14 July	2012	Date chosen as it is considered to be the date of the inception of the Newcomen engine, the first commercially successful engine.
Buckinghamshire	29 July	2015	Date selected to remember the founding of the Paralympic Movement at Stoke Mandeville Hospital, near Aylesbury.
Cheshire	30 March	2021	Commemorates the reissuance of Magna Carta of Chester in 1215.
Cornwall (St Piran's Day)	5 March	c. 1900	Previously a local holiday, revived as part of Cornish nationalism movement
Cumberland	24 September	2013	Marks the baptism of John Peel, a renowned local huntsmen born near Caldbeck
Devon	4 June	Traditional	Saint Petroc's Day
Dorset	1 June	Traditional	The feast day of St Wite.
Durham	20 March	Traditional	The feast day of St Cuthbert.
Essex	26 October		St Cedd's Day
Hampshire	15 July	2019	The feast day of St Swithun. Designated by Hampshire County Council
Huntingdonshire	25 April	2002	Huntingdonshire Society
Kent	26 May	Traditional	The feast day of Augustine of Canterbury, first Archbishop of Canterbury
Lancashire	27 November	1996	Friends of Real Lancashire
Lincolnshire (Lincolnshire Day)	1 October	2006	Commemorates the Lincolnshire Rising of 1536
Middlesex	16 May	c. 2003	John Randall originated early day motion
Norfolk	27 July	2018	A project between BBC Radio Norfolk and the Eastern Daily Press (EDP).
Northamptonshire	25 October	2014	The feast day of Saints Crispin and Crispinian, the patron saints of cobblers, date decided by a public vote
Northumberland	Last Sunday in May	2017	Northumberland Day has two county days. One is on the last Sunday of May every year to coincide with the Spring Bank Holiday. The other on the 5th August and is traditionally recognised by the Historic Counties Trust, the feast of St Oswald. 1 A privately run day originally started by Catapult PR and Langley Castle Hotel, after consultation with a variety of key stakeholders and businesses. It is now run by Catapult PR and The County Day Company. Northumberland Day in 2020 has become the first 'virtual' county day.
Nottinghamshire	25 August	2021	Anniversary of the start of the English Civil War, an event triggered by Charles I raising the royal standard at Nottingham Castle in 1642.
Orkney	16 April	Traditional	The feast day of Saint Magnus
Oxfordshire (Oxfordshire Day)	19 October	?	Also called Saint Frideswide's Day.
Shetland	21 June	Traditional	Celebrated in the Shetland Isles annually.
Shropshire	23 February	Traditional	The feast day of St Milburga, the abbess of Wenlock Priory, Shropshire.
Staffordshire	1 May	2016	Date decided by a public vote organised by Destination Staffordshire
Suffolk	21 June	2017	
Sussex (Sussex Day, also known as St Richard's Day)	16 June	2007	The feast day of St Richard of Chichester, Sussex's patron saint Recognised by county councils of East and West Sussex
Wiltshire	5 June	2007	The date the 'Bustard flag' was first flown over County Hall, Trowbridge.
Yorkshire (Yorkshire Day)	1 August	1975	Yorkshire Ridings Society

The Association of British Counties has proposed the 23rd of April as county day for Warwickshire. The date was chosen as the birthday (and date of death) of William Shakespeare.

Proposals exist for various days in Somerset.

There is also a proposal to make the 29th of July Buckinghamshire Day. This date was chosen because of its importance to the founding of the Paralympic Games movement. The games grew from events held at Stoke Mandeville hospital in Buckinghamshire for British World War II veterans with spinal cord injuries. The Memorial Mob, a Bucks-based group which creates Memorials to Lost & Forgotten events of the Armed & Emergency Services, felt it was appropriate to honour Buckinghamshire.
