= Yorkshire Day =

Annual celebration of the historic English county of Yorkshire

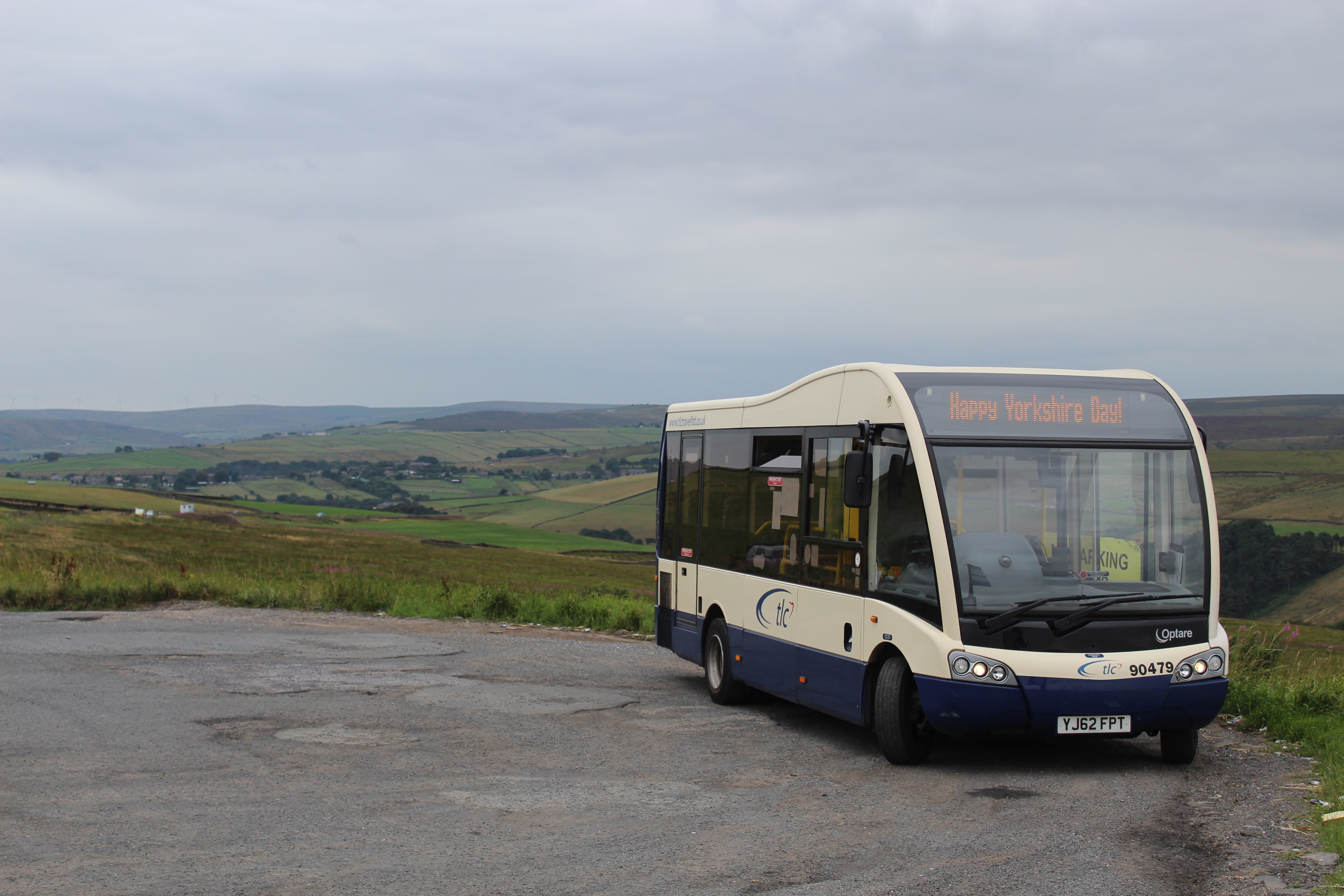
- A TLC Travel bus displaying "Happy Yorkshire Day!" on the destination blind, Yorkshire Day in 2018.
- Observed by: Residents of Yorkshire
- Significance: Anniversaries of the Battle of Minden and the Abolition of Slavery
- Celebrations: Celebration and promotion of Yorkshire culture
- Date: 1 August
- Next time: 1 August 2027
- Frequency: annual
- Related to: Lincolnshire Day; Minden Day; Oxfordshire Day; St Piran's Day; Suffolk Day; Sussex Day

Yorkshire Day is a yearly celebration on 1 August to promote the historic county of Yorkshire, in England. It was celebrated by the Yorkshire Ridings Society in 1975, initially in Beverley, as "a protest movement against the local government re-organisation of 1974".

The date in part memorialises the commencement of the 1833 Slavery Abolition Act, on the 1 August 1834. William Wilberforce, member of parliament (MP) for Yorkshire, had been instrumental in campaigning for emancipation, alongside other prominent Yorkshire abolitionists including Wilson Armistead and Richard Oastler.

The day was already celebrated by the Light Infantry, successors to the King's Own Yorkshire Light Infantry, as Minden Day, after the battle of Minden. Together with five other infantry regiments of the British Army, a rose is permitted to be worn in the headdress. In the case of the Light Infantry, the rose is white.

== Yorkshire Society ==
The event was first celebrated officially in 1985, when council authorities agreed to host a joint civic celebration in York. Attended by lord mayors, mayors, and other civic heads, this has been repeated annually with the location moving each year. It is convened by the Yorkshire Society.

- 1985: York
- 1986: Ripon
- 1987: Wakefield
- 1988: Wakefield
- 1989: Whitby
- 1990: Skipton
- 1991: Rotherham
- 1992: Richmond
- 1993: Leeds
- 1994: Doncaster
- 1995: Barnsley
- 1996: Todmorden
- 1997: Bradford
- 1998: Huddersfield
- 1999: Kingston upon Hull
- 2000: York
- 2001: Wakefield
- 2002: Filey
- 2003: Halifax
- 2004: Leeds
- 2005: Bradford
- 2006: Penistone
- 2007: Kingston upon Hull
- 2008: Redcar
- 2009: Malton
- 2010: Hedon
- 2011: Wakefield
- 2012: Scarborough
- 2013: Skipton
- 2014: South Kirkby and Moorthorpe
- 2015: Doncaster
- 2016: Halifax
- 2017: Sheffield
- 2018: Ripon
- 2019: Whitby
- 2022: Keighley
- 2023: Rotherham
- 2024: York
- 2025: Bradford and Ilkley
- 2026: Goole

Saltburn, Guisborough and Saddleworth have also played host. Due to COVID-19 restrictions, celebrations were cancelled in 2020 and in 2021 York held on-line events.

Similar events have been promoted by the Friends of Real Lancashire (27 November, since 1996) and the Huntingdonshire Society (25 April, since 2002) to promote their counties.

On Yorkshire Day, members of the society read a "Declaration of Integrity":

"I, [Name], being a resident of the [West/North/East] Riding of Yorkshire [or City of York] declare:

That Yorkshire is three Ridings and the City of York, with these Boundaries of [Current Year minus 875, so for 2026, 1151] (Note: Thus, in 2013 it was "1,138 years' standing", in 2014 it was "1,139 years' standing", in 2015 it was "1,140 years' standing", and so on.) years' standing; That the address of all places in these Ridings is Yorkshire; That all persons born therein or resident therein and loyal to the Ridings are Yorkshiremen and women; That any person or corporate body which deliberately ignores or denies the aforementioned shall forfeit all claim to Yorkshire status.

These declarations made this Yorkshire Day [Year]. God Save the King!"

In York the Declaration is made four times by the Yorkshire Ridings Society, once for each Riding and once for the City of York. The traditional boundaries of the Three Ridings run up to the ancient city walls, so by processing out of three of the bars (gatehouses) the Society can make the Declaration in each Riding, followed by reading the Declaration within a fourth bar inside the city.

== Critical reaction ==
The day has attracted some criticism:

Despite the serious underlying purpose and money-raising activities for charity, some Yorkshire people worry that it has become a media and marketing jamboree, perpetuating stereotypes of whippets, black puddings and flat caps. "We have to be careful not to overdo it, but regional distinctiveness adds colour. I'm against a grey uniformity spreading over everything, which is the way the world is going," says Arnold Kellett from the Yorkshire Dialect Society.

In its early years, the day was not widely acknowledged. A 1991 Times editorial read:

Today is Yorkshire Day. Not many people know that, as a very non-Yorkshire person likes to say, and probably not many Yorkshiremen either know or care. It is almost as artificial as Father's Day, which, as all thrifty northerners know, was created to sell more greetings cards

— The Times

== Influences ==
=== Suffolk Day ===
Yorkshire Day was instrumental in the creation of Suffolk Day. It was created by Mark Murphy whilst he was a presenter at BBC Radio Suffolk, who noted that Carol Kirkwood made special mention of Yorkshire on 1 August:

One day, Carol was delivering the weather forecast with an unusual emphasis on Yorkshire.

On closer examination, I looked at the subtitles and it said Yorkshire Day.

So, my producers found someone to come on air and talk about it.

It was during the conversation I thought, how come Yorkshire has a day and Suffolk doesn’t?

I floated the idea on air, and it was met with a resounding let's do it!

— Mark Murphy, How Carol Kirkwood inspired Suffolk Day

== See also ==
- Lancashire Day
- St Piran's Day
- Sussex Day
