= History of Sussex =

Sussex
- Flag of Sussex

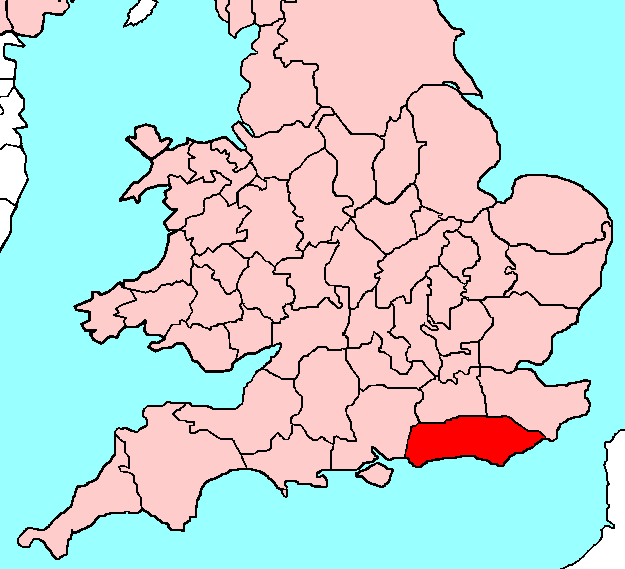
- Ancient extent of Sussex
- Area
  - 1831: 907,920 acres (3,674 km^{2})
  - 1901: 932,409 acres (3,773 km^{2})
- Population
  - 1831: 272,340
  - 1901: 602,255
- Density
  - 1831: 0.3 per acre (74/km^{2})
  - 1901: 0.6 per acre (150/km^{2})
- History
  - Origin: Kingdom of Sussex
  - Created: In antiquity
  - Succeeded by: East Sussex and West Sussex
- Status: Ceremonial county (until 1974)
- Chapman code: SSX
- Government
  - HQ: Chichester or Lewes
  - Motto: We wunt be druv

Sussex /ˈsʌsɪks/, from the Old English 'Sūþseaxe' ('South Saxons'), is a historic county in South East England.

Evidence from a fossil of Boxgrove Man (Homo heidelbergensis) shows that Sussex has been inhabited for at least 500,000 years. It is thought to be the oldest human fossil ever discovered in Britain.

Near Pulborough, tools have been found that date from around 35,000 years ago and that are thought to be from either the last Neanderthals in northern Europe or pioneer populations of modern humans. On the South Downs lie Neolithic flint mines that date to around 4000BC, some of the earliest in Europe. The county is also rich in remains from the Bronze Age and Iron Age.

Prior to Roman invasions it was occupied by a Belgic tribe called the Atrebates. Togidubnus ruled over much of Sussex when the Roman conquest of Britain began and formed most of the Roman canton of the Regni.

The retreat of Roman forces in the 5th century facilitated the landing of migrants from what is now Germany and created the kingdom of the South Saxons under King Ælle, who is recorded as having held overlordship over other Anglo-Saxon kingdoms and as being the first bretwalda, or 'Britain ruler'. Under St Wilfrid, Sussex became the last of the seven traditional kingdoms of the heptarchy to undergo Christianisation. By the 8th century the kingdom had expanded to include the territory of the Haestingas. Around 827 in the aftermath of the battle of Ellandun, Sussex was annexed by the kingdom of Wessex, a kingdom that with further expansion became the kingdom of England.

In 1066 Norman forces arrived in Sussex, the heartland of King Harold Godwinson. Defeating Harold at the Battle of Hastings, William the Conqueror established five (later six) semi-independent territories known as rapes within Sussex. The South Saxon see was transferred from Selsey Abbey to a new cathedral in the city of Chichester. Castles were built, many the subject of sieges in the High Middle Ages. Sussex was of strategic importance on the most direct route between Angevin lands in England and Normandy. Many Sussex ports, including the Cinque Ports, provided ships for military use.

A succession crisis in the kingdom of France led to the Hundred Years War in which Sussex found itself on the frontline. Various rebellions followed in the late medieval period, including the Peasants’ Revolt, Jack Cade's rebellion and the rebellion of the Merfold brothers.

Under Henry VIII, the church in England split from Roman Catholicism. Mary I returned England to Catholicism and in Sussex 41 Protestants were burned to death. Under Elizabeth intolerance continued on a lesser scale as many Catholics in Sussex died at this time. In Elizabeth's reign, Sussex was open to the older Protestant forms practised in the Weald as well as the newer Protestant forms coming from Continental Europe; combined with a significant Catholic presence, Sussex was in many ways out of step with the rest of southern England. Sussex escaped most of the ravages of the Civil War with two sieges and one battle.

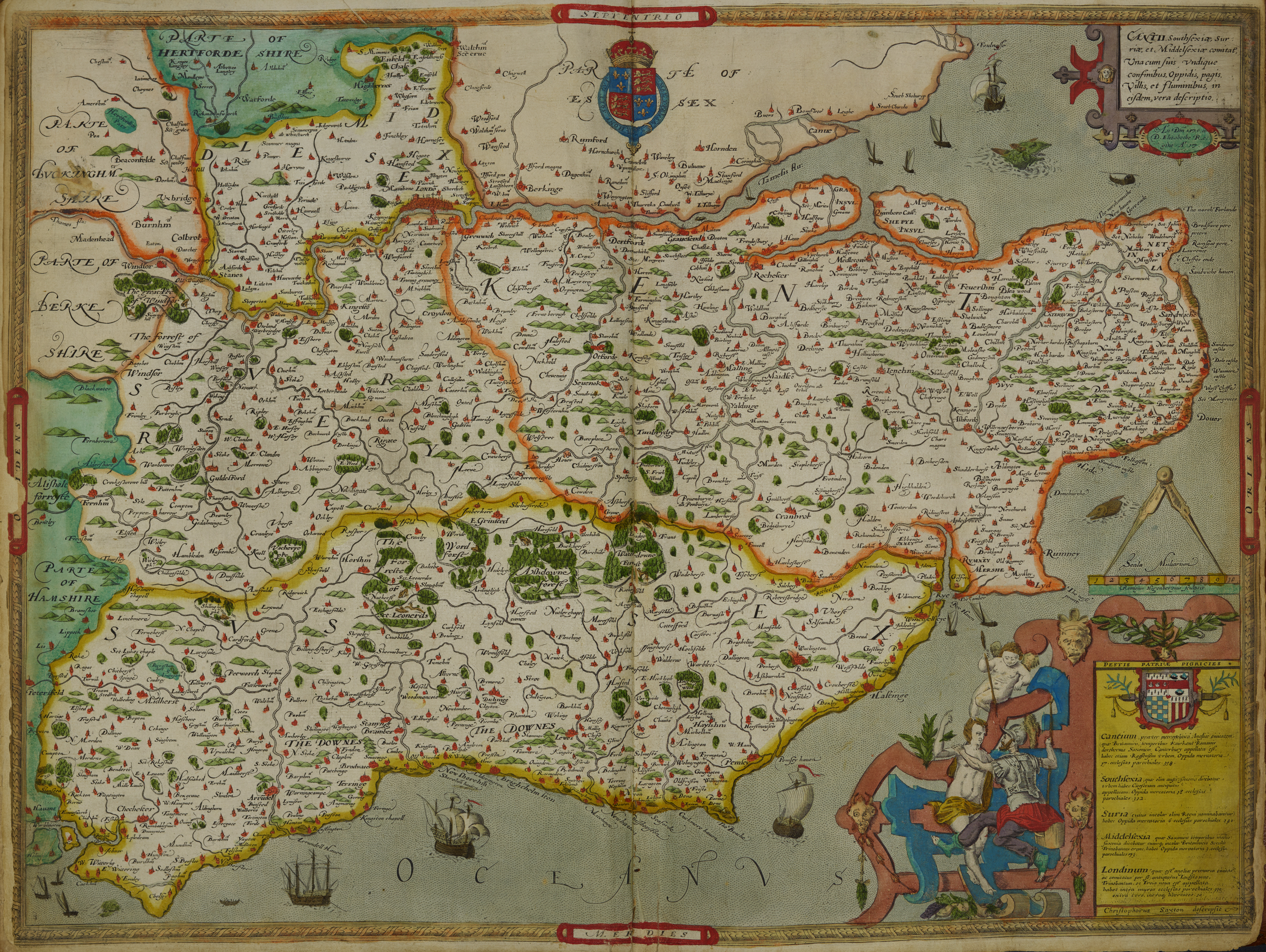
Hand-drawn map of Kent, Sussex, Surrey and Middlesex by Christopher Saxton from 1575

As the Industrial Revolution took hold, the Wealden iron industry collapsed. The growth of the seaside resorts in the 18th century was especially significant in Sussex. Sussex men played a significant role in the first world war Battle of the Boar's Head. At the war's end terms of the Armistice were agreed at Danny House. In World War Two the county was a base for the Dieppe Raid and D-Day landings.

In 1974, the Lord-Lieutenant of Sussex was replaced with one each for East and West Sussex, which became separate ceremonial counties. In the 21st century a county day and a county flag were created for Sussex and a National Park was established for the South Downs.

== Prehistoric Sussex ==
=== Stone Age ===
In 1993 a human-like tibia was found at Boxgrove near Chichester. Then in 1996 further hominid remains were found: two incisor teeth from a single individual recovered from the lower freshwater deposits at the site. The remains came to be known as "Boxgrove man" and are thought to be a species known as Homo heidelbergensis. Boxgrove man apparently lived in a temperate stage immediately prior to the Anglian glaciation, in the Lower Palaeolithic period between 524,000 and 478,000 years ago.

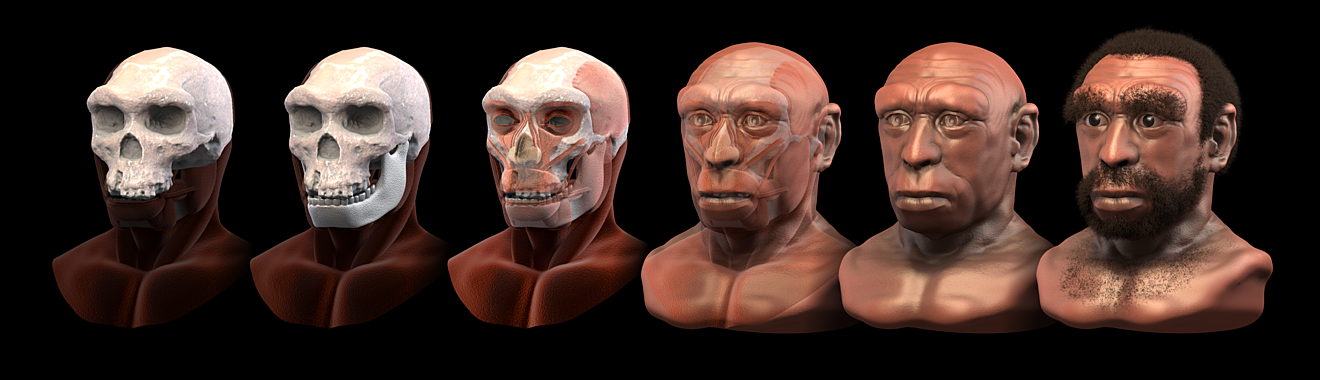
Reconstruction of Homo heidelbergensis.

In 1900 Upper Palaeolithic flintwork was found at a site in the Beedings. Then in 2007–08 Early Upper Palaeolithic archaeology was found at the same site. The archaeology at the Beedings spans a crucial cultural transition in the European Palaeolithic and therefore provides an important new dataset for the analysis of late Neanderthal groups in northern Europe and their replacement by modern human populations.

It is believed that during the Mesolithic Age nomadic hunters arrived in Sussex from Europe. At the time (8000 BC), Britain was still connected to the continent, however the ice sheets over northern Europe were melting rapidly and causing the gradual rising of sea levels, which eventually led to the forming of the Straits of Dover, effectively cutting off the Mesolithic people of Sussex from the continent. There have been archaeological finds from these people, mostly in the central wealden area to the north of the Downs. Large amounts of knives, scrapers, arrow heads and other tools have been found.

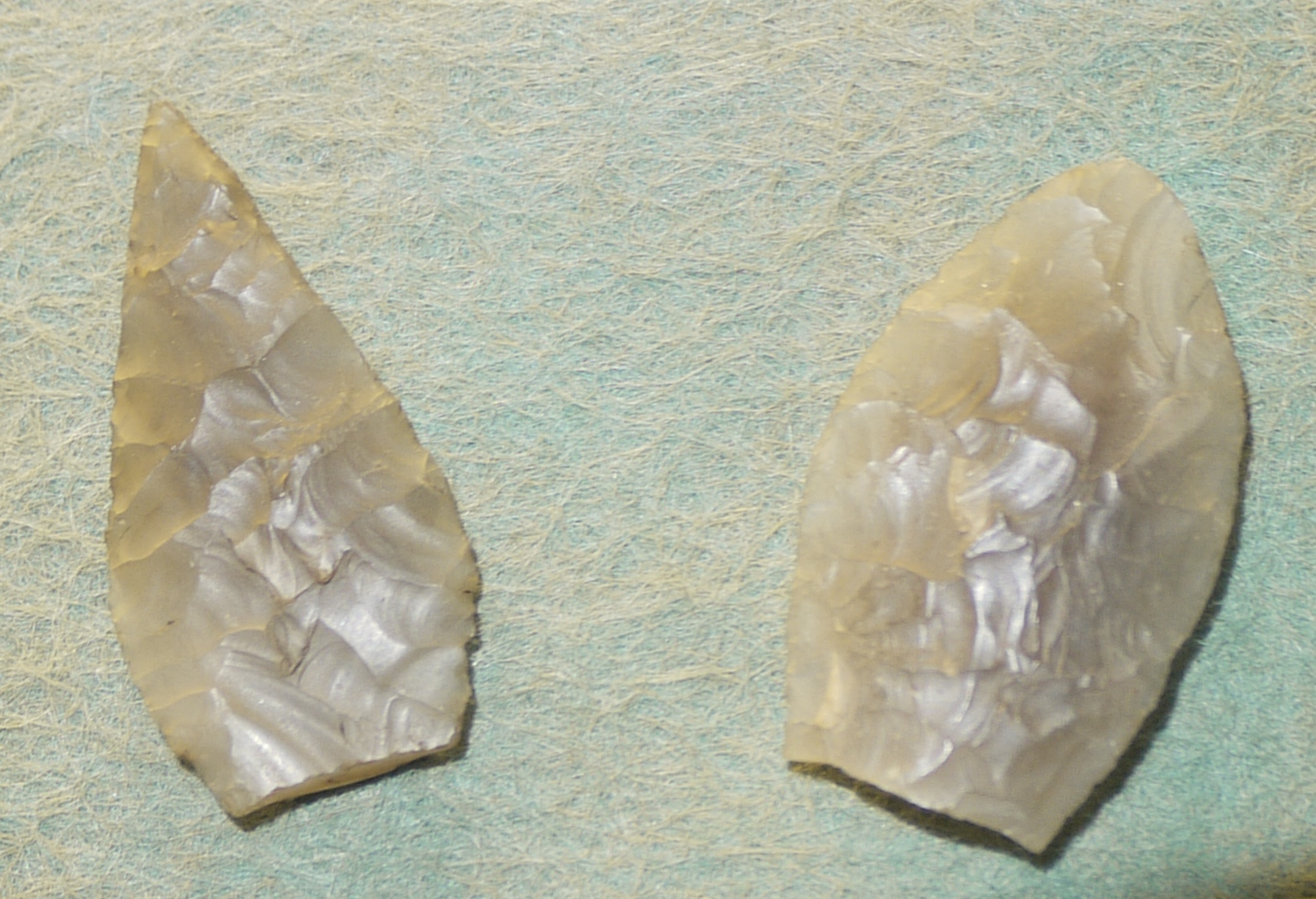
Neolithic flint arrowheads found near Selsey

Close to the River Ouse near Sharpsbridge, a polished axe, polished axe fragments, a chisel and other examples of Neolithic flintwork have been found. The fact that these implements were found close to the River Ouse suggests that some land clearance may have taken place in the river valley during the Neolithic period.

From about 4300 BC to about 3400 BC the mining of flint for use locally and also for wider trade was a major activity in Neolithic Sussex. There was also a Neolithic pottery industry, with styles of pot reminiscent of finds elsewhere, such as Hembury and Grimston/Lyle Hill.

=== Bronze Age ===
From the Bronze Age (about 1400-1100BC) settlements and burial sites have left their mark throughout Sussex. The transition from the late neolithic to the Early Bronze Age in Sussex is marked by the appearance of Beaker pottery. There have been several finds including some in Beaker settlements; a significant settlement was one discovered near Beachy Head in 1909. The site was partially excavated in 1970 and the finds included pottery, flints, post settings, shallow pits and a midden.

The presence of Beaker pottery provides the first evidence of the migration of people from northern Europe since the early Neolithic period. In the 1980s some pre-historians doubted the existence of the Beaker people as migrants and suggest that it was possible that the Beaker culture may have just been a new development of the local neolithic people. However more recently, the analysis of ancient human DNA, has enabled scientists to establish that the British Beaker populations were in fact more closely related to those originating from central Europe and that the presence of Beaker people in Britain was just part of the continuing east-to-west expansion that had brought Steppe-related ancestry into central and northern Europe.

=== Iron Age ===
There are over fifty Iron Age sites that are known throughout the Sussex Downs. Probably the best known are the hill-forts such as Cissbury Ring. A small number of agricultural settlements, or farmsteads, have been excavated on a large scale.

The results of these excavations have provided a picture of the economy, based on mixed farming. Artefacts such as iron ploughshares and sickles were excavated. The presence of animal bones, particularly cattle and sheep, attests to the pastoral element to their economy. Various items have been found that indicate that they used to spin and weave the wool they produced. The Sussex Iron Age dwellers supplemented their diet with marine shellfish, the remains of which have been found on several sites.

Towards the end of the Iron Age in 75BC, people from the Atrebates, one of the tribes of the Belgae, a mix of Celtic and German stock, started invading and occupying southern Britain. This was followed by an invasion by the Roman army under Julius Caesar that temporarily occupied the south-east in 55BC. Then, soon after the first Roman invasion had ended, the Celtic Regni tribe under their leader Commius occupied the Manhood Peninsula.

Tincomarus and then Cogidubnus followed Commius as rulers of the Regni. At the time of the Roman conquest in AD 43 there was an oppidum in the southern part of their territory, probably in the Chichester region.

== Roman Sussex ==
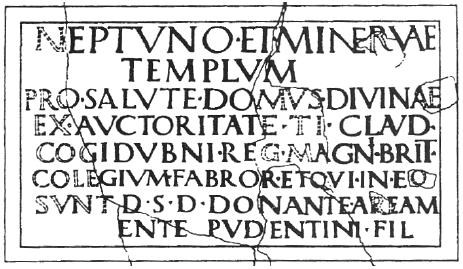
Chichester inscription, with Cogidubnus name

After the Roman invasion Cogidubnus was installed or confirmed by the Romans as ruler of the Regni and he took the name Tiberius Claudius Cogidubnus and claimed to be ‘'rex magnus Britanniae'’. His name is mentioned in two exceptionally early Roman inscriptions in his capital of Noviomagus Reginorum (Chichester).

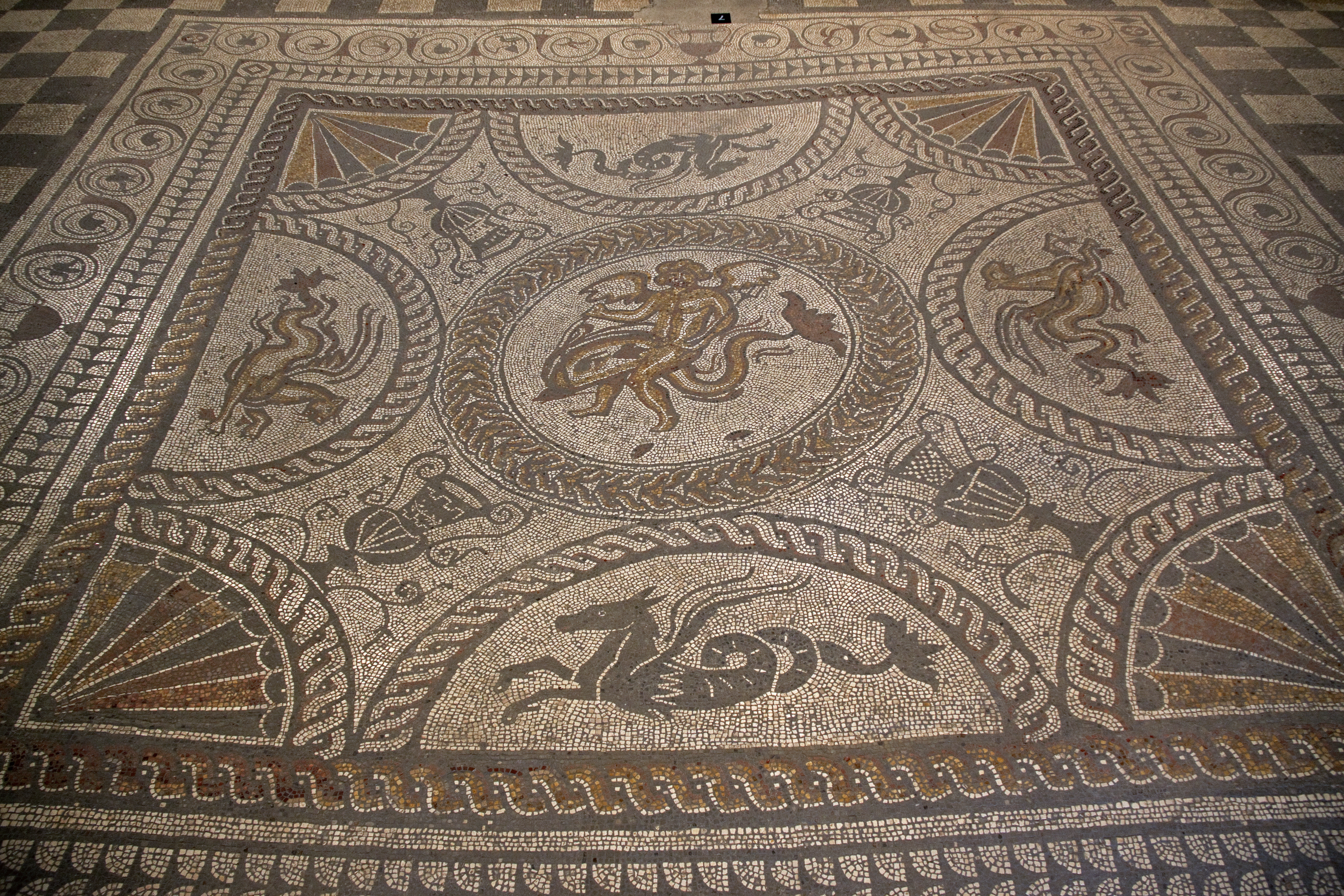
A mid-2nd century mosaic showing Cupid riding a dolphin, discovered during the excavation of Fishbourne Roman Palace.

There are a variety of remains in the county from Roman times, coin hoards and decorated pottery have been found.

There are examples of Roman roads such as:

- Chichester to Silchester Way
- Chichester to London Stane Street

Also a variety of buildings, the best known being:

- Bignor Roman Villa
- Fishbourne Roman Palace
- Anderitum (Pevensey Castle)

The coast of Roman Britain had a series of defensive forts on them, and towards the end of the Roman occupation the coast was subject to raids by Saxons. Additional forts were built against the Saxon threat, an example in Sussex being Anderitum (Pevensey Castle). The coastal defences were supervised by the Count of the Saxon Shore.

There is some suggestion that around the beginning of the fourth century the Roman authorities recruited mercenaries from the German homelands to defend the southern and eastern coasts of Britain. The area they defended was known as the Saxon Shore. It is possible that these mercenaries remained after the departure of the Roman army and merged with the eventual Anglo-Saxon invaders.

== Kingdom of Sussex ==
Map of Britain around 800 AD showing the kingdom of Sussex

The foundation of the Kingdom of Sussex is recorded by the Anglo-Saxon Chronicle for the year AD 477, saying that Ælle arrived at a place called Cymenshore in three ships with his three sons and killed or put to flight the local inhabitants.

The foundation story is regarded as somewhat of a myth by most historians, although the archaeology suggests that Saxons did start to settle in the area in the late 5th century. The Kingdom of Sussex became the county of Sussex; then, after the coming of Christianity, the see founded in Selsey was moved to Chichester in the 11th century. The See of Chichester was coterminous with the county borders. In the 12th century the see was split into two archdeaconries centred at Chichester and Lewes.

Having fought on the banks of the Mearcredesburna, it seems Ælle secured the area between the Ouse and Cuckmere in a treaty. After Ælle's forces seized the Saxon Shore fort of Anderida, the South Saxons were able to gradually colonise free of Romano-British control and extend their territory westwards to link with the Saxon settlement at Highdown Hill. Ælle was recognised as the first 'Bretwalda' or overlord of southern Britain.

It has been conjectured that, as Saxon war leader, Ælle may have met his death in the disastrous battle of Mount Badon, where the Britons halted Saxon expansion. The Britons were thought to have been led by Ambrosius Aurelianus, although there is no evidence for him being present at the battle.

For much of the 7th and 8th centuries, Sussex was engaged in conflict with the kingdom of Wessex to its west. King Æðelwealh formed an alliance with Christian Mercia against Wessex, becoming Sussex's first Christian king. With support from St Wilfrid, Sussex became the last major Anglo Saxon kingdom to become Christian. South Saxon and Mercian forces took control of what is now east Hampshire and the Isle of Wight.

In about 685 Eadric of Kent revolted against his uncle (Hlothhere of Kent) (Note: There is suggestion that Eadric, before the revolt, had jointly ruled with his uncle Hlothhere, although there is no certain evidence for it.) and with help from Æðelwealh raised a South Saxon army that defeated Hlothhere in battle. Eadric then became sole ruler of Kent.

Also in 685, a warband led by the West Saxon prince Cædwalla killed Æðelwealh and "ravaged Sussex by fierce slaughter and devastation". Cædwalla was subsequently driven out of Sussex by two of Æðelwealh's ealdormen, Berhthun and Andhun. William of Malmesbury suggests that Eadric became king of the South Saxon kingdom at that time. It is also possible that Sussex could have re-emerged as a regional power. When Cædwalla eventually became king of Wessex, he returned to Sussex, killing its king and oppressing its people, putting them in what Bede called "a worse state of slavery".

[Cædwalla's] hatred and hostility towards the South Saxons were inextinguishable, and he totally destroyed Edric [Eadric] the successor of Ethelwalch [Æðelwealh] who opposed him with renovated boldness:....he also gained repeated victories over the people of Kent..

— William of Malmesbury 1847, pp. 30–31

After the departure of Wilfrid, the South Saxon Diocese was absorbed by the Diocese of the West Saxons, at Winchester. However, by AD 705 the West Saxon Diocese had grown to such a size that it became unwieldy to manage, so Ine of Wessex, Cædwalla's successor, resolved with his witan to divide the great diocese. Accordingly, a new see was created at Sherborne and four years later the See of South Saxons was reinstated.

Following a period of rule by King Offa of Mercia, Sussex regained its independence but was annexed by Wessex around 827. In 860, following the death of Æthelbald king of Wessex, Sussex was fully absorbed into the realm of Wessex.

== Late Saxon Sussex ==
Viking raids took place on Sussex in the following years. According to the Anglo-Saxon Chronicle, in 895 the people of Chichester fought off a large force of raiders, slaying many hundreds of them, and took some of their ships. After the Battle of Edington, in Wessex, Alfred the Great constructed an integrated network of fortifications and defence with a system of fortresses, known as burhs, at its centre. Alfred was able to make it difficult for the Vikings to seize strategically important towns and ports. In Sussex burhs were built at Chichester, Burpham, Lewes, Hastings and Eorpeburnan.

Burhs also had secondary roles as economic centres, safe havens in which trade and production could take place. Some of the burhs became the administrative centres of their districts, headed by thegns, or chieftains. The fortifications seem to have protected Sussex well from attack.

By the ninth century, of the many Anglo-Saxon kingdoms, only four remained, namely Wessex, Mercia, Northumbria and East Anglia. Of those four kingdoms, Wessex became dominant and eventually, by Æthelstan's reign (927 to 939), had absorbed the other kingdoms into the one Kingdom of England.

During the reign of Æthelred the Unready there was renewed conflict with the Danes. In 998 the Vikings established a base on the Isle of Wight from which they could launch attacks and in 1000 the Anglo-Saxon Chronicle reported that "everywhere in Sussex they plundered and burnt as is their custom".

After the Danish king Cnut the Great took the English throne in 1016, there was a brief flowering of Saxon culture in Sussex, as peace returned. Churches were built and wall paintings were created across Sussex, including at Bosham, Sompting, Worth, Jevington, Sullington and Clayton.

Under Cnut's kingship, Godwin, Earl of Wessex rose to prominence. A son of Wulfnoth Cild, a South Saxon thegn, Godwin was also popular in Sussex. When Godwin refused an order from Edward the Confessor to punish the people of Dover following a violent clash between the people of Dover and Eustace II, Count of Boulogne, King Edward sent Godwin and his family into exile. On his return from exile in 1052 Godwin received a hero's welcome in Sussex. After Cnut's death, Godwin's daughter, Edith married Edward the Confessor and Godwin's son Harold became the last Saxon king of England. Godwin and Harold used Bosham and Pevensey as naval bases from which they protected the coast from pirate raids.

Norman influence was already strong in Sussex before the Conquest: the abbey of Fécamp had interest in the harbours of Hastings, Rye, Winchelsea and Steyning; while the estate of Bosham was held by a Norman chaplain to Edward the Confessor.

== Norman Sussex ==
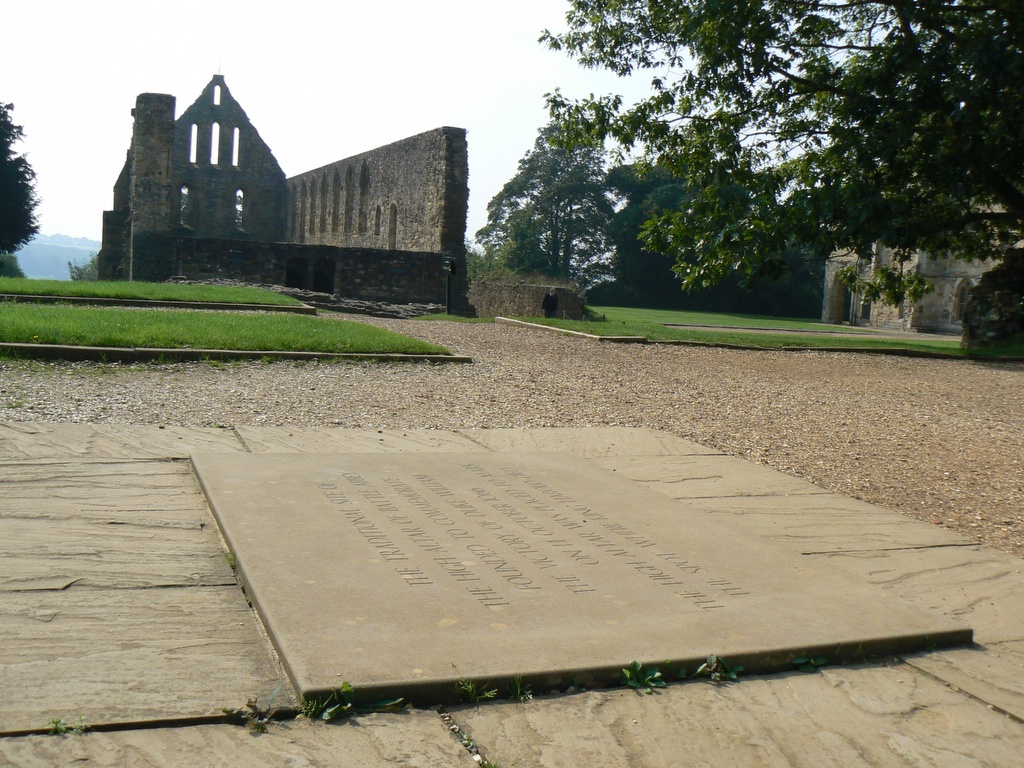
The traditional site of the High Altar of Battle Abbey founded to commemorate the victory of Duke William on 14 October 1066. The high altar was placed to mark the spot where King Harold died

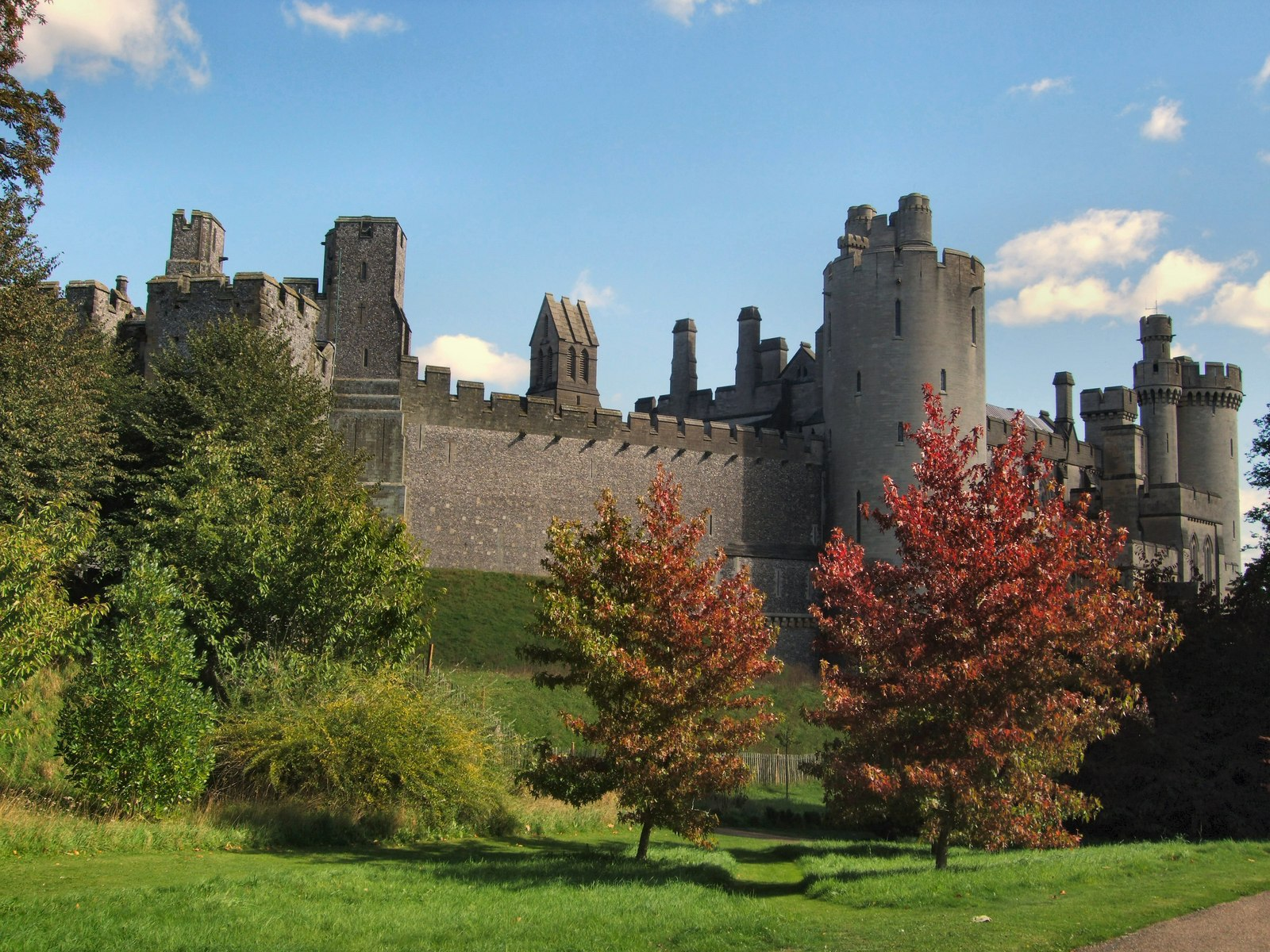
Arundel castle founded by Roger de Montgomery in 1067

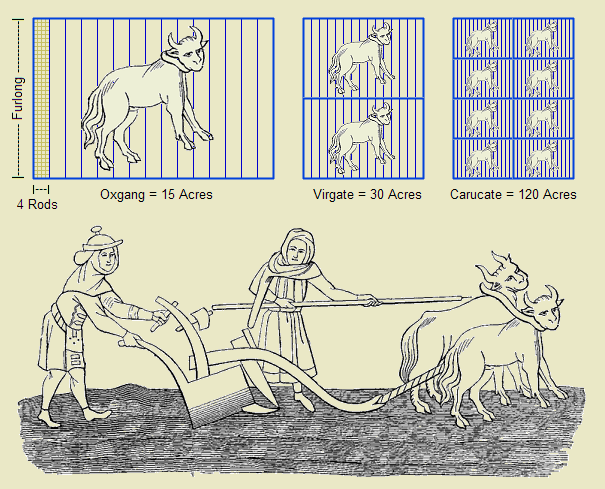
Division of farm land

On Friday, 13 October 1066, Harold Godwinson and his English army arrived at Senlac Hill, just outside Hastings, to face William of Normandy and his invading army. On 14 October 1066, during the ensuing battle, Harold was killed and the English defeated. It is likely that all the fighting men of Sussex were at the battle, as the county's thegns were decimated and any that survived had their lands confiscated. The Normans buried their dead in mass graves. There were reports that the bones of some of the English dead were still being found on the hillside some years later.

Harold held troops in key strategic locations, such as Hastings, Pevensey and Bosham. Bosham was probably Harold's military headquarters, close to his naval headquarters on the Isle of Wight, and from where he could send messages to London.

William built Battle Abbey at the site of the battle of Hastings, and the exact spot where Harold fell was marked by the high altar. After the Norman conquest the 387 manors that had been in Saxon hands were replaced by just 16 heads of manors.

	The owners of Sussex post 1066	Number of manors
1	William I	2
2	Lanfranc, Archbishop of Canterbury	8
3	Stigand, Bishop of Selsey^{*}	9
4	Gilbert, Abbot of Westminster	1
5	Abbot of Fécamp	3
6	Osborn, Bishop of Exeter	4
7	Abbot of Winchester	2
8	Gauspert, Abbot of Battle	2
9	Abbot of St Edward's	1
10	Ode^{**}	1
11	Eldred^{**}	1
12	William son of Robert, Count of Eu	108
13	Robert, Count of Mortain	81
14	William de Warenne	43
15	William de Braose	38
16	Roger, Earl of Montgomery	83
	Total	387
Notes: * The See was moved from Selsey to Chichester during Stigands tenure. ** Ode and Eldred were Saxon Lords.

The 16 people, in charge of the manors, were known as the Tenentes in capite in other words the chief tenants who held their land directly from the crown. The list includes nine ecclesiasticals, although the portion of their landholding is quite small and was virtually no different from that under Edward the Confessor. Two of the lords were Englishmen, Ode (also known as Odo of Winchester), who had been a pre-Conquest treasurer, and his brother Eldred. This means that 353 of the 387 manors in Sussex would have been wrested from their Saxon owners and given to Norman Lords by William the Conqueror.

The county was of great importance to the Normans, Hastings and Pevensey being on the most direct route for Normandy. Because of this the county was divided into five new baronies, called rapes, each with at least one town and a castle. This enabled the ruling group of Normans to control the manorial revenues and thus the greater part of the county's wealth.

William the Conqueror gave these rapes to five of his most trusted Barons:

- Roger of Montgomery - the combined Rapes of Chichester and Arundel.
- William de Braose - Rape of Bramber.
- William de Warenne - Rape of Lewes
- Robert, Count of Mortain - Rape of Pevensey
- Robert, Count of Eu - Rape of Hastings

Historically the land holdings of each Saxon lord had been scattered, but now the lords' lands were determined by the borders of the rape. The unit of land, known as the hide, in Sussex had eight instead of the usual four virgates,(a virgate being equal to the amount of land two oxen can plough in a season).

The county boundary was long and somewhat indeterminate on the north, owing to the dense forest of Andredsweald. Evidence of this is seen in the Domesday Book by the survey of Worth and Lodsworth under Surrey, and also by the fact that as late as 1834 the present parishes of North and South Ambersham in Sussex were part of Hampshire.

== Sussex under the Plantagenets ==
Rye, one of the historic Cinque Ports

During the Hundred Years' War, Sussex found itself on the frontline, convenient both for intended invasions and retaliatory expeditions by licensed French pirates. Hastings, Rye and Winchelsea were all burnt during this period and all three towns became part of the Cinque Ports, a loose federation for supplying ships for the country's security. Also at this time, Amberley and Bodiam castles were built to defend the upper reaches of navigable rivers.

== Early modern Sussex ==
Like the rest of the country, Sussex felt the effects of the Church of England's split with Rome during the reign of Henry VIII. In 1538 there was a royal order for the demolition of the shrine of Saint Richard in Chichester Cathedral, with Thomas Cromwell saying that there was "a certain kind of idolatry about the shrine". In the reign of Queen Mary, 41 people in Sussex were burnt at the stake for their Protestant beliefs. Elizabeth re-established the break with Rome when she passed the 1559 Acts of Supremacy and Uniformity. Under Elizabeth I, religious intolerance continued, albeit on a lesser scale, with several people being executed for their Catholic beliefs.

Sussex escaped the worst ravages of the English Civil War, although in 1642 there were sieges at Arundel and Chichester, and a skirmish at Haywards Heath when Royalists marching towards Lewes were intercepted by local Parliamentarians. The Royalists were routed with around 200 killed or taken prisoner. Despite Sussex being under Parliamentarian control, a heavily disguised Charles II was able to evade capture on his journey through the county after the Battle of Worcester in 1651 and make his escape to France from the port of Shoreham.

== Late modern and contemporary Sussex ==
The Sussex women are very nice in their dress and in their houses. The men and boys wear smock-frocks more than they do in some counties. - William Cobbett. 1822

The Sussex coast was greatly modified by the social movement of sea bathing for health, which became fashionable among the wealthy in the second half of the 18th century. Resorts developed all along the coast, including at Brighton, Hastings, Worthing, and Bognor.

At the beginning of the 19th century, agricultural labourers' conditions took a turn for the worse with an increasing number of them becoming unemployed, while those still working faced their wages being forced down. Conditions became so bad that it was even reported to the House of Lords in 1830 that four harvest labourers (seasonal workers) had been found dead of starvation.

The deteriorating conditions of work for the agricultural labourer eventually triggered riots, first in neighbouring Kent, and then in Sussex, where they lasted for several weeks, although the unrest continued until 1832 and became known as the Swing Riots.

During World War I, on the eve of the Battle of the Somme on 30 June 1916, the Royal Sussex Regiment took part in the Battle of the Boar's Head at Richebourg-l'Avoué. Over a period of less than five hours 17 officers and 349 men were killed. Twelve sets of brothers were amongst the dead, including three from one family. A further 1,000 men were wounded or taken prisoner. The day subsequently became known as "The Day Sussex Died".

With the outbreak of World War II, Sussex found itself part of the country's frontline with its airfields playing a key role in the Battle of Britain and with its towns being some of the most frequently bombed. As the Sussex regiments served overseas, the defence of the county was undertaken by units of the Home Guard with help from the First Canadian Army. During the lead up to the D-Day landings, the people of Sussex were witness to the build-up of military personnel and materials, including the assembly of landing crafts and construction of Mulberry harbours off the county's coast.

== Governance ==
Since its creation in the fifth century, Sussex has been subject to periodic reform of its local governance. After the Reform Act 1832 Sussex was divided into the eastern division and the western division. These divisions were coterminous with the two original archdeaconries of Chichester and Lewes. (Note: There are now four Archdeaconries in the Diocese of Chichester.) In 1889, following the Local Government Act 1888, Sussex was divided into two administrative counties, East Sussex and West Sussex, using those same boundaries, together with three self-governing county boroughs, Brighton, Eastbourne and Hastings.

In the post-war era, the New Towns Act 1946 designated Crawley as the site of a new town.

In 1974, under the Local Government Act 1972, the county boundaries were revised with the mid-Sussex area of East Grinstead, Haywards Heath, Burgess Hill and Hassocks being transferred from East Sussex into West Sussex. The Gatwick area that was formerly part of Surrey was transferred to West Sussex. As part of the Local Government Act 1972, the eastern and western divisions of Sussex were made into the ceremonial counties of East and West Sussex in 1974. Boundaries were changed and a large part of the rape of Lewes was transferred from the eastern division into West Sussex, along with Gatwick Airport, which was historically part of the county of Surrey. The county boroughs were returned to the control of the two county councils but in 1997 the towns of Brighton and Hove were amalgamated as a unitary local authority and in 2000, Brighton and Hove was given city status.

Although it is administered as the two ceremonial counties of East and West Sussex, there continue to be a range of organisations that operate throughout the ancient borders of Sussex, such as the Diocese of Chichester, Sussex Police, the Sussex Archaeological Society, the Sussex History Society, and the Sussex Wildlife Trust. In 2007, Sussex Day was created to celebrate Sussex's rich culture and history. Based on the traditional emblem of Sussex, a blue shield with six gold martlets, the flag of Sussex was recognised by the Flag Institute in 2011. In 2013, Secretary of State for Communities and Local Government Eric Pickles formally recognised and acknowledged the continued existence of England's 39 historic counties, including Sussex.

== Jurisdiction ==
The system of hundreds had been introduced during the time of the Saxons. In the 7th century Sussex has been estimated to have contained 7,000 families or hides. The creation of the rapes by the Normans introduced boundaries that divided some of the hundreds (and also some of the manors) causing a certain amount of fragmentation. The Arundel Rape covered nearly all of what is now West Sussex until about 1250 when it was split into two rapes, the Arundel Rape and the Chichester Rape. Ultimately Sussex was divided into six rapes; Chichester, Arundel, Bramber, Lewes, Pevensey and Hastings.

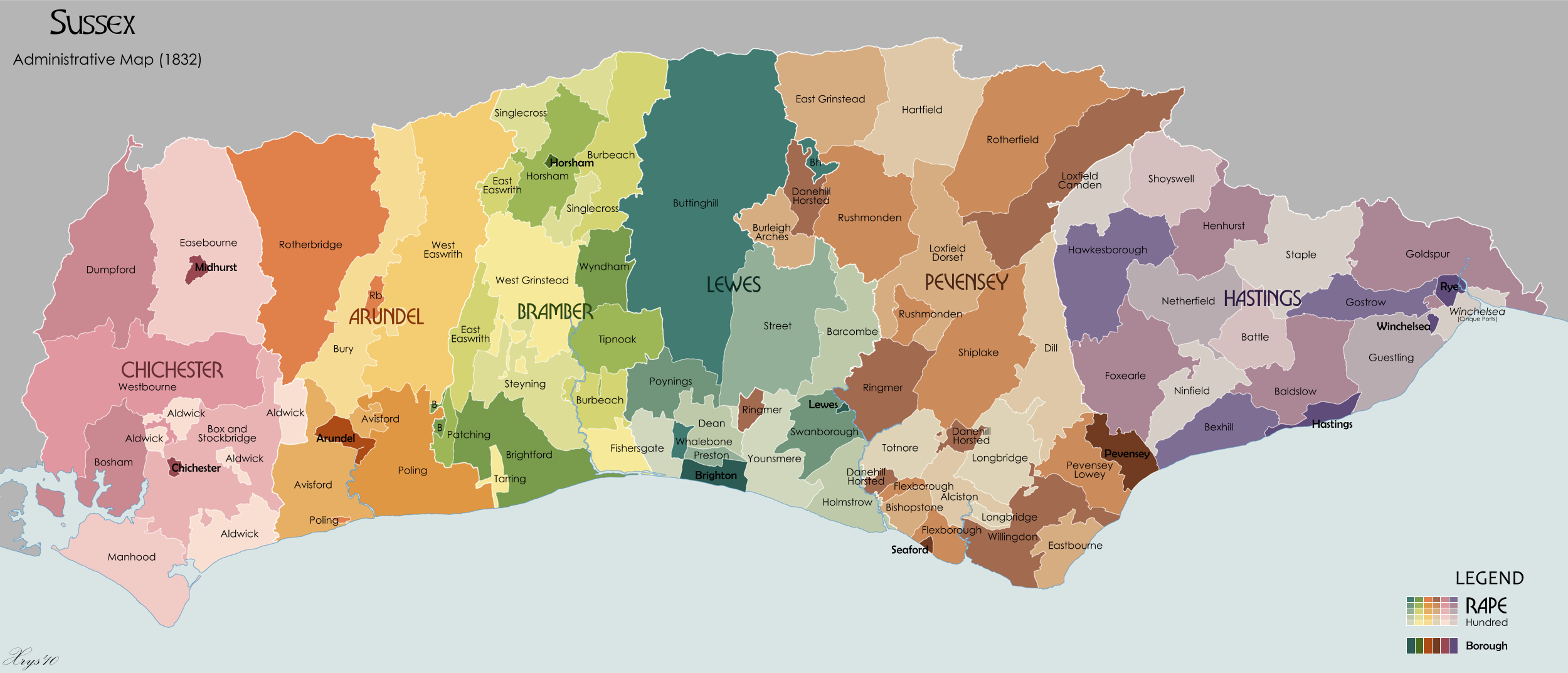
Map of Sussex in 1832. Showing the Rapes, Hundreds and Boroughs

At the time of the Domesday Survey, Sussex contained fifty nine hundreds. This eventually increased to sixty-three hundreds and remained unchanged till the 19th century, with thirty eight retaining their original names. The reason why the remainder had their names changed was probably due to the meeting-place of the hundred court being altered. These courts were in private hands in Sussex, held by either the Church or the great barons and local lords.

Independent from the hundreds were the boroughs.

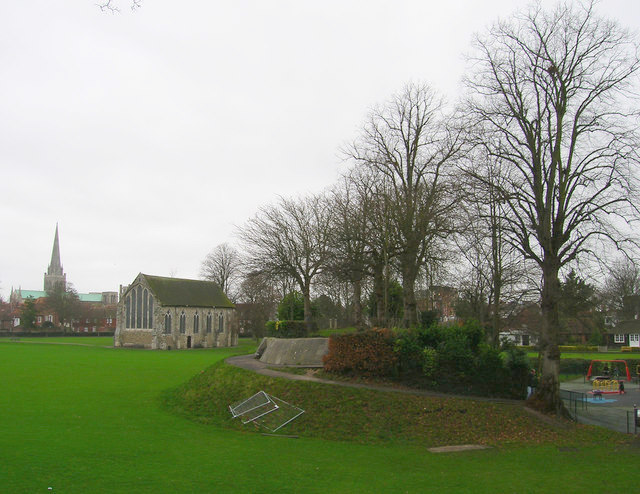
Site of Chichester Castle and Greyfriars Priory. Location of the old Chichester gaol.

Sussex Sheriff's County Court Act 1503
- Act of Parliament
- Parliament of England
- Long title: De Turnis Vic apud Cicestr & Lewes vicissim tenend.
- Citation: 19 Hen. 7. c. 24
- Territorial extent: England and Wales

Dates
- Royal assent: 25 January 1504 (Note: Start of session.)
- Commencement: 25 January 1504
- Repealed: 16 September 1887
Other legislation
Repealed by	Sheriffs Act 1887

Status: Repealed

Text of statute as originally enacted

The county court had been held at Lewes and Shoreham until 1086, when it was moved to Chichester. A petition to Parliament of 1336 from the 'community of Sussex' asked to have a place assigned for the holding of the county court. After several changes the Sussex Sheriff's County Court Act 1503 (19 Hen. 7. c. 24) (Note: For holding the Shire-Court at Chichester and Lewes.), during the reign of Henry VII, arranged for it to be held alternately at Lewes and Chichester.

In 1107–1109 there was construction of a county gaol, in Chichester Castle. The castle was demolished in around 1217 and another gaol built on the same site. That gaol is known to have been used until 1269, when the site of the prison was given to the Greyfriars to build a priory. In 1242 the counties of Surrey and Sussex were formerly united, and a sharing of prison accommodation resulted almost immediately. Sussex men were imprisoned in Guildford gaol. There were requests for the provision of a county gaol in both Chichester and Lewes at various times to no avail. However the national gaol system became overloaded during the Peasants' Revolt of 1381, and the earl of Arundel was obliged to imprison people in his castles at Arundel and Lewes. Thus Sussex managed to get a county gaol again at Lewes in 1487 and there it remained until it was moved to Horsham in 1541 for a period.

In the middle of the 16th century, the assizes were usually held at Horsham or East Grinstead. In the middle of the 17th century, a gaol was built in Horsham, then in 1775 a new gaol was built to replace it. In 1788 an additional gaol was built at Petworth, known as the Petworth House of Correction. There were further Houses of Correction built at Lewes and Battle.

It is believed that the last case of someone being executed by being pressed to death (peine forte et dure), in the country, was carried out in 1735 at Horsham. At the assizes a man who pretended to be dumb and lame was indicted for murder and robbery. When he was brought to the bar, he would not speak or plead. Witnesses told the court that they had heard him speak so he was taken back to Horsham gaol. As he would not plead they laid 100 pounds (45 kg) weight on him, then as he still would not plead, they added 100 pounds (45 kg) more, and a further 100 pounds (45 kg) making a total of 300 pounds (140 kg) weight, still he would not speak; so 50 pounds (23 kg) more was added, when he was nearly dead, the executioner, who weighed about 16 stone (100 kg) or 17 stone (110 kg), laid down upon the board which was over him, and killed him in an instant.

In 1824 there were 109 prisoners in Horsham Gaol, 233 in Petworth House of Correction, 591 in Lewes House of Correction and 91 in Battle House of Correction. The last public hanging in Sussex was at Horsham in 1844, a year before the gaol finally closed.

The sheriff's function was to be responsible for the civil justice within the county. Surrey and Sussex shared one sheriff until 1567 when the function was split. Then in 1571 the two counties again shared one sheriff, finally each county was given their own sheriff in 1636. The office of High Sheriff for Sussex then continued until 1974 when it was ended by the local government re-organisation that split Sussex into the two counties of East and West Sussex.

During time of internal unrest or foreign invasions it was usual for the monarch to appoint a lieutenant of the county. The policy of appointing temporary lieutenants continued until the reign of Henry VIII, when Lords Lieutenant were introduced as standing representatives of the crown. The first Lord Lieutenant of the County of Sussex was Sir Richard Sackville in 1550; the Lord Lieutenant was usually also the custos rotulorum of the county and Sackville had been given that the year before. The main duties of the Lords Lieutenant was to oversee the military in the county; in Sussex this was the Militia and the Sussex Yeomanry.

As with the Sheriff, the post of Lord Lieutenant of Sussex was ended, in 1974, by the local government re-organisation. There are now separate Sheriffs and Lords Lieutenant for East and West Sussex and the modern day role is largely ceremonial.

Private jurisdictions, both ecclesiastical and lay, played a large part in the county. The chief ecclesiastical franchises were those of the Archbishop of Canterbury, the bishop of Chichester and also that of Battle Abbey, which was founded by William the Conqueror. The main lay franchises were those of the Cinque Ports and the Honour of Pevensey. The Cinque Ports were a group of coastal towns in Kent and Sussex that were given ancient rights and privileges. The main rights were the exemption of taxes and duties and the right to enforce the laws in their jurisdiction. In return for these privileges they were duty bound to provide ships and men in the time of war for the crown.

Traditionally when a collection of lands owned by the Crown is held in tenancy then the tenant is known as the tenant-in-chief and the lands held in such a way was called an honour. The Honour of Pevensey was a collection of estates in Sussex. The Honour of Pevensey was also known as the Lordship of Pevensey Castle or the Honour of The Eagle after the lords of L'Aigle who invariably were the tenant-in-chief. The name L'Aigle (French for eagle) is supposedly derived from a town in Normandy, named after an eagle that had built its nest in the area.

== Borough English in Sussex ==
Borough-English was the custom that lands should descend to the youngest son or daughter, or, in default of issue, to the youngest brother of the deceased. The name originated from a case in Nottingham in 1327 when the English borough, or part of the town, held to ultimogeniture and the French (Norman) part to primogeniture. In Sussex, inheritance by Borough-English could still be found on 134 manors after 1750.

Gavelkind was the practice of partible or equal inheritance, as opposed to primogeniture. It was predominant in Kent but was also found, across the county border, in Sussex. It existed in Rye, in the large manor of Brede, and in Coustard manor (in Brede parish).

Borough-English and gavelkind were finally abolished in England and Wales by the Administration of Estates Act 1925.

== Religion ==
Several polytheistic religions, including Celtic polytheism and Roman religion, were practised in Sussex before Christianity was firmly established there in the 7th century. Christianity was practised during part of the Romano-British period, but was replaced in the 5th century by the polytheistic religion of the South Saxons. According to Bede, it was the last area of what was to become England to be converted. After the Council of London of 1075 decreed that sees should be centred in cities rather than vills, the South Saxon diocese, with its see at Selsey was transferred to Chichester.

As was the case in the rest of the country, the Church of England's split with Rome during the reign of Henry VIII was felt in Sussex. There had been twenty years of religious reform, when the Catholic, Mary Tudor succeeded to the throne of England in 1553. Mary's persecution of Protestants earned her the nickname Bloody Mary. The number of Protestants burnt at the stake during her reign was around 288 nationwide and included 41 in Sussex. Most of the executions in Sussex were at Lewes.

In 1851 the authorities organised a census of places of worship in England and Wales. The figures for Sussex indicated that there were more Anglican than non-conformist places of worship. In the neighbouring counties of Hampshire and Kent, there were more non-conformist places than Anglican.

== Parliamentary history ==
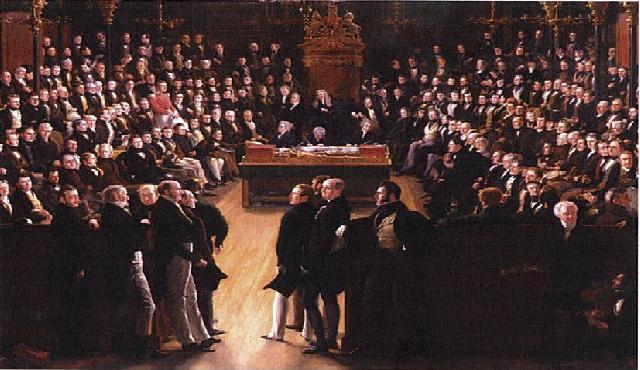
The House of Commons, 1833 by George Hayter. Picture commemorating the passing of the Reform Act 1832. It depicts the first session of the new House of Commons on 5 February 1833

The parliamentary history of the county began in the 13th century. In 1290, the first year for which a return of knights of the shire is available, Henry Hussey and William de Etchingham were elected.

In 1801 the Members of Parliament (MPs) for the counties on the south coast of England were elected to a third of all the seats in Parliament, although they represented only about 15% of the nation's population. The design of the country's electoral system had changed little since the first parliament in 1295. The counties each returned two MPs and each borough designated by royal charter also returned two MPs. This produced the situation where some of the towns of the north that had grown large during the Industrial Revolution had no representation whereas smaller towns in the south that had been important in medieval times were still able to have two MPs.

Although there had been various proposals to reform the system since 1770, it was not until 1830 that a series of factors saw the Reform Act 1832 introduced. The larger industrial towns of the north were enfranchised for the first time and smaller English boroughs (known as rotten boroughs) were disenfranchised, including Bramber, East Grinstead, Seaford, Steyning and Winchelsea in Sussex. The Representation of the People Act 1884 and the Redistribution of Seats Act 1885 (together known as the Third Reform Act) were responsible for redistributing 160 seats and extending suffrage.

After the Reform Act 1832 Sussex was divided into the eastern division and the western division and two representatives were elected for each division. In June 1832 the Honorable C.C. Cavendish and H.B. Curteis Esquire were elected in the eastern division and the Earl of Surrey and Lord John George Lennox were elected for the western division. There was a total of 3478 votes cast in the eastern division and 2365 votes in the western division.

Before the 1832 reform two members each had been returned by Arundel, Chichester, Hastings, Horsham, Lewes, Midhurst, New Shoreham (with the Rape of Bramber) and Rye. Arundel, Horsham, Midhurst and Rye were each deprived of a member in 1832, Chichester and Lewes in 1867, and Hastings in 1885. Arundel was disfranchised in 1868, and Chichester, Horsham, Midhurst, New Shoreham and Rye in 1885. Under the new system the constituencies were based on unit numbers rather than historic towns. The reforms of the 19th century made the electoral system more representative, but it was not till 1928 there was universal suffrage for men and women over 21.

== Rebellions, riots and unrest ==
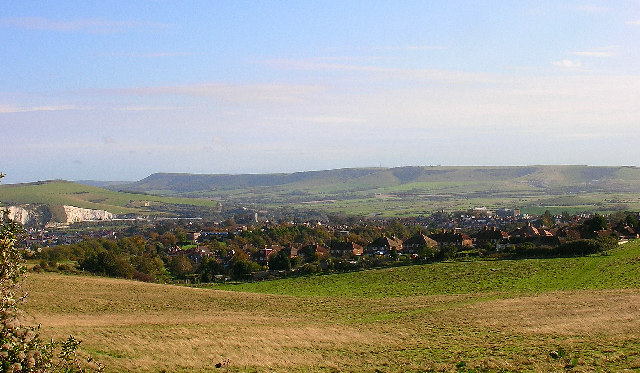
Site of the Battle of Lewes 1264

Sussex, from its position, was constantly the scene of preparations for invasion, and was often involved in rebellions.

In 1264 a group of barons led by Simon de Montfort, launched a civil war against Prince Edward, in the name of Henry III, known as the Second Barons' War. On 12 May 1264, Simon de Montfort's forces occupied a hill known as 'Offam Hill' outside Lewes. Royalist forces tried to storm the hill for over five hours but ultimately were defeated by the barons'. The actual site of what became known as the Battle of Lewes is somewhere between the town and the hill. During the 19th century, Victorian road builders constructing the Brighton-Lewes turnpike in the area of the battle discovered mass graves with around 2000 bodies in them.

During the Middle Ages the Wealden peasants rose up in revolt on two occasions, the Peasants' Revolt in 1381 under Wat Tyler, and in Jack Cade's rebellion of 1450. Cade's rebellion was not just supported by the peasant class, but many gentlemen, craftspeople and artisans, as well as the Abbot of Battle and Prior of Lewes, flocked to his standard in revolt against the corrupt government of Henry VI. Jack Cade was fatally wounded in a skirmish at Heathfield in 1450.

At the time of the English Civil War the county's sympathies were divided: Arundel supported the King, while Chichester, Lewes and the Cinque Ports were for Parliament. Most of the west of the county were for the King and included a powerful group with the bishop of Chichester and Sir Edward Ford, sheriff of Sussex, in their number. Exceptionally, Chichester was for Parliament, largely due to an influential brewer named William Cawley. However the group of royalists led by Edward Ford managed to get a force together to capture Chichester in 1642 for the King and imprisoned 200 parliamentarians.

The roundhead army under Sir William Waller besieged Arundel and after its fall marched on Chichester and restored it to Parliament. A military governor, Algernon Sidney was appointed in 1645. Chichester was then demilitarised in 1647–1648 and remained in Parliament's hands for the rest of the civil war. The brewer William Cawley became an MP for Chichester in 1647 and was one of the signatories on King Charles I's death warrant.

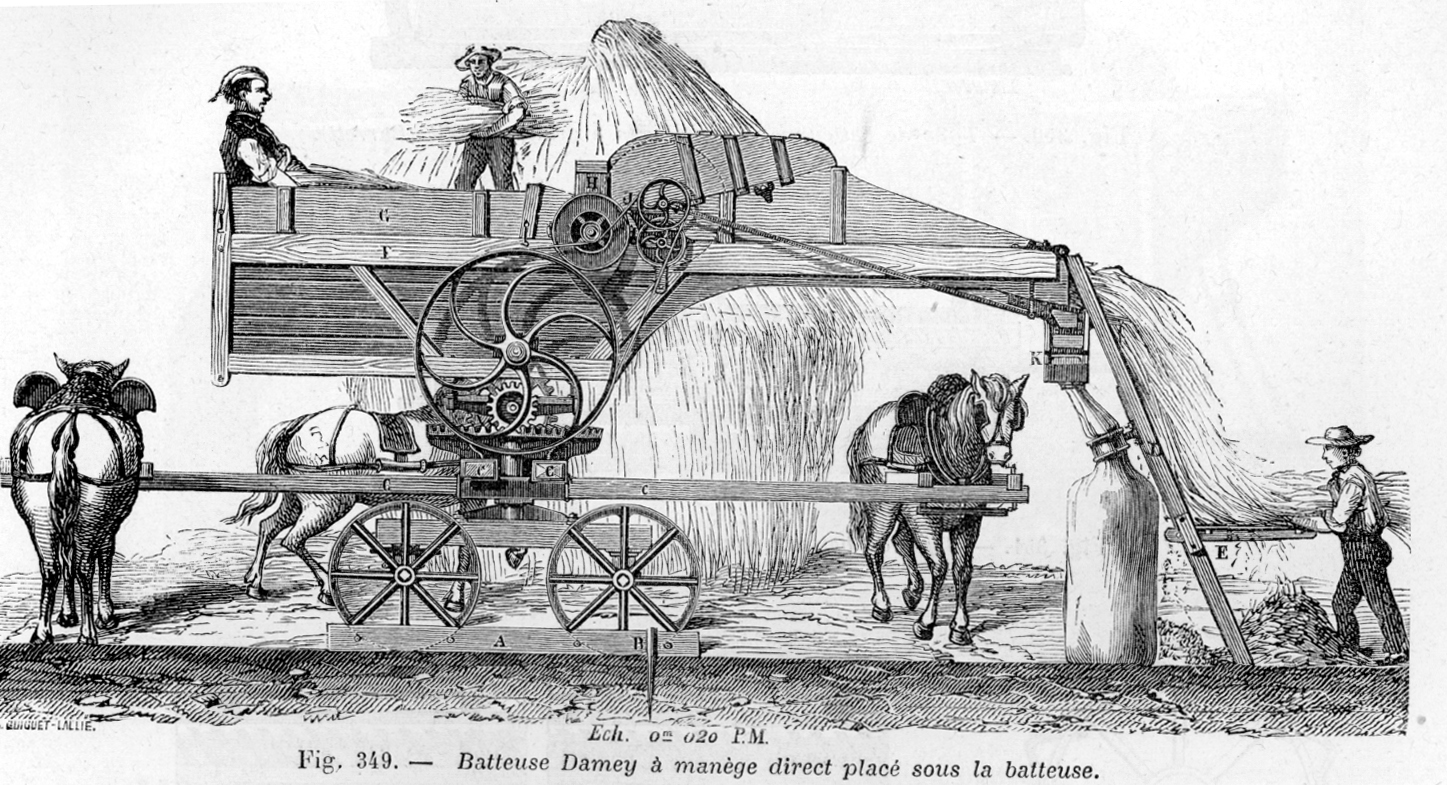
19th-century threshing machine.

At the beginning of the 19th century, agricultural labourers' conditions took a turn for the worse with an increasing amount of them becoming unemployed, while those remaining employed faced their wages being forced down. Conditions became so bad that it was even reported to the House of Lords in 1830 that four harvest labourers (seasonal workers) had been found dead of starvation. The deteriorating conditions of work for the agricultural labourer eventually triggered riots in Kent during the summer of 1830. Similar action spread across the county border to Sussex where the riots lasted for several weeks, although the unrest continued until 1832 and were known as the Swing Riots.

The Swing riots were accompanied by action against local farmers and land owners. Typically, a threatening letter would be sent to a local farmer or leader demanding that automated equipment such as threshing machines should be withdrawn from service, wages should be increased and there would be a threat of consequences if this did not happen. The letter would be signed by a mythical Captain Swing. This would be followed up by the destruction of farm equipment and occasionally arson.

Eventually the army was mobilised to contain the situation in the eastern part of the county, whereas in the west the Duke of Richmond took action against the protesters by the use of the yeomanry and special constables. The Sussex Yeomanry were subsequently disparagingly nicknamed the workhouse guards. The protesters faced charges of arson, robbery, riot, machine breaking and assault. Those convicted faced imprisonment, transportation or ultimately execution. The grievances continued encouraging a wider demand for political reform, culminating in the introduction of the Reform Act 1832.

One of the main grievances of the Swing protesters had been what they saw as inadequate Poor Law benefits, Sussex had the highest poor-relief costs during the agricultural depression of 1815 to the 1830s and its workhouses were full. The general unrest, particularly about the state of the workhouses, was instrumental in the introduction of the Poor Law Amendment Act 1834.

== Wars ==
During the French Revolution and Napoleonic Wars (1793–1815), a European coalition was formed that included Britain, with the intention of crushing the newly founded French Republic. This led to defensive measures being taken in Sussex.

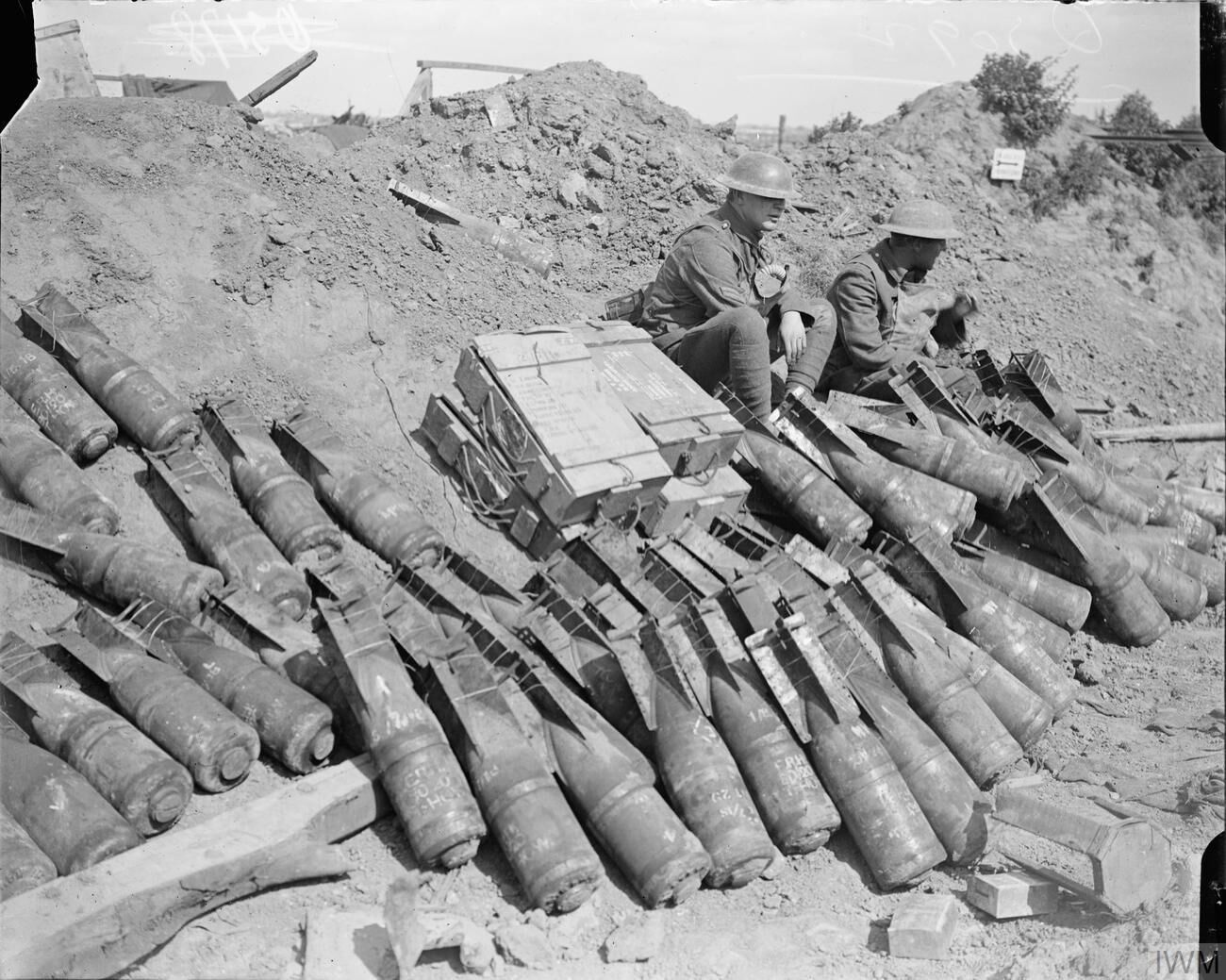
1918, near Lens in France. Two men of the 9th Battalion, Royal Sussex Regiment sit beside a dump of trench mortar bombs.

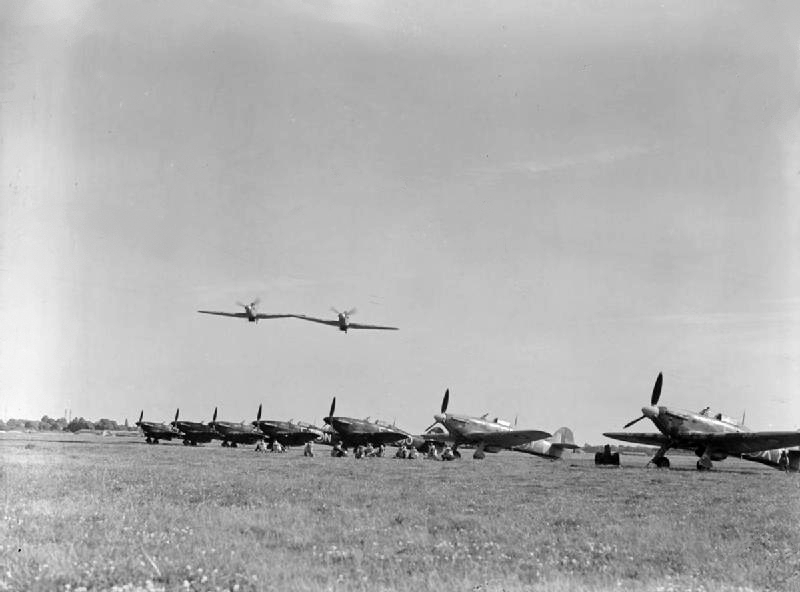
1942. Two Hawker Hurricane Mark IIs of No. 43 Squadron RAF make a low level pass over other aircraft of the Squadron, lined up at RAF Tangmere, Sussex

In 1793 at Brighton two batteries were built on the town's east and west cliffs (replacing older installations). The Sussex Yeomanry was founded in 1794, and numbers of gentlemen and yeomen volunteered to join the part-time cavalry regiment to serve in case of invasion by Bonaparte. Between 1805 and 1808 a series of defensive towers known as Martello towers were erected along the Sussex and Kent coasts, and later on the east coast. The Admiralty commissioned a visual signalling system to allow communications between ships and the shore and from there to the Admiralty in London; Sussex had a total of 16 signalling stations on its coast. A central fort and supply base for the towers, the Eastbourne Redoubt at Eastbourne was constructed between 1804 and 1810. It is now home to the Royal Sussex Regiment Museum. In the 1860s, possible wars with France prompted more defence building, including the fort at Newhaven.

At the outbreak of the First World War in August 1914, the landowners of the county employed their local leadership roles to recruit volunteers for the nation's forces. The owner of Herstmonceux Castle, Claude Lowther, recruited enough men for three Southdown Battalions that were known as Lowther's Lambs. The Royal Sussex Regiment fielded a total of 23 battalions in the Great War. After the war, St George's Chapel, in Chichester Cathedral, was restored and furnished as a memorial to the fallen of the Royal Sussex Regiment. Nearly 7,000 of the regiment died in the First World War, and their names are recorded on the panels that are attached to the walls of the chapel.

On the Sussex boys are stirring
In the wood-land and the Downs
We are moving in the hamlet
We are rising in the town;
For the call is King and Country
Since the foe has asked for war,
And when danger calls, or duty
We are always to the fore.
From Lowther's Lambs marching song.

With the declaration of the Second World War on 3 September 1939, Sussex found itself part of the country's frontline with its airfields playing a key role in the Battle of Britain and with its towns being some of the most frequently bombed. The first line of defence was the coastal crust consisting of pillboxes, machine-gun posts, trenches, rifle posts, anti-tank obstacles plus scaffolding, mines and barbed wire. As the Sussex regiments were serving overseas for large parts of the war, the defence of the county was undertaken by units of the Home Guard with help between 1941 and early 1944 from the First Canadian Army.

During the war every part of Sussex was affected. Army camps of both the tented and also the more permanent variety sprang up everywhere. Sussex played host to many servicemen and women, including the 2nd Canadian Infantry Division, the 4th Armoured Brigade, the 30th US Division, the 27th Armoured Brigade and the 15th Scottish Division. Besides airmen and women from the British Commonwealth, fighter squadrons from the Free Belgian, Free French, Free Czechs, Free Polish were regularly based at airfields around Sussex.

During the lead-up to the D-Day landings, the people of Sussex were witness to the build-up of military personnel and materials, including the assembly of landing crafts and construction of Mulberry harbours off the county's coast. Five new airfields were built to provide additional support for the D-Day landings, four near Chichester and one near Billingshurst.

A legacy of the D-Day landings are the sections of Mulberry harbour that lay broken and abandoned on the sea floor 2 miles (3.2 km) off the coast, of Selsey Bill, having missed the invasion.

== Economy of Sussex ==
Sussex was an industrial county from the Stone Age, with the early production of flint implements until when the use of coal and steam power moved industry nearer the coalfields of the north and midlands. The county also has been known for its agriculture.

=== Agriculture ===
Sussex has retained much of its rural nature: apart from the coastal strip, it has few large towns. Although in 1841 over 40% of the population were employed in agriculture (including fishing), today less than 2% are so employed. The wide range of soil types in the county leads to great variations in the patterns of farming. The Wealden parts are mostly wet sticky clays or drought-prone acid sands and often broken up into small irregular fields and woods by the topography, making it unsuitable for intensive arable farming. Pastoral or mixed farming has always been the pattern here, with field boundaries often little changed since the medieval period.

Sussex cattle are the descendants of the draught oxen, which continued to be used in the Weald longer than in other parts of England. Agriculturalist Arthur Young commented in the early 18th century that the cattle of the Weald "must be unquestionably ranked among the best of the kingdom." William Cobbett, riding through Ashdown Forest, said he had seen some of the finest cattle in the country on some of the poorest farms.

Areas of cereals grown on the Weald have risen and declined with the price of grain. The chalk downlands were traditionally grazed by large numbers of small Southdown sheep, suited to the low fertility of the pasture, until the coming of artificial fertiliser made cereal growing worthwhile. Yields are still limited by the alkalinity of the soil. Apart from a few areas of alluvial loam soil in the river valleys, the best and most intensively farmed soils are on the coastal plain, where large-scale vegetable growing is commonplace. Glasshouse production is also concentrated along the coast where hours of sunshine are greater than inland.

There are still fishing fleets, notably at Rye and Hastings, but the number of boats is much reduced. Historically, the fisheries were of great importance, including cod, herring, mackerel, sprats, plaice, sole, turbot, shrimps, crabs, lobsters, oysters, mussels, cockles, whelks and periwinkles. Bede records that St Wilfrid, when he visited the county in 681, taught the people the art of net-fishing. At the time of the Domesday survey, the fisheries were extensive and no fewer than 285 salinae (saltworks) existed. The customs of the Brighton fishermen were documented in 1579.

=== Iron working ===
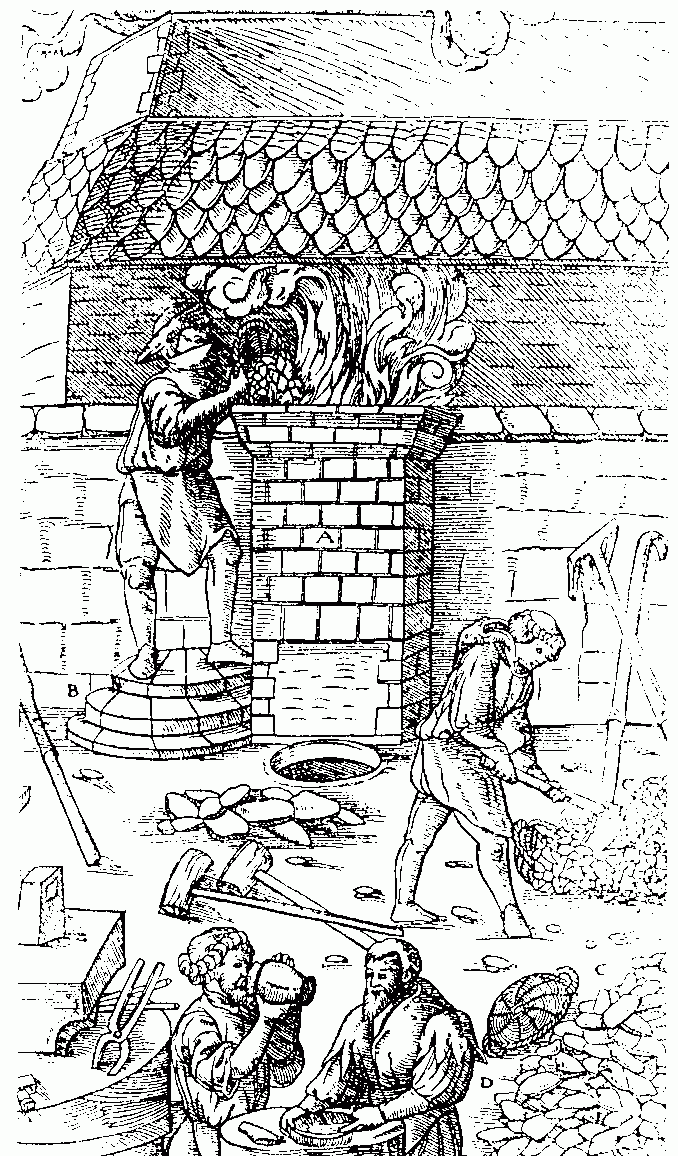
Example of a medieval furnace or bloomery

Iron Age wrought iron was produced by means of a bloomery followed by reheating and hammering. With the type that was common in Sussex a round shallow hearth was dug out, clay hard-packed to line it, then layers of hammered ore and charcoal were put down and the whole lot covered by a clay beehive structure, with holes at the side for the insertion of foot or hand bellows. The material inside the beehive furnace was then ignited and it took two to three days for the process to complete, leaving semi-molten lumps of iron, known as blooms on the hearth. The output from these types of furnace was very small as everything had to cool down before the iron could be retrieved. The iron so retrieved could then be worked by using the heat and beat technique to form wrought iron implements such as weapons or tools. Around a dozen pre-Roman sites have been found in eastern Sussex, the westernmost being at Crawley.

The Romans made full use of this resource, continuing and intensifying native methods, and iron slag was widely used as paving material on the Roman roads of the area. The Roman iron industry was mainly in East Sussex with the largest sites in the Hastings area. The industry is thought to have been organised by the Classis Britannica, the Roman navy.

Little evidence has been found of iron production after the Romans left until the ninth century, when a primitive bloomery, of a continental style, was built at Millbrook on Ashdown Forest, with a small hearth for reheating the blooms nearby. Production based on bloomeries then continued until the end of the 15th century, when a new technique was imported from northern France that allowed the production of cast iron. A permanent blast furnace was constructed; into the furnace chamber was inserted a pipe fed by bellows that could be operated by a wheel; the wheel was rotated by the use of water power, oxen or horses. Pairs of bellows continuously forced air into the furnace chamber, producing higher temperatures such that the iron completely melted and could be run off from the base of the chamber and into moulds. This allowed a continuous process that usually ran during the winter and spring seasons, ceasing when water supplies to drive the bellows dwindled in the summer.

"Full of iron mines it is in sundry places, where for the making and fining whereof there bee furnaces on every side, and a huge deale of wood is yearely spent..."
From William Camden's description of 17th century Sussex.

Henry VIII urgently needed cannon for his new coastal forts, but casting these in the traditional bronze would have been very expensive. Previously iron cannons had been made by building up bands of iron bound together with iron hoops; such cannons had been used at Bannockburn in 1314. There had also been some cast cannons made in the Weald but with separate barrels and breeches.

In Buxted the local vicar, the Reverend William Levett, was also a gun-founder. He recruited a Ralf Hogge to help him produce cannon and in 1543 his employee cast an iron muzzle-loading cannon. It was cast in one piece, using a pattern based on the latest bronze ordnance. The navy complained that the new guns were too heavy but bronze was ten times more costly, so in fortifications and for arming merchant ships iron guns were preferred. Gradually, owing to their toughness and validiti, an important export trade in wealden guns built up and they remained dominant internationally until displaced by Swedish guns around 1620. Both men made a lot of money out of the trade, and Hogge built a house on the road to Levetts church. Hogge put a rebus on his house, with a hog on it as a pun for his name.

The large supply of wood in the county made it a favourable centre for the industry, all smelting being done with charcoal till the middle of the 18th century.

=== Glass making ===
The glass making industry started on the Sussex/Surrey border in the early 13th century and flourished until the 17th century. The industry in Sussex spread during the 16th century to Wisborough Green, then to Alfold, Ewhurst, Billingshurst and Lurgashall. Many of the artisans in the industry were immigrants from France and Germany. The manufacturing process used timber for fuel, sand and potash (which served as flux).

Glass production in the English midlands using coal for the smelting process, plus opposition to the use of timber in Sussex, led to the collapse of the Sussex glass-making industry in 1612.

=== Forestry ===
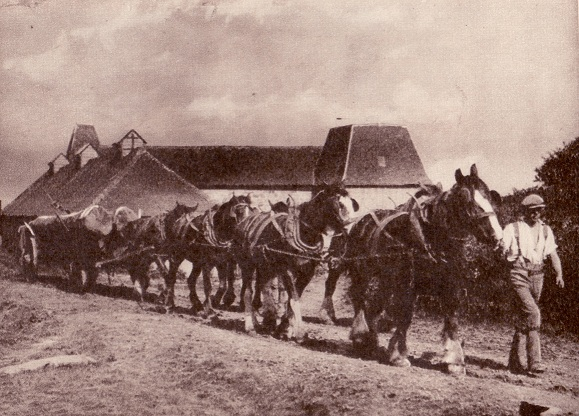
Hauling timber from Sussex woods.

When the Romans arrived in Sussex around AD 43, they would have found remote bands of people smelting iron in the forest of Andresweald. Timber was used to produce charcoal to fuel the smelting process. There is evidence that the Roman engineers improved the road system in the area, by first metalling the old cart tracks and then putting in new roads. This was so they could produce and distribute the wrought iron more efficiently.

The Anglo-Saxon Chronicle, commissioned in the 9th century by Alfred the Great, provides a description of the forest that covered the Sussex Weald. It says that the forest was 120 miles (190 km) wide and 30 miles (48 km) deep (although probably closer to 90 miles (140 km) wide). The forest was so dense that even the Domesday Book did not record some of its settlements.

The Weald was not the only area of Sussex that was forested in Saxon times: for example at the western end of Sussex is the Manhood Peninsula, which these days is largely deforested. The name is probably derived from the Old English maene-wudu meaning "men's wood" or "common wood" indicating that it was once woodland.

During and before the reign of Henry VIII, England imported much of the wood for its naval ships from the Hanseatic league. Henry wanted to source the materials for his army and navy domestically. So it was largely the forests of Sussex that met this demand for wood, Sussex oak being considered the finest shipbuilding timber. Vast amounts of wood were consumed to build ships and produce charcoal for the foundry furnaces. Faced with diminishing stocks of wood due to the large consumption from the ship, iron and glass making industries, Parliament introduced bills to manage the stocks more efficiently. However the parliamentary bills were never passed, with the result that the county's forests were decimated. The poet Michael Drayton in his poem Poly-Olbion, published in the early 17th century, made the trees denounce the iron trade:

Jove's oak, the war-like ash, veined elm, the softer beech
Short hazel, maple plain, light asp and bending wych
Tough holly and smooth birch, must altogether burn.
What should the builder serve, the forger's turn
When under publick good, base private gain takes hold.
And we, poor woeful woods, to ruin lastly sold.
From Michael Drayton's Poly-Olbion

Despite parliamentary efforts the forests of Sussex continued to be consumed. However, in 1760 Abraham Darby discovered how to replace charcoal with coke in his blast furnaces, which resulted in production being moved nearer the coal mines. By that time the forests had been completely devastated and the roads ruined by the transport of ore and pig iron. The High Weald still has about 35,905 hectares (138.63 sq mi) of woodland, including areas of ancient woodland equivalent to about 7% of the stock for all England. When the Anglo Saxon Chronicle was compiled in the 9th century, there was thought to be about 2,700 square miles (700,000 ha) of forest in the Sussex Weald.

=== Wool ===
In 1340-1341 there were about 110,000 sheep in Sussex. Edward III commanded that his Chancellor should sit on the woolsack in council as a symbol of the pre-eminence of the wool trade at the time. In 1341 the greatest wool production in Sussex was in the eastern part of the county, and in the west of the county the port of Chichester was extended along the whole coast from Southampton to Seaford for the collection of customs on wool. Also Chichester, despite its geographical disadvantages ranked as the seventh port in the kingdom and was one of the wool ports named in the Statute of the Staple of 1353.

In the early 15th century, most production of wool was within 15 miles (24 km) of Lewes. In the 16th century weavers were to be found in nearly every parish, as were fullers and dyers. Chichester was an early centre for the weaving of cloth and also for the spinning of linen.

In 1566 an act that prohibited the export of "unwrought or unfinished cloths" led to the demise of the industry in Sussex, and by the beginning of the 18th century it had virtually collapsed; Daniel Defoe commented, in 1724, that the "..whole counties of Kent, Sussex, Surrey and Hampshire, are not employ'd in any considerable Woolen Manufacture;".

=== Clay working (pottery, tiles, bricks) ===
As much of the Mid Sussex area has clay not far under the surface, clay has in the past been a focus of industry in central Sussex, in particular in the Burgess Hill area. In the first quarter of the 20th century, Burgess Hill and the Hassocks and Hurstpierpoint areas had many kilns, clay pits and similar infrastructure to support the clay industry; nowadays the majority of this form of industry has left the area, although it still can be seen in place names such as "Potters Lane", "Meeds Road", "The Kiln"; Meeds Pottery was once a significant pottery in the centre of Burgess Hill. At the height of the success of this industry, tiles and bricks from Sussex were used to build landmarks such as Manchester's G-Mex. In 2007 the local district council produced plans to close the only remaining tile works in the area and use the site for residential development. Then in 2015 the last tile works moved to a new home in Surrey.

== Communications ==
=== Roads ===
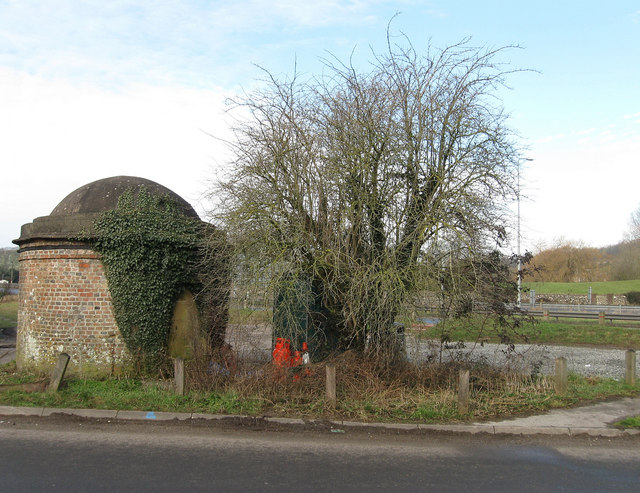
Ashcombe Toll House, originally part of the old Brighton - Lewes Turnpike.

After the Romans left, roads in the country fell into disrepair and in Sussex the damage was compounded by the transport of material for the iron industry. A government report described the condition of a road between Surrey and Sussex in the 17th century as "very ruinous and almost impassable." In 1749 Horace Walpole wrote to a friend complaining that if he desired good roads "never to go into Sussex" and another writer said that the "Sussex road is an almost insuperable evil". Because of the state of the county's roads the major transport network for Sussex had been by way of sea and river, but this had become increasingly unreliable as well.

Roads had been maintained by the parishes, in a system established in 1555, a system that had proved increasingly ineffective given the relentless increase in traffic. Consequently, in 1696, during the reign of William III, the first Turnpike Act was passed and was for the repair of the highway between Reigate in Surrey and Crawley in Sussex. The act made provision to erect turnpikes, and appoint toll collectors; also to appoint surveyors, who were authorised by order of the Justices to borrow money at 5 per cent, on security of the tolls.

Other turnpike acts followed with the roads being built and maintained by local trusts and parishes. The majority of the roads were maintained by a toll levied on each passenger (who usually would have been transported by stage coach). A few roads were still maintained by the parishes with no toll levied. There were 152 Acts of Parliament by the mid-19th century for the formation, renewal and amendment of the turnpikes in the county. A report on the county's turnpike trusts, published in 1857, said that there were fifty-one trusts covering 640 miles (1,030 km) of road, with 238 toll gates or bars, giving an average of one toll gate every 2.5 miles (4.0 km).

The last turnpike to be constructed in the county was between Cripps Corner and Hawkhurst in 1841. The system of turnpikes, coaches and coaching inns collapsed in the face of competition from the railways. By 1870 most of the county's Turnpike Trusts were wound up, putting hundreds of coachmen and coachbuilders out of business. The conditions of the county's roads then deteriorated until the creation of the new county council in 1889, who assumed responsibility for the maintenance of the county's roads.

At the beginning of the 20th century, nearly all the first class roads had been turnpikes in 1850. During the course of the 20th century, the car and the lorry challenged the supremacy of the railways.

The two counties of East and West Sussex only have a total of 12 kilometres (7.5 miles) of motorway and relatively small amounts of dual carriageway. Two of the "A" roads that traverse Sussex from east to west are the A27 and the A259. These two roads provide the major routes across Sussex. The route is only dual-carriageway for part of its length; both roads run parallel to the Sussex coast.

The main north–south road, which connects the coast to the London orbital M25, is the M23/A23. According to the Highways Agency the removal of most of the east/west bottlenecks, for example improvements to the Chichester bypass, will not occur for some time to come.

=== Canals and navigations ===
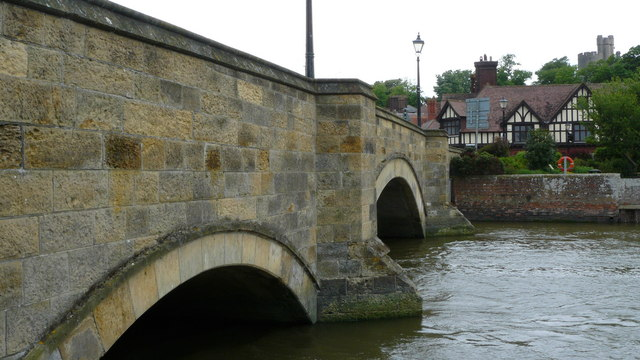
Bridge at Arundel. This bridge, across the River Arun, marks the limit of navigation

The first canals that were constructed in Sussex can be described as navigations, in that their purpose was to make the lower reaches of the county's rivers navigable. The rivers had suffered from centuries of neglect, which had made navigation, even for small craft, difficult.

Examples of navigations in Sussex are:

- Arun Navigation
- Rother Valley Navigation

Eventually, true canals were also built, examples being:

- Wey and Arun Canal
- Portsmouth and Arundel Canal
- Hythe Military Canal

When the railways arrived in Sussex, they provided an alternative to the canals and waterways. The canal companies' revenue quickly dropped, resulting in most of them closing for business by the beginning of World War I.

=== Railways ===
In 1804 Richard Trevithick, a Cornish engineer, built the first steam locomotive for a railway. His seven-tonne locomotive hauled 10 tonnes of iron and 70 passengers on a journey of 9 miles (14 km) from the Penydarren Ironworks near Merthyr Tydfil to the Glamorganshire Canal at Abercynon, reaching a top speed of almost 5 miles per hour (8.0 km/h).

George Stephenson built the engine Locomotion for the Stockton & Darlington railway, which was opened in 1825 for both passenger and goods traffic; Locomotion pulled thirty-six wagons containing coal, grain and 500 passengers a distance of 9 miles (14 km) at a top speed of 15 miles per hour (24 km/h).

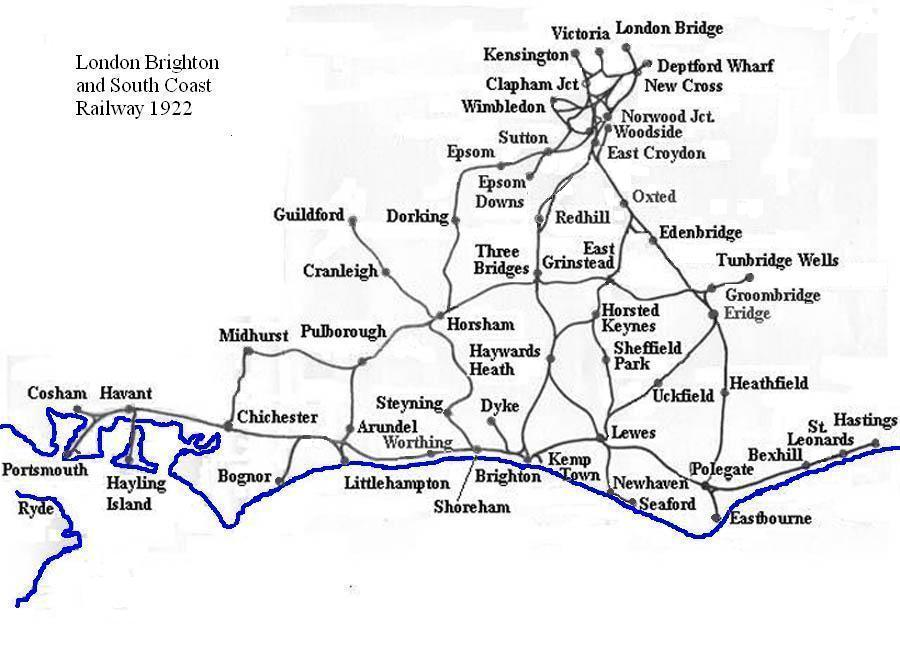
Map of London, Brighton & South Coast Railway routes in 1922

The Manchester to Liverpool railway of 1830 was the first to convey passengers and goods entirely by mechanical traction. Stephenson's Rocket, which won the famous Rainhill Trials in 1829, was the first steam locomotive designed to pull passenger traffic quickly.

Brighton's proximity to London made it an ideal place to provide short holidays for Londoners. In the 1830s, during the summer the London-Brighton road would see around 40 coaches a day plus a number of private carriages taking visitors to the coast. The road was in a poor condition so proposals to build a railway were suggested as early as 1806. However, it was not till 1823 that a serious scheme was mooted. There followed years of discussion and argument with various groups proposing different routes; then finally in 1837 the London and Brighton Railway Bill with branches to Shoreham and Newhaven received Royal assent. In 1838 the directors of the London & Brighton Railway (L&BR) stated that the railway would be different from the rest of the country in that it would be a passenger-only railway.

In the 18th century Brighton had been a town in terminal decline. It was described by Daniel Defoe as 'a poor fishing town, old built', fast eaten away by an 'unkind' sea. This changed after two things happened:

1. In 1750 a Dr Richard Russell recommended Brighton for a seawater cure.
2. From 1783 the Prince of Wales started visiting Brighton on a regular basis making it a fashionable destination.

These two events increased the number of visitors to the town. However, in 1841 when the L&BR opened for business, of Brighton's 8,137 stock of houses, some 1,095 stood empty. But within 40 years of the railway's arrival, Brighton's resident population had doubled.

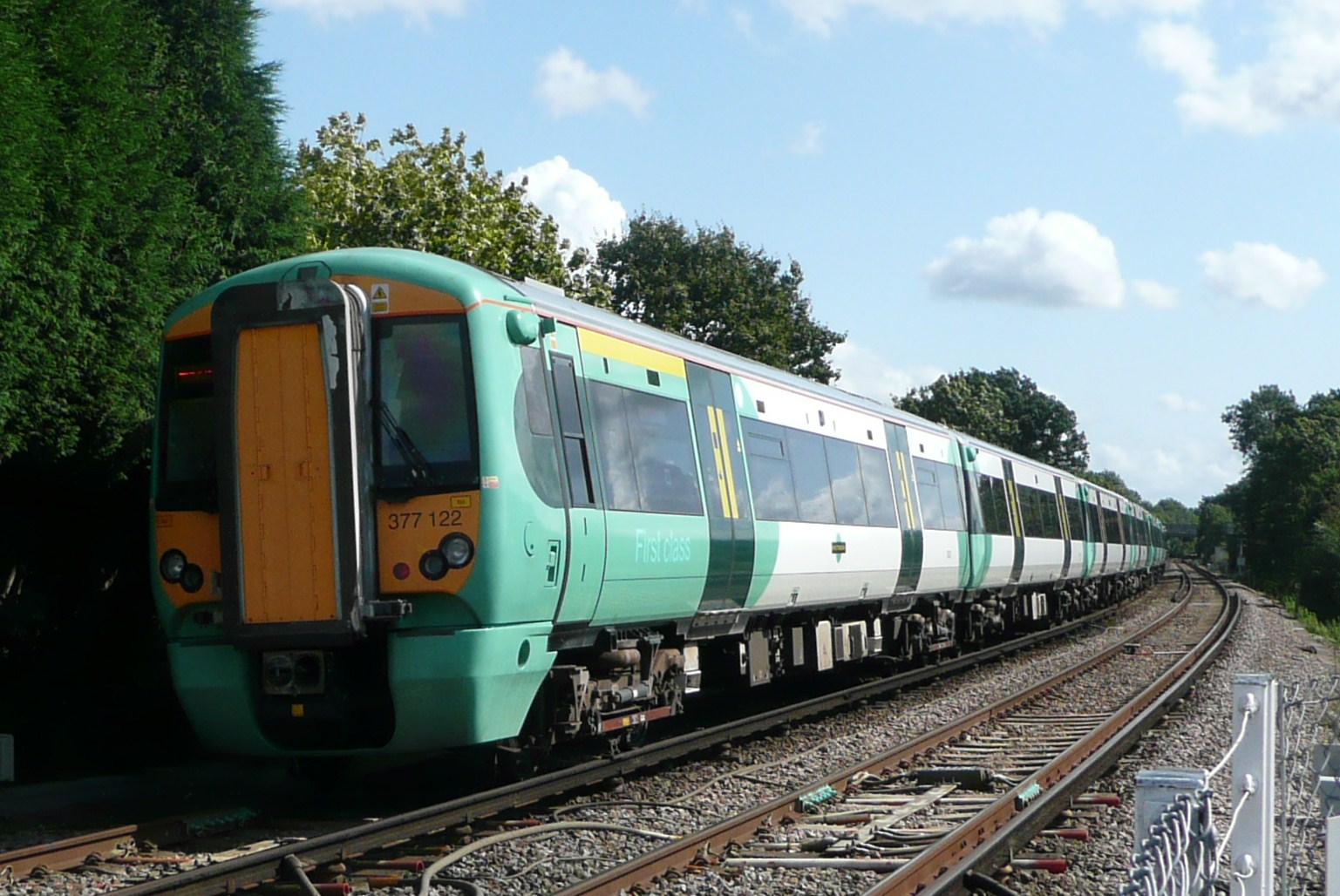
Typical Southern train leaving Warnham station.

After the opening of the Brighton line, within a few years branches were made to Chichester to the west and Hastings and Eastbourne to the east. In 1846 the L&BR merged with the London & Croydon Railway, the Brighton & Chichester Railway and the Brighton, Lewes & Hastings Railway to form the London, Brighton & South Coast Railway (LB&SCR). The LB&SCR continued as an independent entity until the Railways Act 1921, which saw the merger of various rail companies in the south and south east into the Southern Railway Company (SR); formed on 1 January 1923. Two railway companies in the county that were not absorbed by the SR, were Volk's Electric Railway the world's first electric railway, that runs along the front at Brighton and opened in 1883, and the West Sussex Railway, a light railway between Chichester and Selsey, opened in 1897 (and closed in 1935).

SR was the smallest of four groups that were brought together by the Railways Act 1921. The LB&SCR had partly electrified their network before World War I, though that had been an overhead system. SR decided to electrify their network using the third rail DC system. During World War II the SR was heavily involved with transporting armed services traffic and was bombed on many occasions. After the war SR was nationalised in 1948 and became the Southern Region of British Railways.

Following John Major's victory in the 1992 General Election, the conservative government published a white paper, indicating their intention to privatise the railways. The government went ahead with their plans and franchises were awarded to train operating companies (TOC).

Most services in Sussex are operated by Greater Thameslink Railway including the Gatwick Express service between Victoria and Gatwick Airport. Southern Railway who manage the south coast and services to Victoria and London Bridge. Also Thameslink for services between Brighton and Bedford, and from Brighton to Cambridge and Horsham to Peterborough.

In September 2021, the government announced that Southeastern would take over the South Eastern franchise from Govia that operates between eastern Sussex and London.

=== Ports ===
The two major ports in Sussex are at Newhaven, opened in 1579, and at Shoreham opened in 1760. Other ports such as Pevensey, Winchelsea, and the original medieval port of Rye now lie stranded from the current coastline. In addition, for smaller craft, there are working harbours at Rye Harbour and Hastings, with Brighton Marina, Pagham and Chichester harbours catering for leisure craft. Other harbours that existed such as Fishbourne, Steyning, Old Shoreham, Meeching and Bulverhythe are long since silted up and have been built over.

== See also ==
- Timeline of Sussex history
- Sussex Day - Celebrated each year on 16 June
- History of Christianity in Sussex
- History of local government in Sussex
- History of England
- History of Brighton
- History of Horsham
- History of Worthing
- Weald and Downland Open Air Museum - containing about 50 historic buildings dating from the 13th to 19th century.
