= Oxfordshire Day =

Annual observance in Oxfordshire, England

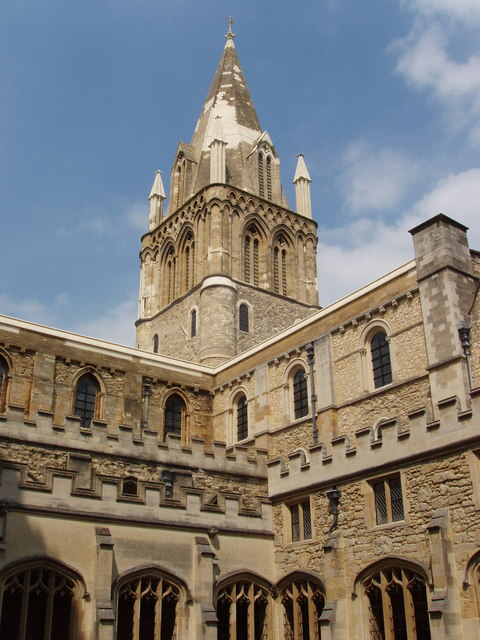
- Christ Church Cathedral, Oxford
- Also called: St Frideswide's Day
- Observed by: The Oxfordshire Association, Diocese of Oxford
- Date: 19 October
- Next time: 19 October 2027
- Frequency: annual
- Related to: St Frideswide

Oxfordshire Day is celebrated on 19 October to promote the historic English county of Oxfordshire. It is also the principal feast day of the patron saint of the city and university of Oxford, St Frideswide.

The commemoration of St Frideswide's Day was encouraged in the nineteenth century by Henry Liddell, Dean of Christ Church. The feast day now appears in the calendars of the Diocese of Oxford and the Roman Catholic Ordinariate of Our Lady of Walsingham. Each year there is a civic service to celebrate St Frideswide's Day in Christ Church Cathedral, Oxford, which houses her shrine.

== See also ==
- Flag of Oxfordshire
- List of county days in the United Kingdom
- St Piran's Day
- Yorkshire Day
- Sussex Day
