= History of Horsham =

History of English market town

The History of Horsham, a market town on the upper reaches of the River Arun on the fringe of the Weald in West Sussex, England, can be traced back to 947 AD, and there is evidence of earlier settlement.

== Middle Ages ==
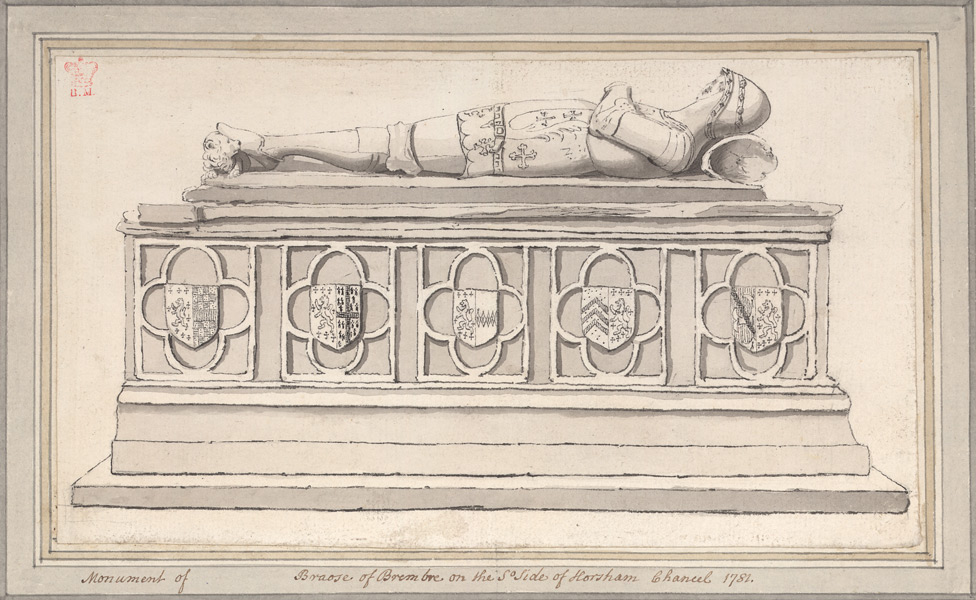
de Braose monument in St Mary's Church, Horsham, Samuel Hieronymus Grimm, 1781.

The first mention of Horsham was in King Eadred's land charter of AD 947. The town had connections to the sale of horses and recent ideas suggest the name might be derived from "Horse Ham", a settlement where horses were kept. (Note: More likely a reference to Horsens in Jutland, the origin of its Jutish settlers. The hors- prefix is fairly common in England.)

An alternative explanation is that "Horsham" is a contraction of "Horsa's Ham" named after the Anglo-Saxon warrior who was said to have been given lands in the area. (Note: This is an example of non-historical founding myths.)

Despite having been in existence for some 140 years at the time of the survey, Horsham is not mentioned in the Domesday Book either because it was never visited by inspectors, or was simply 'left out' of the final version. It lies within the ancient Norman administrative division of the Rape of Bramber and the Hundred of Singlecross.

In ancient times Horsham was controlled by the powerful de Braose family. Later the Eversfield family, which had risen from Surrey County obscurity into a powerhouse of ironmasters and landowners, built Denne Park House, their seat. The family later represented Horsham in Parliament, and controlled the Eversfield Estate in St. Leonards-on-Sea, where the seaside promenade is named for the family.

Horsham Castle, built by William de Braose in the late eleventh century, was abandoned around 1154. The castle earthworks can be found near Chennells Brook.

Horsham had two weekly markets in the Middle Ages, and was noted locally for its annual fairs.

== Modern era ==
Despite a local iron industry which stayed until the 17th century and a prosperous brewing industry, Horsham remained primarily a market town serving the many farms in the area until the early 20th century, when other industry and residential developments began to proliferate. One of these was the manufacture of bricks from the Wealden clay on which Horsham sits. Warnham and Wealden Brickworks still operate two miles north of Horsham and there are disused workings throughout the area, notably at Southwater which is now developed as an education centre and leisure park.

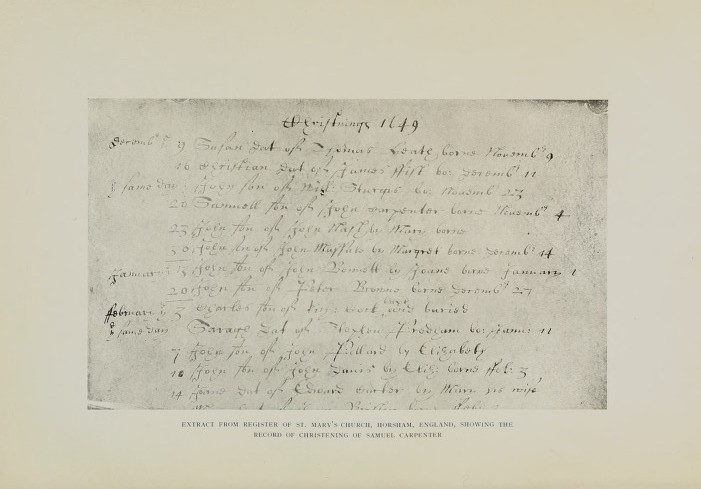
Register of birth from St. Mary's in Horsham. This records refers to Samuel Carpenter, born 1649, who emigrated to Philadelphia, Pennsylvania and was a prominent citizen and leader.

Horsham prospered during the Victorian era and early 20th century. The town, along with others, has been well documented photographically by Francis Frith. The pictures record many of the landmarks that are still in place today, although some, such the war memorial, Jubilee Fountain and Carfax Bandstand, have been moved.

Horsham remained a prominent brewery town until 2000, when the King and Barnes Brewery was closed on merger with Hall & Woodhouse, brewers of Dorset. King & Barnes was formed in 1906 from the merger of King & Sons, maltsters existing from 1850 and G H Barnes & Co., brewers whose origins date back to 1800. The brewery remained in the King family hands until the merger in 2000 when production ceased permanently. Their most famous brews included: Sussex Ale, Wealden Ale, Broadwood, Festive and the seasonal Old and Christmas Ales. The last member of the King family involved in the company brewed in Horsham at W J King & Co (Brewers) and now brews at Firebird Brewery in Rudgwick. There are four other small brewers currently operating in Horsham: Hepworth's is run by a former head brewer at King & Barnes, and Welton's, a company who were formed in Capel, Surrey, and have been in Horsham since 2004, Kissingate Brewery, and Brolly Brewing formed in 2017.

The town has grown steadily over recent years to a population of 55,657. This has been facilitated by the completion of both inner and outer town bypasses. The location of any new growth is the subject of debate. Plans by the District Council include a large neighbourhood directly adjacent to Crawley.

== Legal history ==
The last man to die by pressing in the whole of England was John Weekes of Horsham in 1735.

He was charged with robbery and murder of a woman along with three accomplices, one of whom was a small boy used to sneak inside the woman's house and open access for the other three. When police found stolen property in the possession of the men, they easily persuaded the boy into turning King's evidence. Two of the other accomplices were convicted, but when John Weekes had his turn to plead, he refused to say anything. Once the judges brought in eight witnesses who swore Weekes could talk and was not dumb, they gave him time in the cells. When he refused further to say a single word, the judges were forced to find him not guilty of murder. Instead, he was convicted of 'standing mute through malice'. Weekes was placed under three hundredweight boards, and the sixteen stone gaoler jumped on top of him. Local folklore continues the story, extending it to include the death of his executioner days later, sometimes in the same spot where the execution was carried out. Some think that he was a mute.

Public executions generally took place at a place called North Heath, now a suburb of Horsham. The road to the execution site was known for many years as Gibbet's Road but was later renamed Giblet's Road with an extension now called Giblet's Way. The last man to be put to death for homosexuality in England was in Horsham in 1835.

== Timeline ==
- c. 950 - small Anglo-Saxon village.
- 1200 - Horsham first described as a borough.
- 1278 - Edward I visits Horsham for the first time.
- 1299 - Edward I visits Horsham for the second time.
- 1324 - Edward II dates deeds at Chesworth House 1 mile south of Horsham.
- 1488 - Henry VII visits Horsham.
- 1519 - Henry VIII visits Horsham.
- 1525 - Five brewers in Horsham.
- 1532 - First Horsham Grammar School founded.
- 1560 - Suffered Plague.
- 1574 - Suffered Plague.
- 1588 - Master of the grammar school, James Alleyn, Raises a troop of soldiers at his own expense to defend Horsham against the threatened Spanish invasion.
- 1608 to 1609 - Suffered Plague.
- 1648 - Horsham was the scene of a rising of 500 or 600 royalists, supported by the borough bailiffs and constable, in protest against the policies of the parliamentary county committee: the magazine of arms kept in what was presumably the town hall was seized, but the rising was quelled by parliamentary troops under Sir Michael Livesey, at least three townsmen and one soldier being killed.
- 1659 - Around 5,000 Fifth Monarchists met at Horsham.
- 1659 - Suffered Smallpox.
- 1673 - Horsham described as being ruled by two bailiffs and two MP's.
- 1735 - John Weeks becomes the last ever man to be pressed to death, which happened in Horsham, after he murdered Elizabeth Symonds.
- 1755 - Horsham connected to London by road.
- 1776 - Ann Cruttenden was the last person to be burned at the stake in Horsham for murdering her husband (petty treason).
- 1791 - First bank in Horsham founded.
- 1796 - Barracks built to house 1,500 men.
- 1801 - Population of 1,539.
- 1804 - Travelling library at Collyers School.
- 1804 - Ammunition depot built.
- 1811 - Library Society founded and opened.
- 1812 - Town hall built by Duke of Norfolk.
- 1815 - Barracks shut and soldiers left. It was soon demolished.
- 1829 - Horsham Mechanics' Institution opened.
- 1830 - Book and Tract Society at the Unitarian Church.
- 1835 - John Sparshott becomes the second to last man to be put to death for homosexuality in England, dying at the age of 19 in Horsham.
- From 1836 - Horsham was lit by gas.
- 1839 - A police force was founded in Horsham.
- 1840 - A fire brigade was founded in Horsham.
- 1844 - John Lawrence becomes the last man to be executed via hanging in Horsham and the last man to be executed in Horsham after he bludgeoned Chief Constable Henry Solomon over the head with a poker causing him a head injury from which he later died.
- 1844 - Horsham Library Society closed.
- 1844 - Last time ever in Britain a wife was sold. They were sold for 33 shillings in the town centre.
- 1847 - Literary and Scientific Institution established.
- 1848 - Horsham was connected by rail to Brighton.
- 1851 - Population of 6,000.
- 1852 - A cemetery was founded in Horsham for the first time.
- 1860 - Horsham Mechanics' Institution closed.
- 1866 - Corn exchange and water company formed in Horsham.
- 1875 - Local government board formed.
- 1892 - Horsham hospital opened.
- 1900 - Population of 10,000.
- 1902 - Christ's Hospital school moved to Horsham.
- 1902 - Electric street lighting placed in Horsham.
- 1910 - Horsham cinema opened.
- 1920 - War memorial built.
- 1925 - Town Hall library opened.
- 1928 - Carfax branch opened.
- 1929 - Horsham Museum opened.
- 1934 - St Mark's Church Hall.
- 1935 - Horsham swimming pool opened.
- 1936 - ABC cinema (now the Capital) is opened in North Street.
- 1939 - Unitarian Library closed.
- 1940 - Worst bombing raid in Horsham. Seven people died.
- 1945 - Unitarian Library books give to town library.
- 1957 - New Library building by the Black Jug.
- 1958 - Heaviest hailstone recorded in the UK falls
- 1963 - Stockland House tower block is opened and Pearl Insurance move in.
- 1970 - Work begins to clear away an old gas works between Springfield Road and London Road, along with a row of Victorian houses for the construction of Albion Way bypass.
- 1973 - The Swan Pub in West Street is demolished to make way for an entrance for Swan Walk Shopping Centre.
- 1974 - Construction begins on the new lower school for Tanbridge House School on Worthing Road.
- 1974 - Work begins on the construction of Swan Walk Shopping Centre and Multistory Car park.
- 1976 - Swan Walk Shopping opened.
- 1983 - Odeon Cinema with a rocket sculpture sign outside is demolished to make way for Sun Alliance offices called Stains Court that eventually opens in 1987.
- 1983 - The original Capital Cinema that was surrounded by Swan Walk Shopping Centre is demolished in February 1983 to make way for the new M&S store, the proceeds from the sale of the land goes towards the purchase of the ABC Cinema in North Street that was to be transformed into Horsham Arts Centre in 1984.
- 1986 - The new Tesco's building in Broadbridge Heath is opened along with the new sports centre beside it.
- 1987 - Tesco on Worthing Road closes the building is then converted into McDonald's, Argos and Fads, the old Tesco Carpark behind the building is then used as a council carpark.
- 1987 - The Construction of Broadbridge Heath flyover on the A24 is begun, this replaced the previous ground level roundabout.
- 1988 - St Mark's Church is demolished in North Street to make way for the new Sun Alliance building that is built over Albion Way.
- 1988 - The building of a new St Mark's Church on North Heath lane is started on fields north of horsham that is to be surrounded by new housing.
- 1988 - The construction of the A264 North Horsham bypass is begun and is completed in 1989.
- 1989 - Current library building opened.
- 1989 - Swan Walk Shopping Centre refurbished and enclosed under a glass roof along with an extension called Springfield Court.
- 1990- St Mark's Church Opened by Bishop of Chichester
- 1991 - The new Sun Alliance building is opened.
- 1991 - The old Pearl Insurance tower block, Stockland House in North Street that was built in 1963 is demolished to make way for the new Sun Alliance building (now WSCC HQ).
- 1992 - Horsham Carfax is partially closed to traffic and the bandstand is relocated along with the installation of new paving and gas fired street lamps.
- 1993 - The construction of the new Tanbridge House School is commenced on land beside the A24 next to the Broadbridge heath flyover.
- 1994 - The old Tanbridge House School is closed and the building is converted into flats and the playing fields become Tanbridge Park housing estate.
- 1994 - The old Tanbridge House School lower school (school years 7–9) that was built in 1975 is demolished and a new Sainsburys is built in its place.
- 1994 - The new Tanbridge House School is opened two weeks behind schedule in late Sept.
- 1994 - New Sun Alliance building is opened in the place of the demolished Stockland House.
- 1996 - Rising universe sculpture created (locally known as Shelley's Fountain).
- 1999 - Brewing industry ended in Horsham including the closure of the national chain of brewers, King and Barnes and their factory in Horsham.
- 2003 - Pavilions in the Park opened in Horsham.
- 2003 - The Forum opened by Queen Elizabeth II.
- 2003 - The Capitol Theatre and Arts Centre was opened by Queen Elizabeth II.
- 2005 - Chesworth School is closed and Kingslea Primary school opens in its place.
- 2008 - Population of 55,657 recorded.
- 2009 - Finance ministers and central bankers of the G-20 met at South Lodge in Horsham on 14 March, for a meeting to prepare for the London summit of 2 April.
- 2022 Mowbray Village begins to be built.

Major housing developments to the South-West and North-East of the town have been progressing in recent years.

== See also ==
- History of Sussex
