= Suffolk Day =

Annual celebration of Suffolk

- Official name: Suffolk Day
- Observed by: Residents of Suffolk
- Type: Cultural
- Significance: Celebration of Suffolk
- Celebrations: Local celebrations, Flying the Suffolk flag, Awarding the Suffolk Medal
- Date: 21 June
- Frequency: Annual
- First time: 2017; 9 years ago
- Started by: Mark Murphy
- Related to: Yorkshire Day

Suffolk Day is an annual celebration of the county of Suffolk. The day was instigated by Mark Murphy from BBC Radio Suffolk, who was inspired after noticing that Carol Kirkwood made weather reports with a greater focus on Yorkshire on August 1.

It is celebrated every year on June 21 - this is the longest day of the year in the Northern Hemisphere.

== Suffolk Day launch ceremony ==
Though events are held across Suffolk, Suffolk Day is launched at an annual ceremony. These ceremonies are attended by dignitaries from across Suffolk, and are free to attend by any member of the public.

A ceremony is held annually in Suffolk. The location varies each year, with the next host being announced at the end of the current ceremony.

- 2017: Lowestoft
- 2018: Sudbury
- 2019: Felixstowe
- 2020: Online due to COVID-19
- 2021: Clare
- 2022: Framlingham
- 2023: Ipswich
- 2024: Haverhill
- 2025: Lowestoft
- 2026: Bury St Edmunds

=== Suffolk Day proclamation ===
During the ceremony, a proclamation is read. The proclamation is written especially for each occasion, conveying the hopes of the host town and the county of Suffolk as a whole.

In 2025, the proclamation was composed by students of schools across Lowestoft, citing influences from Benjamin Britten to The Darkness.

In 2026, the proclamation was delivered by students from Abbeygate Sixth Form Centre in Bury St Edmunds. This proclamation highlighted the role of the town's culture and heritage, including its role in the creation of Magna Carta.

=== Suffolk Medal ===
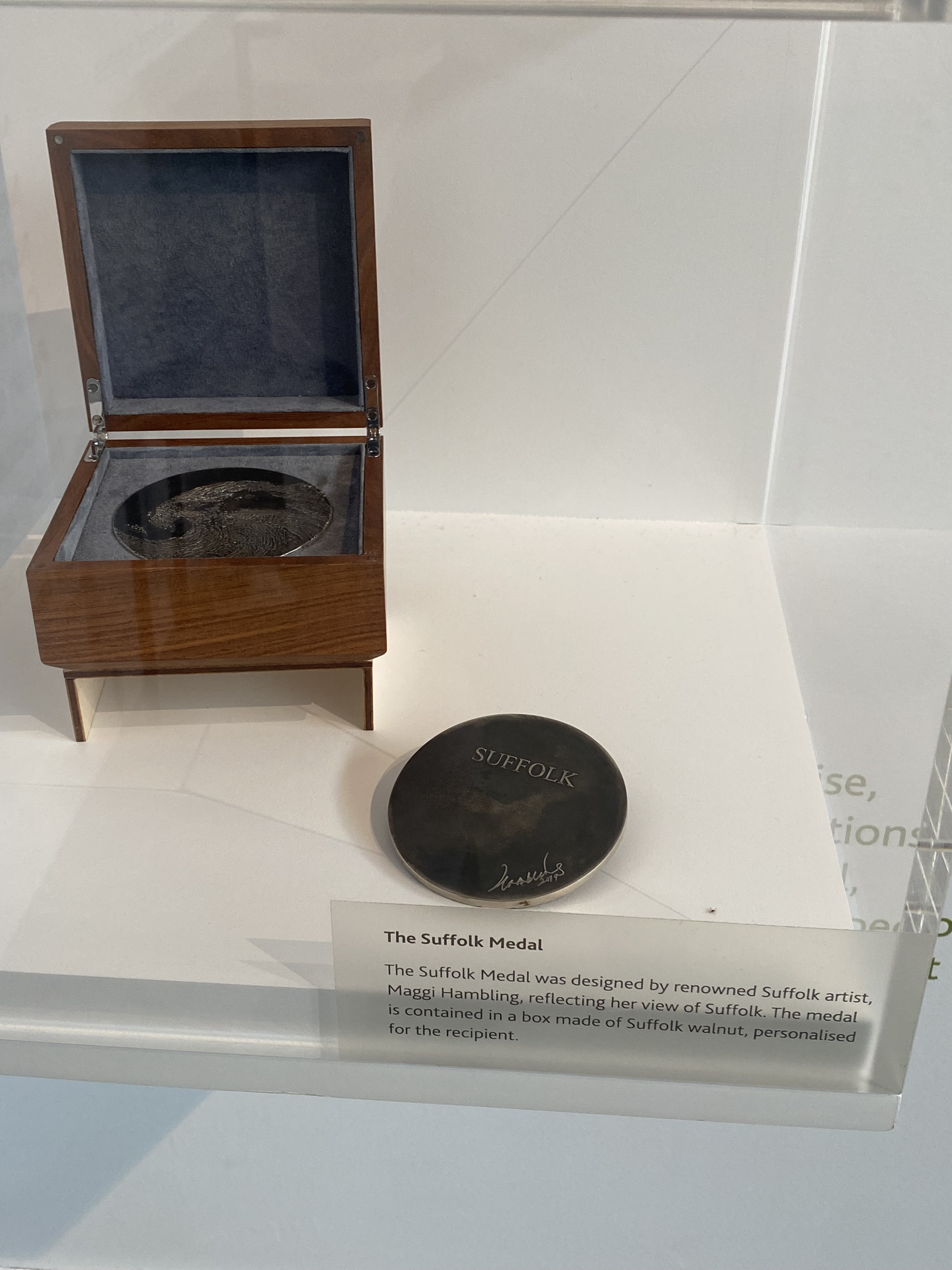
The Suffolk Medal on display at the Suffolk Archives, Ipswich

The Suffolk Medal was created by George Vestey, the High Sheriff of Suffolk in 2018.

Since 2019, the Suffolk Day ceremonies have presented the Suffolk Medal to recognise, reward and champion the exceptional contributions of Suffolk people that have made a fundamental and lasting difference to the county. The Suffolk Medal is presented by the Lord Lieutenant of Suffolk

The Medal was designed by notable Suffolk-based artist Maggi Hambling.

Notable recipients include:

- Maggi Hambling
- Martin Seeley
- Michael Laskey
