= Lincolnshire Day =

Anniversary of the Lincolnshire Rising

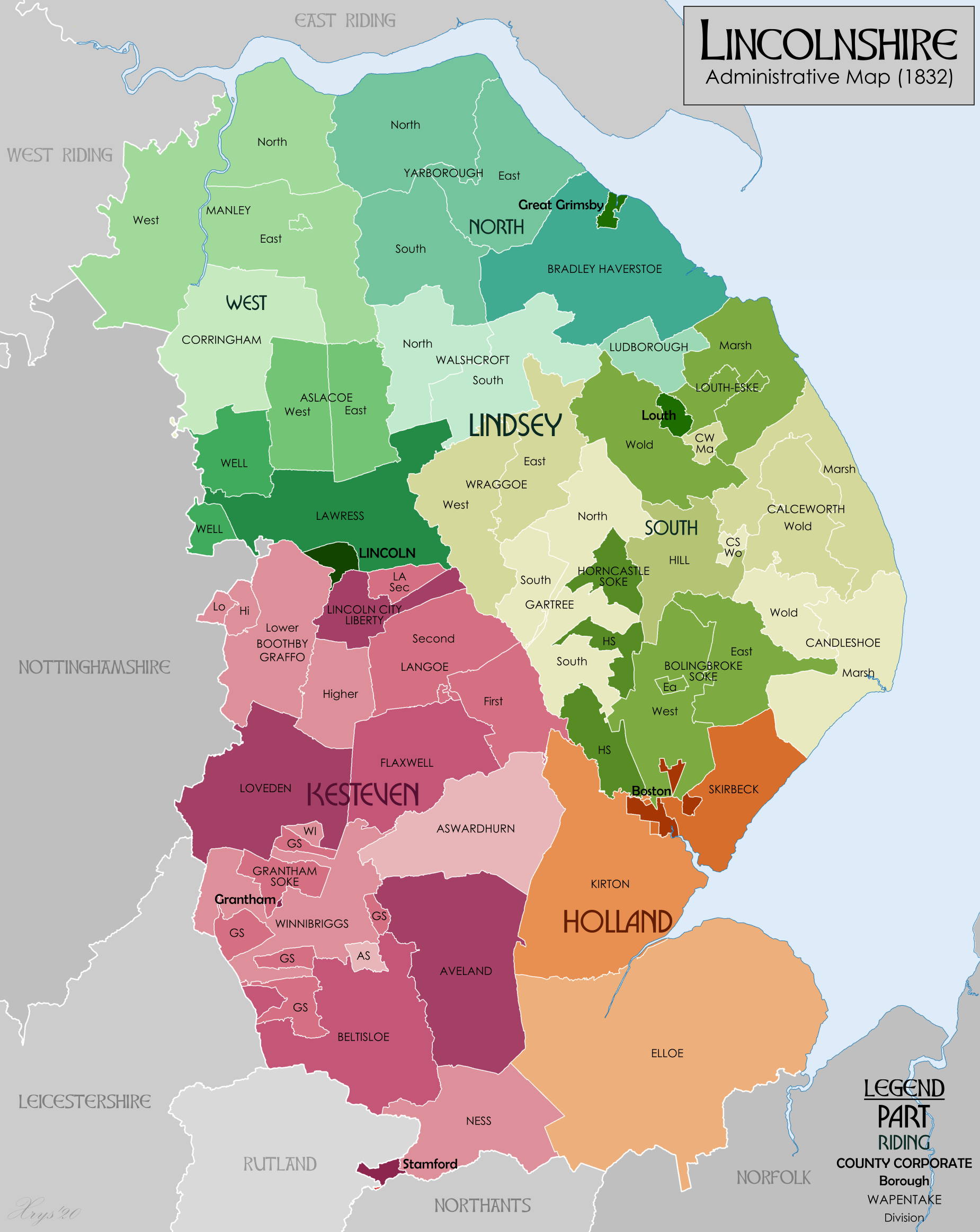
The county of Lincolnshire

Flag of the historic county of Lincolnshire

Location of Lincolnshire in England.

Lincolnshire Day is celebrated every year on 1 October and marks the anniversary of the Lincolnshire Rising, a revolt by Catholics against the establishment of the Church of England by Henry VIII in 1536.

The first official Lincolnshire Day was held in 2006 to commemorate the uprising. The date was voted for by readers of Lincolnshire Life magazine and BBC Radio Lincolnshire listeners.

The day aims to encourage local people, often known as yellowbellies, and those who have moved from the county to honour the historical event along with Lincolnshire's traditions, past and culture. Some people dress up in yellow to celebrate the day, while others hold local events and decorate their workplaces with Lincolnshire flags.

The home of Lincolnshire sausages, Batemans Brewery and Lincolnshire Poacher cheese to name a few, Lincolnshire remains a rural county renowned for its foods and drinks distributed locally and across the UK.

It is also home to the famous Red Arrows RAF display team, Lincoln Cathedral, the Lincolnshire Wolds and original copies of Magna Carta (1215) and Charter of the Forest (1217), the only place to hold copies of both.

Many famous people have come from the county, including Sir Isaac Newton – scientist, Alfred Lord Tennyson – Poet Laureate, Baroness Thatcher – Prime Minister, Matthew Flinders – explorer, Joseph Banks – explorer and botanist, George Boole – mathematician, Tony Jacklin CBE – golfer, Dame Joan Plowright – actress and Jim Broadbent – actor.

Lincolnshire Day is supported by county businesses and organisations including BBC Lincolnshire, Lincolnshire Co-operative, The Lincolnite, Lincolnshire Business, the Lincolnshire Echo, Lincolnshire Tourism, Lincoln Cathedral, Lincolnshire Life, Lincoln BIG, Tastes of Lincolnshire, Lincolnshire County Council, Shooting Star PR, POP Design and the Lincolnshire Sports Partnership.
