= Sussex Day =

Annual celebration in Sussex, England

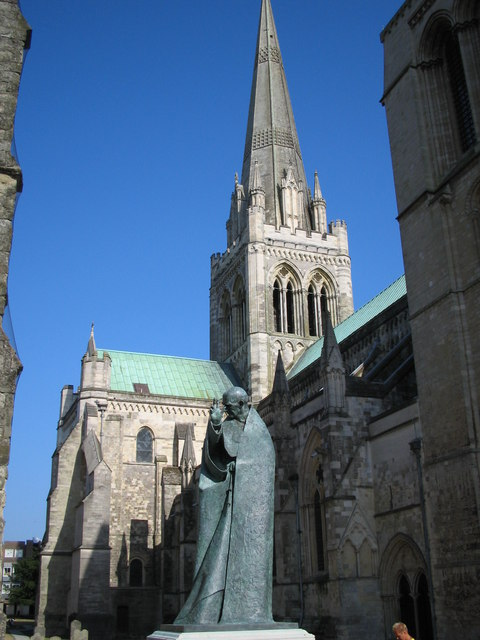
- Monument to St Richard of Chichester outside Chichester Cathedral
- Also called: St Richard's Day
- Observed by: Sussex
- Significance: Feast day of St Richard of Chichester as patron saint of Sussex
- Celebrations: Celebration and promotion of Sussex culture
- Date: 16 June
- Next time: 16 June 2027
- Frequency: Annual
- First time: 16 June 2007

Sussex Day is the county day for the historic county of Sussex in southern England and is celebrated on 16 June each year to celebrate the rich heritage and culture of Sussex.

The event takes place on St Richard's Day, the feast day of St Richard of Chichester, Sussex's patron saint. The date marks the anniversary of the translation of St Richard's body from its original burial place in the nave of Chichester Cathedral to an elaborate shrine at the cathedral on 16 June 1276.

== Significance ==
Sussex Day takes place on the feast day of St Richard, a medieval bishop of the diocese of Chichester, which covers Sussex. Henry III disagreed with Richard's election to the post of bishop and forbade anyone to house or feed Richard, who was forced to travel around Sussex entirely on foot. An ascetic and vegetarian, who refused to eat off silver, Richard was known for his strong stance on usurers ('loan sharks' in the modern vernacular), corrupt clergy and "priests who mumbled the Mass". Popular in Sussex, his tomb in Chichester became a place of pilgrimage and prayer through the later Middle Ages in particular.

== Origins ==
The idea of Sussex Day came from Worthing resident Ian Steedman who in 2006 suggested the idea to politician Henry Smith, at the time leader of West Sussex County Council. Smith liked the idea and West Sussex County Council officially recognised the day in 2007.

== Celebrations ==
Since 2013, the Sussex Flag is flown in each of the six ancient Rapes, or sub-divisions of Sussex in the week running up to Sussex Day. The Sussex Martlets flag was hoisted over the Council House in Chichester, from Maltravers Street in Arundel, from St Nicholas’ Church in Bramber, from Lewes Castle, from St Nicholas’ Church in Pevensey, and from Hastings Castle; each representing their respective historic division of Sussex. The flag of St Richard is also flown on Sussex Day.

Several other towns and villages across the county raise the Sussex Flag on 16 June, including Peacehaven, Seaford, Newhaven, Shoreham and Worthing. The West Sussex villages of Slindon and Milland also fly the flag. In Milland it is the West Sussex flag perhaps indicative that Milland only began to emerge in mid 20th Century with the civil parish formed in 1972.

At Newhaven and Petworth, the Sussex Charter is read out and "Sussex by the Sea", Sussex's unofficial county anthem, is sung. Events to celebrate Sussex culture often take place, as does enjoyment of Sussex food and drink, including Sussex beer and Sussex wine. In 2013, at the Weald and Downland Open Air Museum in Singleton, an event took place celebrating Sussex culture including Sussex's buildings, stoolball, Sussex literature and history, as well as traditional Sussex music and food from Sussex.

== Sussex Charter ==
On Sussex Day, readings of the Sussex Charter have taken place at some towns in Sussex, including Crowborough, Heathfield, Newhaven and Petworth.

For all the people of the ancient kingdom of Sussex!

Let it be known: the 16 June of each and every year shall be known as Sussex Day.

Sussex day shall be celebrated according to the rites and traditions of Sussex.

Let it be known all the people of Sussex shall be responsible for the maintenance of those boundaries that join to those of our neighbours.

Let it be known all the people of Sussex shall be responsible for all the environs within those boundaries.

Let it be known, the people of Sussex shall recognise the inshore waters that lie inside a line drawn from Beachy Head, and extending to Selsey Bill as being, the Bay of Sussex.

Let it be known, the people of Sussex will undertake responsibility for the general well being of our neighbours.

Let it be known the people of Sussex shall be guardians of our wildlife.

Let it be known the people of Sussex will, through custom support all local business.

Finally, let it be known, as guardians of Sussex, we all know Sussex is Sussex … and Sussex won’t be druv!

In God we trust.

God Save the King!

== Sussex 1550 ==
2027 sees the 1,550th anniversary since the Kingdom of Sussex was traditionally founded, in the year 477, by King Ælle and his three sons, who landed at Cymenshore according to the Anglo-Saxon Chronicle.

To mark this milestone, festivities are being organised, as part of ‘Sussex 1550’ celebrations, on and around Sussex Day, Wednesday 16th June 2027. Included, as part of these observances, is the synchronised lighting of beacons and bonfires across the historic county, at 9pm, on Sussex Day 2027.

== See also ==
- Culture of Sussex
- List of county days in England
