= Kingdom of England =

Sovereign state in Europe before 1707

Kingdom of England: Ænglalonde rīċe (Old English); Realme d'Engleterre (Anglo-Norman); Kingdom of Engelond (Middle English); Regnum Angliæ (Latin); Teyrnas Lloegr (Welsh)
- 927–1707 (1649–1660: Commonwealth)
- Top: Flag (from the 16th century); Bottom: Royal Banner (1406–1603); Royal Arms (1558-1603)
- Motto: "Dieu et mon droit" (French) "God and my right" (from the 15th century)
- Location of the Kingdom, 1558–1707 (green)

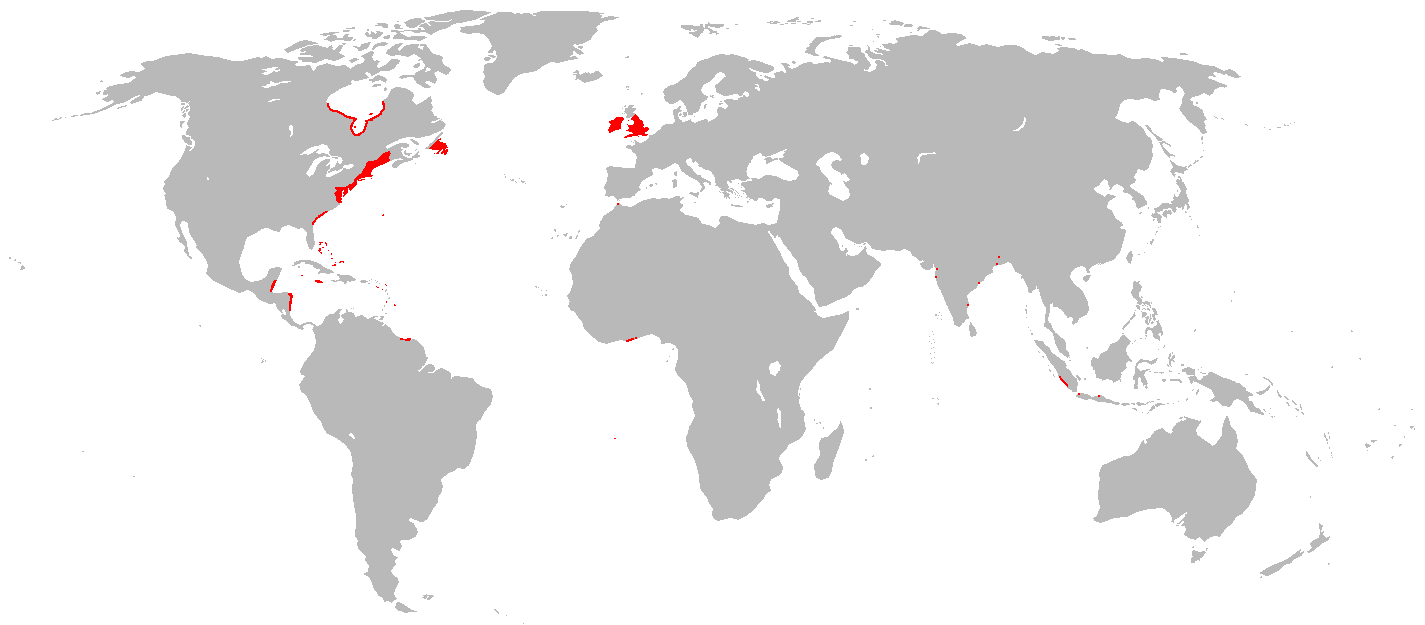
- English overseas possessions in 1700
- Capital: Winchester (927–1066); London (1066–1707)
- Official languages: English; Anglo-Norman French (1066–1707); Latin
- Regional languages: Cornish; Cumbric (until the 12th century); Welsh
- Religion: Roman Catholicism (c. 6th century–1534; 1553–1558); Anglicanism (1534–1553; 1558–1707)
- Demonym: English
- Government: Elective monarchy (927–1066); Feudal hereditary monarchy (1066–1295); Parliamentary constitutional monarchy (1295–1649; 1660–1707)
- Monarch
  - 927–939 (first): Æthelstan
  - 1702–1707 (last): Anne
- Legislature: Parliament
  - Upper house: House of Lords
  - Lower house: House of Commons
- History
  - Unification of the Angles, Saxons and Danes: 12 July 927
  - Battle of Hastings: 14 October 1066
  - Anglo-Norman invasion of Ireland: May 1169 – May 1177
  - Magna Carta: 15 June 1215
  - Model Parliament: 13 November 1295
  - Annexation of Wales: 1535–1542
  - Union of the Crowns: 24 March 1603
  - Glorious Revolution: 11 December 1688
  - Union with Scotland: 30 April/11 May (Note: According to the Julian calendar, the Kingdom of England was abolished on 30 April 1707, but according to the Gregorian calendar on 11 May 1707.) 1707
- Currency: Pound sterling
Preceded by	Succeeded by
Kingdom of Wessex; Principality of Wales	Kingdom of Great Britain
- Today part of: United Kingdom; England; Wales; Scotland (Lothian and the Scottish Borders; partially)

The Kingdom of England was a sovereign state on the island of Great Britain from 12 July 927, when all of the Anglo-Saxon kingdoms were united under the rule of Æthelstan, until May 1707, when it relinquished its sovereignty along with Scotland to form the Kingdom of Great Britain, which would later become the United Kingdom. The Kingdom of England was among the most powerful states in Europe during the medieval and early modern periods.

The political unification of England was a complex process that took place over many decades. Beginning in the year 886, Alfred the Great took London from the Danes and adopted the title King of the Anglo-Saxons in order to reflect his control over both Wessex and western Mercia. This style would go on to be inherited by his son, Edward the Elder (reigned 899–924), and grandson, Æthelstan, both of whom greatly expanded the authority of the House of Wessex during their respective reigns. In 927, Æthelstan conquered the last remaining Viking kingdom, York, thereby making him the first Anglo-Saxon ruler of the whole of England and the founder of the Kingdom of the English. In 1016, the kingdom became part of the North Sea Empire of Cnut the Great, a personal union between England, Denmark and Norway. The Norman Conquest in 1066 led to the transfer of the English capital city and chief royal residence from the Anglo-Saxon one at Winchester to Westminster, and the City of London quickly established itself as England's largest and principal commercial centre.

Histories of the Kingdom of England from the Norman Conquest of 1066 conventionally distinguish periods named after successive ruling dynasties: Norman/Angevin 1066–1216, Plantagenet 1216–1485, Tudor 1485–1603 and Stuart 1603–1707 (interrupted by the Interregnum of 1649–1660).

All English monarchs after 1066 ultimately descend from the Normans, and the distinction of the Plantagenets is conventional—beginning with Henry II (reigned 1154–1189) as from that time, the Angevin kings became "more English in nature"; the houses of Lancaster and York are both Plantagenet cadet branches, the Tudor dynasty claimed descent from Edward III via John Beaufort and James VI and I of the House of Stuart claimed descent from Henry VII via Margaret Tudor.

The completion of the conquest of Wales by Edward I in 1284 put Wales under the control of the English crown. Edward III (reigned 1327–1377) transformed the Kingdom of England into one of the most formidable military powers in Europe; his reign also saw vital developments in legislation and government—in particular the evolution of the English Parliament. From the 1340s, English claims to the French throne were held in pretense, but after the Hundred Years' War and the outbreak of the Wars of the Roses in 1455, the English were no longer in any position to pursue their French claims and lost all their land on the continent, except for Calais. After the turmoils of the Wars of the Roses, the Tudor dynasty ruled during the English Renaissance and again extended English monarchical power beyond England proper, achieving the full union of England and the Principality of Wales under the Laws in Wales Acts 1535–1542. Henry VIII oversaw the English Reformation, and his daughter Elizabeth I (reigned 1558–1603) the Elizabethan Religious Settlement, meanwhile establishing England as a great power.

The accession of James VI and I in 1603 resulted in the Union of the Crowns, with the Stuart dynasty ruling the kingdoms of England, Scotland and Ireland. James’s reign saw the first foundations of the British Empire via colonization of the Americas, beginning with Virginia in 1607. Under the Stuarts, England plunged into civil war, which culminated in the execution of Charles I in 1649. The monarchy returned in 1660, but the Civil War had established the precedent that an English monarch cannot govern without the consent of Parliament. This concept became legally established as part of the Glorious Revolution of 1688. From this time the kingdom of England, as well as its successor state the United Kingdom, functioned in effect as a constitutional monarchy. (Note: The Constitution of the United Kingdom is uncodified.) On 1 May 1707 (Note: According to the Gregorian calendar, the Acts of Union 1707 took effect on 12 May 1707.), under the terms of the Acts of Union 1707, the parliaments, and therefore Kingdoms, of both England and Scotland were mutually abolished. Their assets and estates united 'for ever, into the Kingdom by the name of Great Britain', forming the Kingdom of Great Britain and the Parliament of Great Britain.

== Name ==
The Anglo-Saxons referred to themselves as the Engle or the Angelcynn, originally names of the Angles. They called their land Engla land, meaning "land of the English", by Æthelweard Latinized Anglia, from an original Anglia vetus, the purported homeland of the Angles (called Angulus by Bede). The name Engla land became England by haplology during the Middle English period (Engle-land, Engelond). The Latin name was Anglia or Anglorum terra, the Old French and Anglo-Norman one Engleterre.

The standard title for monarchs from Æthelstan until John was Rex Anglorum ("King of the English"). Cnut, a Dane, was the first to call himself "King of England". During the Norman period Rex Anglorum remained standard, with occasional use of Rex Anglie ("King of England"). From John's reign onwards all other titles were eschewed in favour of Rex or Regina Anglie. In 1604 James I, who had inherited the English throne the previous year, adopted the title (now usually rendered in English rather than Latin) King of Great Britain. (Note: English and Scot, James insisted, should "join and coalesce together in a sincere and perfect union, as two twins bred in one belly, to love one another as no more two but one estate".)

== History ==
=== Anglo-Saxon England ===
Southern Britain in AD 600 after the Anglo-Saxon settlement, showing England's division into multiple petty kingdoms

The Kingdom of England emerged from the gradual unification of the early medieval Anglo-Saxon kingdoms known as the Heptarchy: East Anglia, Mercia, Northumbria, Kent, Essex, Sussex, and Wessex. The Viking invasions of the 9th century upset the balance of power between the English kingdoms, and native Anglo-Saxon life in general. The English lands were unified in the 10th century in a reconquest completed by 927.

During the Heptarchy, the most powerful king among the Anglo-Saxon kingdoms might become acknowledged as Bretwalda, a high king over the other kings. The decline of Mercia allowed Wessex to become more powerful, absorbing the kingdoms of Kent and Sussex in 825. The kings of Wessex increasingly dominated the other kingdoms of England during the 9th century. In 827, Northumbria submitted to Egbert of Wessex at Dore, briefly making Egbert the first king to reign over a united England.

In 886, Alfred the Great retook London, which he apparently regarded as a turning point in his reign. The Anglo-Saxon Chronicle says that "all of the English people (all Angelcyn) not subject to the Danes submitted themselves to King Alfred." Asser added that "Alfred, king of the Anglo-Saxons, restored the city of London splendidly ... and made it habitable once more." Alfred's restoration entailed reoccupying and refurbishing the nearly deserted Roman walled city, building quays along the Thames, and laying a new city street plan.

On 12 July 927 the monarchs of Britain gathered at Eamont Bridge, now in Cumbria, to recognise Æthelstan as king of the English. The title "King of the English" or Rex Anglorum in Latin, was first used to describe Æthelstan in one of his charters in 928. The standard title for monarchs from Æthelstan until John was "King of the English". During the following years Northumbria repeatedly changed hands between the English kings and the Norwegian invaders, but was definitively brought under English control by Eadred in 954, completing the unification of England. In 1018, Lothian, a portion of the northern half of Northumbria Bernicia was ceded to the Kingdom of Scotland.

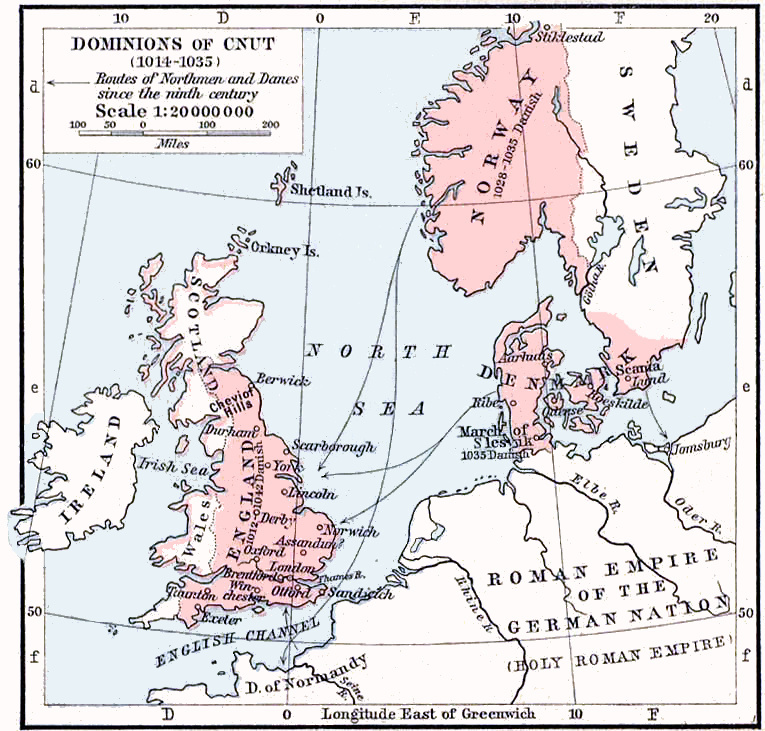
The dominions of Cnut (1014–1035)

England has remained in political unity ever since. During the reign of Æthelred the Unready (978–1016), a new wave of Danish invasions was orchestrated by Swein Forkbeard, King of Denmark, culminating after a quarter-century of warfare in the Danish conquest of England in 1013. But Sweyn died on 2 February 1014, and Æthelred was restored to the throne. In 1015, Sweyn's son Cnut (commonly known as Canute) launched a new invasion. The ensuing war ended with an agreement in 1016 between Canute and Æthelred's successor, Edmund Ironside, to divide England between them, but Edmund's death on 30 November of that year left England united under Danish rule. This continued for 26 years until the death of Harthacnut in June 1042. He was the son of Canute and Emma of Normandy (the widow of Æthelred the Unready) and had no heirs of his own; he was succeeded by his half-brother, Æthelred's son, Edward the Confessor.

=== Norman Conquest ===
The peace lasted until the death of the childless Edward in January 1066. His brother-in-law was crowned King Harold, but his cousin William the Bastard, Duke of Normandy, immediately claimed the throne for himself. William launched an invasion of England and landed in Sussex on 28 September 1066. Harold and his army were in York, following their victory against the Norwegians at the Battle of Stamford Bridge (25 September 1066), when the news reached him. He decided to set out without delay and confront the Norman army in Sussex so marched southwards at once, despite the army not being properly rested following the battle with the Norwegians. The armies of Harold and William faced each other at the Battle of Hastings (14 October 1066), in which the English army, or Fyrd, was defeated, Harold and his two brothers were slain, and William emerged as victor. William was then able to conquer England with little further opposition. He was not, however, planning to absorb the Kingdom into the Duchy of Normandy. As a mere duke, William owed allegiance to Philip I of France, whereas in the independent Kingdom of England he could rule without interference. He was crowned on 25 December 1066 in Westminster Abbey, London.

=== High Middle Ages ===
In 1092, William II led an invasion of Strathclyde, a Celtic kingdom in what is now southwest Scotland and Cumbria. In doing so, he annexed what is now the county of Cumbria to England. In 1124, Henry I ceded what is now southeast Scotland (called Lothian) to the Kingdom of Scotland, in return for the King of Scotland's loyalty. This final cession established what would become the traditional borders of England which have remained largely unchanged since then (except for occasional and temporary changes). This area of land had previously been a part of the Anglian Kingdom of Northumbria. Lothian contained what later became the Scottish capital, Edinburgh. This arrangement was later finalized in 1237 by the Treaty of York.

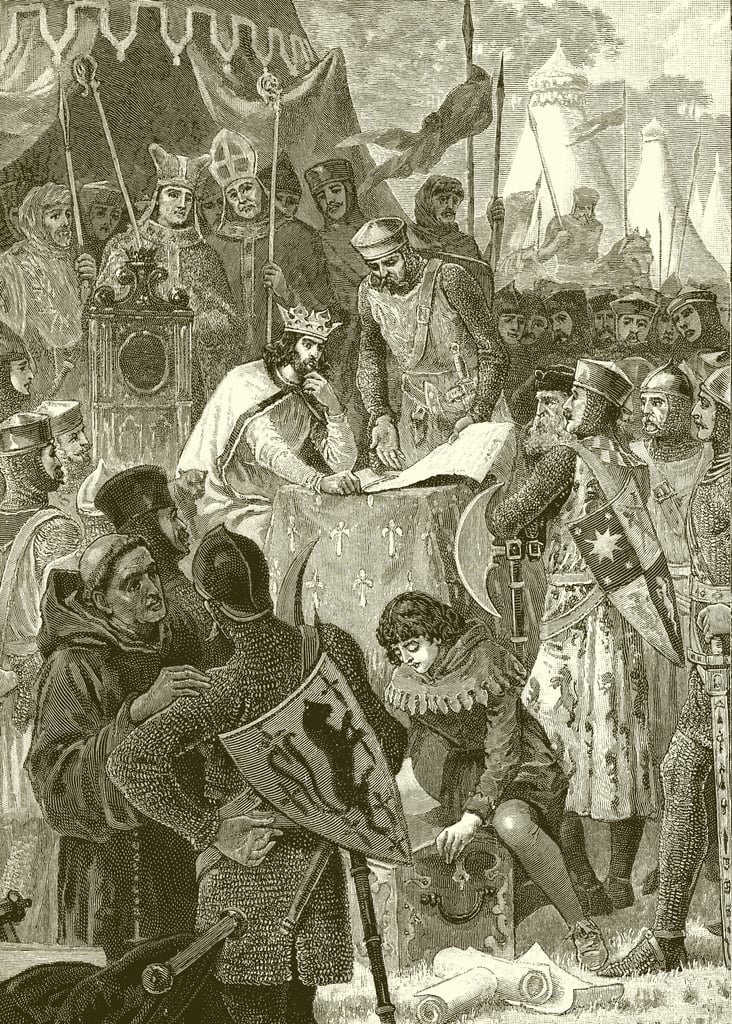
King John signs Magna Carta at Runnymede in 1215, surrounded by his baronage. Illustration from Cassell's History of England, 1902.

The Anglo-Norman invasion of Ireland took place during the late 12th century, when Anglo-Normans gradually conquered and acquired large swathes of land from the Irish, over which England then claimed sovereignty, all allegedly sanctioned by the Papal bull Laudabiliter. At the time, Gaelic Ireland was made up of several kingdoms, with a High King claiming lordship over most of the other kings.

The Duchy of Aquitaine came into personal union with England upon the accession of Henry II, who had married Eleanor, Duchess of Aquitaine. They remained united until John Lackland, Henry II's son and fourth-generation descendant of William the Conqueror, lost the continental possessions to Philip II of France decisively after the Battle of Bouvines in 1214. A few remnants of Normandy, including the Channel Islands, remained in John's possession, together with most of the Duchy of Aquitaine.

==== Conquest of Wales ====
Up until the Norman Conquest of England, Wales had remained for the most part independent of the Anglo-Saxon kingdoms, although some Welsh kings did sometimes acknowledge the Bretwalda. Soon after the Norman Conquest of England, however, some Norman lords began to attack Wales. They conquered and ruled parts of it, acknowledging the overlordship of the Norman kings of England but with considerable local independence. Over many years these "Marcher Lords" conquered more and more of Wales, against considerable resistance led by various Welsh princes, who also often acknowledged the overlordship of the Norman kings of England.

Edward I defeated Llywelyn ap Gruffudd and his brother, Dafydd ap Gruffudd, and so effectively conquered Wales, in 1282. He created the title Prince of Wales for his heir, the future Edward II, in 1301. Edward I's conquest was brutal and the subsequent repression considerable, as the magnificent Welsh castles such as Conwy, Harlech, and Caernarfon attest.

=== Late Middle Ages ===
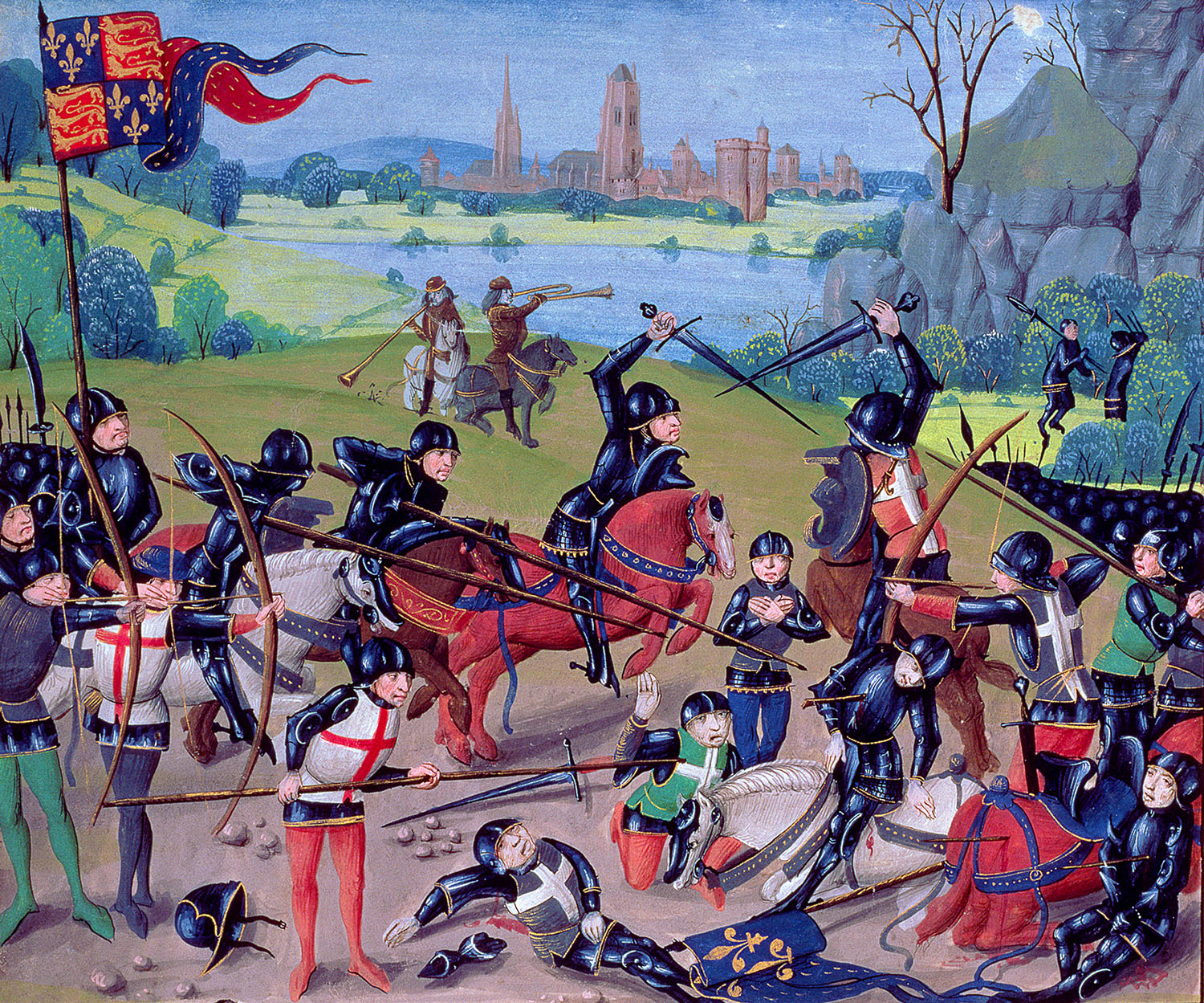
Fifteenth-century miniature depicting the English victory over France at the Battle of Agincourt

Edward III was the first English king to have a claim to the throne of France. His pursuit of the claim resulted in the Hundred Years' War (1337–1453), which pitted five kings of England of the House of Plantagenet against five kings of France of the Capetian House of Valois. Extensive naval raiding was carried out by all sides during the war, often involving privateers such as John Hawley of Dartmouth or the Castilian Pero Niño. Though the English won numerous victories, they were unable to overcome the French's numerical superiority and their strategic use of gunpowder weapons. England was defeated at the Battle of Formigny in 1450 and finally at the Battle of Castillon in 1453, retaining only a single town in France, Calais.

During the Hundred Years' War an English identity began to develop in place of the previous division between the Norman lords and their Anglo-Saxon subjects. This was a consequence of sustained hostility to the increasingly nationalist French, whose kings and other leaders (notably the charismatic Joan of Arc) used a developing sense of French identity to help draw people to their cause.

The kingdom had little time to recover before entering the Wars of the Roses (1455–1487), a series of civil wars over possession of the throne between the House of Lancaster (whose heraldic symbol was the red rose) and the House of York (whose symbol was the white rose), each led by different branches of the descendants of Edward III. The end of these wars found the throne held by the descendant of an initially illegitimate member of the House of Lancaster, married to the eldest daughter of the House of York: Henry VII and Elizabeth of York.

=== Tudor period ===
Wales retained a separate legal and administrative system, which had been established by Edward I in the late 13th century. The country was divided between the Marcher Lords, who gave feudal allegiance to the crown, and the Principality of Wales. Under the Tudor monarchy, Henry VIII replaced the laws of Wales with those of England (under the Laws in Wales Acts 1535–1542). Wales was incorporated into England, and henceforth was represented in the Parliament.

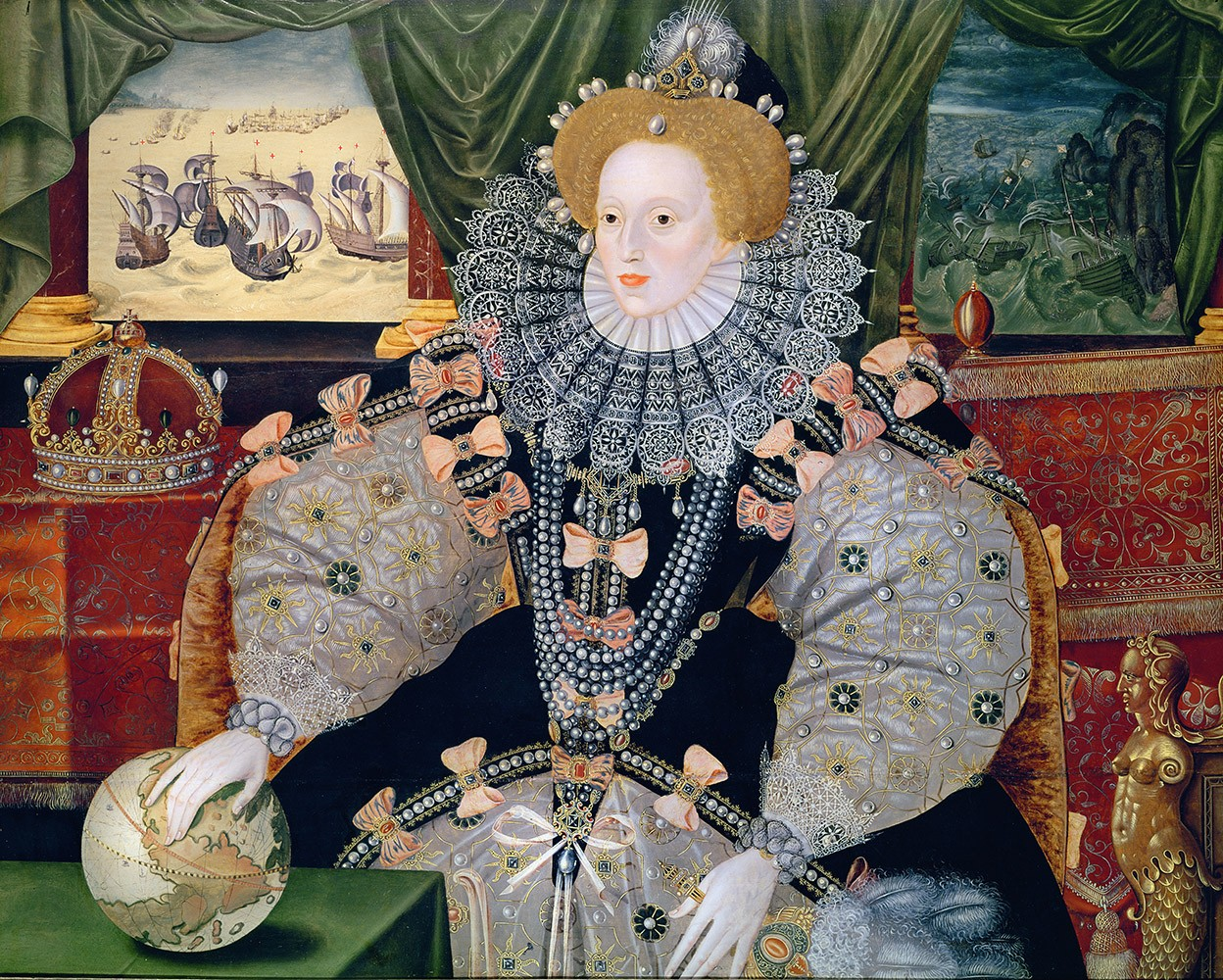
Portrait of Elizabeth I made to commemorate the defeat of the Spanish Armada (1588), depicted in the background. Elizabeth's international power is symbolised by the hand resting on the globe.

During the 1530s, Henry overthrew the power of the Catholic Church within the kingdom, replacing the pope as head of his own English Church and seizing the Catholic Church's lands, thereby facilitating the creation of a variation of Catholicism that became more Protestant over time. This aligned England with Scotland, which also gradually adopted a Protestant religion, whereas the most important continental powers, France and Spain, remained Catholic.

The "Tudor conquest" (or reconquest) of Ireland' took place under the Tudor dynasty. Following a failed rebellion against the crown by Silken Thomas, the Earl of Kildare, in the 1530s, Henry VIII was declared King of Ireland in 1542 by statute of the Parliament of Ireland, with the aim of restoring such central authority as had been lost throughout the country during the previous two centuries.

Calais, the last remaining continental possession of the Kingdom, was lost in 1558, during the reign of Philip and Mary I. Their successor, Elizabeth I, consolidated the new and increasingly Protestant Church of England. She also began to build up the kingdom's naval strength, on the foundations Henry VIII had laid down. By 1588, her new navy was strong enough to defeat the Spanish Armada, which had sought to invade England to halt English support for the Dutch rebels and to put a Catholic monarch on the throne in her place.

=== Early modern history ===
The House of Tudor ended with the death of Elizabeth I on 24 March 1603. James I ascended the throne of England and brought it into personal union with the Kingdom of Scotland. Despite the Union of the Crowns, the kingdoms remained separate and independent states: a state of affairs which lasted for more than a century.

==== Civil War and Interregnum ====
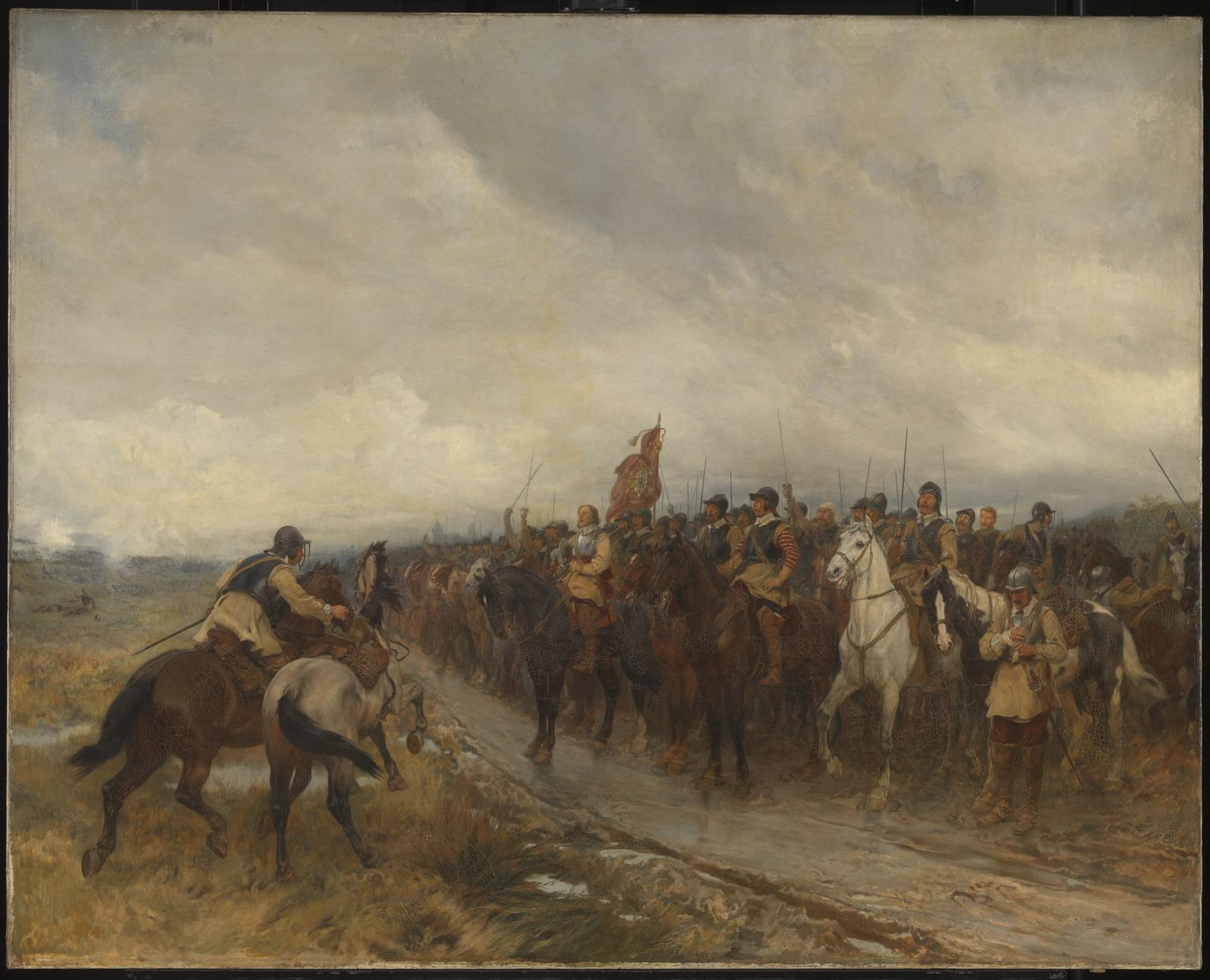
Cromwell at Dunbar. Oliver Cromwell united the whole of the British Isles by force and created the Commonwealth of England.

The Stuart kings overestimated the power of the English monarchy, and were cast down by Parliament in 1645 and 1688. In the first instance, Charles I's introduction of new forms of taxation in defiance of Parliament led to the English Civil War (1641–1645), in which the king was defeated, and to the abolition of the monarchy under Oliver Cromwell during the Interregnum of 1649–1660.

After the trial and execution of Charles I in January 1649, the Rump Parliament passed an act declaring England to be a Commonwealth on 19 May 1649. The monarchy and the House of Lords were abolished, and so the House of Commons became a unitary legislative chamber with a new body, the Council of State becoming the executive. However the Army remained the dominant institution in the new republic and the most prominent general was Oliver Cromwell. The Commonwealth fought wars in Ireland and Scotland which were subdued and placed under Commonwealth military occupation.

Meanwhile, relations with the Dutch Republic had deteriorated. Despite initial English support during the Dutch War of Independence against the Spanish, tensions arose as the Dutch Republic emerged as England's principal commercial and naval rival. By the mid-17th century, it had become the foremost trading nation. In response the English, alarmed by their waning competitiveness, implemented stricter trading policies to curb Dutch dominance. The First Anglo-Dutch War which followed, however, failed to resolve the commercial issues.

In April 1653 Cromwell and the other Grandees of the New Model Army, frustrated with the members of the Rump Parliament who would not pass legislation to dissolve the Rump and to allow a new more representative parliament to be elected, stopped the Rump's session and declared the Rump dissolved.

After an experiment with a Nominated Assembly (Barebone's Parliament), the Grandees in the Army, through the Council of State imposed a new constitutional arrangement under a written constitution called the Instrument of Government. Under the Instrument of Government executive power lay with a Lord Protector (an office to be held for the life of the incumbent) and there were to be triennial Parliaments, with each sitting for at least five months. Article 23 of the Instrument of Government stated that Oliver Cromwell was to be the first Lord Protector. The Instrument of Government was replaced by a second constitution (the Humble Petition and Advice) under which the Lord Protector could nominate his successor. Cromwell nominated his son Richard who became Lord Protector on the death of Oliver on 3 September 1658.

==== Restoration and Glorious Revolution ====
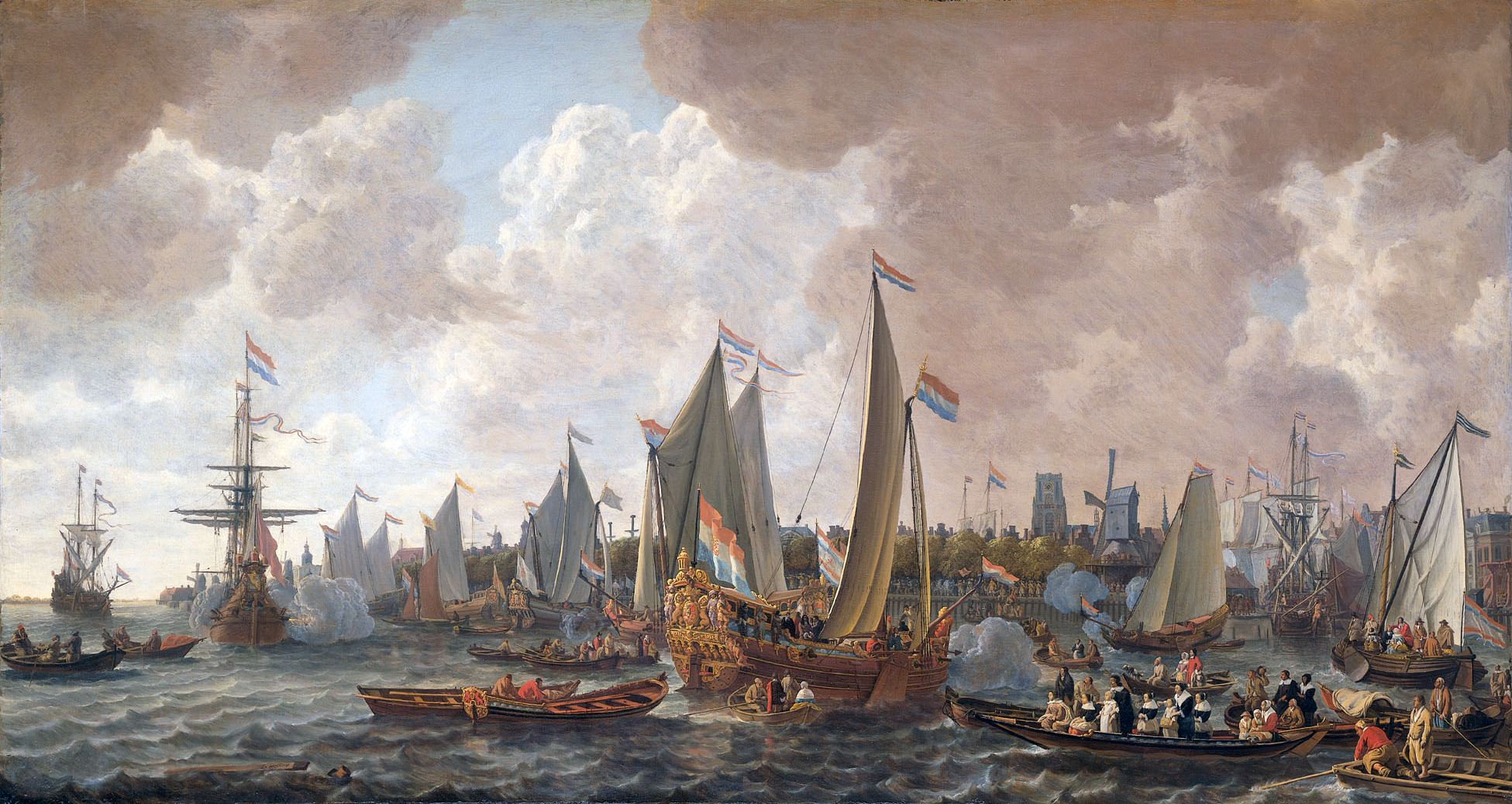
Charles sailed from his exile in the Netherlands to his restoration in England in May 1660. Painting by Lieve Verschuier.

Richard proved to be ineffectual and was unable to maintain his rule. He resigned his title and retired into obscurity. The Rump Parliament was recalled and there was a second period where the executive power lay with the Council of state. But this restoration of Commonwealth rule, similar to that before the Protectorate, proved to be unstable, and the exiled claimant, Charles II, was restored to the throne in 1660.

In 1665 the unresolved commercial issues with the Dutch led to the Second Anglo-Dutch War, which culminated in the disastrous Raid on the Medway and forced the humiliated Charles in to an unfavourable peace treaty. The treaty eliminated a number of long-standing issues, and in the long-term made it possible for the two countries to unite against the expansionist policies pursued by Louis XIV of France. In the short-term however, Charles' desire to avenge this setback led to the Third Anglo-Dutch War in 1672. Despite attaining French support this time, Dutch naval successes made Parliament unwilling to support Charles' war effort any further, and he was again forced to make peace.

Following the Restoration of the monarchy in 1660, an attempt by James II to reintroduce Roman Catholicism—a century after its suppression by the Tudors—led to the Glorious Revolution of 1688, in which he was overthrown after an invasion by the Dutch prince William of Orange, whose Dutch forces occupied London. William and his wife Mary II were subsequently crowned by Parliament. William reoriented England's foreign policy to support the Dutch Republic in its wars against Louis XIV of France. (Note: See the Nine Years' War and War of the Spanish Succession.)

==== Union with Scotland ====
In the Scottish case, the attractions were partly financial and partly to do with removing English trade sanctions put in place through the Alien Act 1705. The English were more anxious about the royal succession. The death of William III in 1702 had led to the accession of his sister-in-law Anne to the thrones of England and Scotland, but her only surviving child had died in 1700, and the English Act of Settlement 1701 had given the succession to the English crown to the Protestant House of Hanover. Securing the same succession in Scotland became the primary object of English strategic thinking towards Scotland. By 1704, the Union of the Crowns was in crisis, with the Scottish Act of Security allowing for the Scottish Parliament to choose a different monarch, which could in turn lead to an independent foreign policy during a major European war.

A Treaty of Union was agreed on 22 July 1706, and following the Acts of Union of 1707, which created the Kingdom of Great Britain, the independence of the kingdoms of England and Scotland came to an end on 1 May 1707. The Acts of Union created a customs union and monetary union and provided that any "laws and statutes" that were "contrary to or inconsistent with the terms" of the Acts would "cease and become void".

The English and Scottish Parliaments were merged into the Parliament of Great Britain, located in Westminster, London. At this point England ceased to exist as a separate political entity, and since then has had no national government. The laws of England were unaffected, with the legal jurisdiction continuing to be that of England and Wales, while Scotland continued to have its own laws and law courts. This continued after the 1801 union between the kingdoms of Great Britain and Ireland, forming the United Kingdom of Great Britain and Ireland. In 1922 the Irish Free State seceded from the United Kingdom, leading to the latter being renamed the United Kingdom of Great Britain and Northern Ireland.

== Government ==
=== Territorial divisions ===
The counties of England were established for administration by the Normans, in most cases based on earlier shires established by the Anglo-Saxons. They ceased to be used for administration only with the creation of the administrative counties in 1889.

Unlike the partly self-governing boroughs that covered urban areas, the counties of medieval England existed primarily as a means of enforcing central government power, enabling monarchs to exercise control over local areas through their chosen representatives – originally sheriffs and later the lord-lieutenants – and their subordinate justices of the peace. Counties were used initially for the administration of justice, collection of taxes and organisation of the military, and later for local government and electing parliamentary representation. Some outlying counties were from time to time accorded palatine status with some military and central government functions vested in a local noble or bishop. The last such, the County Palatine of Durham, did not lose this special status until the 19th century.

Although all of England was divided into shires by the time of the Norman Conquest, some counties were formed considerably later, up to the 16th century. Because of their differing origins the counties varied considerably in size. The county boundaries were fairly static between the 16th century Laws in Wales acts and the Local Government Act 1888. Each shire was responsible for gathering taxes for the central government; for local defence; and for justice, through assize courts.

The power of the feudal barons to control their landholding was considerably weakened in 1290 by the statute of Quia Emptores. Feudal baronies became perhaps obsolete (but not extinct) on the abolition of feudal tenure during the Civil War, as confirmed by the Tenures Abolition Act 1660 passed under the Restoration which took away knight-service and other legal rights. Tenure by knight-service was abolished and discharged and the lands covered by such tenures, including once-feudal baronies, were henceforth held by socage (i.e., in exchange for monetary rents). The English Fitzwalter Case in 1670 ruled that barony by tenure had been discontinued for many years and any claims to a peerage on such basis, meaning a right to sit in the House of Lords, were not to be revived, nor any right of succession based on them.

The Statute of Rhuddlan in 1284 followed the conquest of Wales by Edward I. It assumed the lands held by the Princes of Gwynedd under the title "Prince of Wales" as legally part of the lands of England, and established shire counties on the English model over those areas. The Marcher Lords were progressively tied to the English kings by the grants of lands and lordships in England. The Council of Wales and the Marches, administered from Ludlow Castle, was initially established by Edward IV of England to govern the lands held under the Principality of Wales in 1472.

At the same time the Council of Wales was created in 1472, a Council of the North was set up for the northern counties of England. After falling into disuse, it was re-established in 1537 and abolished in 1641. A very short-lived Council of the West also existed for the West Country between 1537 and 1540.

=== Taxation ===
In the Anglo-Saxon period, the geld or property tax was first levied in response to Danish invasions but later became a regular tax. The majority of the king's income derived from the royal demesne and the annual "farm" from each shire (the fixed sum paid by sheriffs for the privilege of administering and profiting from royal lands). Kings also made income from judicial fines and regulation of trade. People owed the king service in the form of the trinoda necessitas—fyrd service, burh building, and bridge building.

After the Conquest of 1066, the Normans continued collecting the geld regularly. They also introduced new sources of revenue based on concepts of feudalism. The king was entitled to collect a feudal aid when his eldest son was knighted, his eldest daughter married, or if the king needed to pay his own ransom. The heir to a fief was also required to pay the king a feudal relief before he could take possession of his inheritance. The king was also entitled to his vassals military service, but vassals could pay scutage instead.

=== Military ===
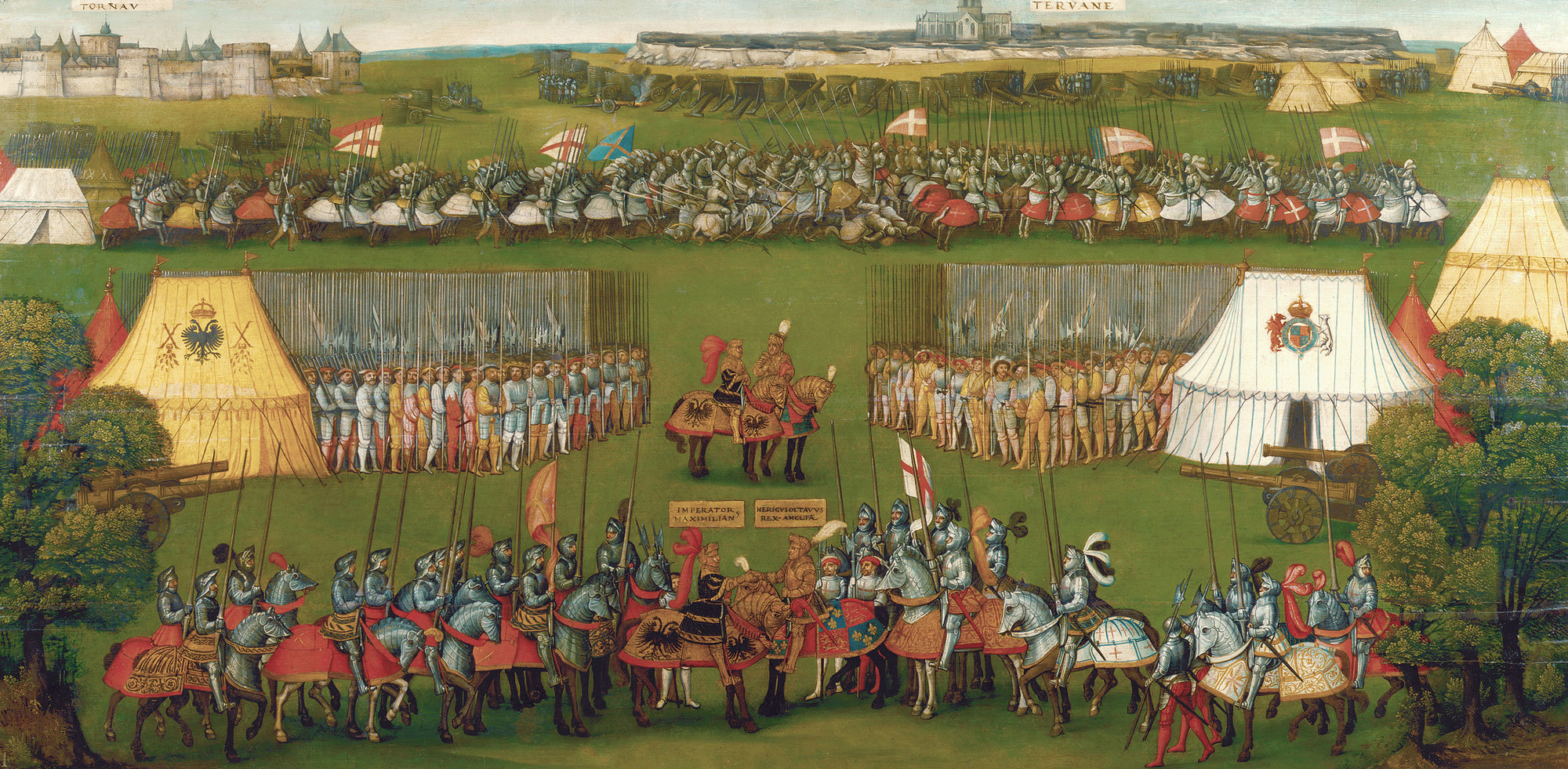
Flemish painting showing the encounter between Henry VIII and Emperor Maximilian I in 1513. In the background is depicted the Battle of the Spurs against Louis XII of France.

In the Anglo-Saxon period, England had no standing army. The king and magnates retained professional household troops (see housecarl), and all free men were obligated to perform military service in the fyrd. In addition, holders of bookland were obligated to provide a certain number of men based on the number of hides they owned.

After the Norman Conquest, the king's household troops remained central to any royal army. The Anglo-Saxon fyrd also remained in use. But the Normans also introduced a new feudal element to the English military. The king's tenants-in-chief (his feudal barons) were obligated to provide mounted knights for service in the royal army or to garrison royal castles. The total number of knights owed was called the servitium debitum (Latin: "service owed"), and historian Richard Huscroft estimates this number was around 5,000. In reality, the servitium debitum was greater than any king would actually need in wartime. Its main purpose was for assessing how much scutage the king was owed. Scutage was used to pay for mercenaries, which were an important part of any Norman army.

== See also ==
- Crown Jewels of the United Kingdom – British royal regalia
- English overseas possessions – Territories ruled by the Kingdom of England
- List of English monarchs
- Privy Council of England – Body of advisers to the sovereign of the Kingdom of England

== Bibliography ==
- Bull, Stephen; Seed, Mike (1998). Bloody Preston: The Battle of Preston, 1648. Lancaster: Carnegie Publishing Ltd. ISBN 1-85936-041-6.
- Carey, Hilary M. (2011) [2010]. God's Empire: Religion and Colonialism in the British World, c. 1801–1908. Cambridge University Press. p. 41. ISBN 978-1-139-49409-0.
- Douglas, David C. (1964). William the Conqueror: The Norman Impact Upon England. Berkeley: University of California Press. OCLC 399137.
- Elton, Geoffrey R. (1977). Reform and Reformation: England, 1509–1558. Edward Arnold. ISBN 0-7131-5952-9.
- Gaunt, Peter (1996). Oliver Cromwell. Blackwell. ISBN 0-631-18356-6.
- Giles, J.A. (1914). The Anglo-Saxon Chronicle . London: G. Bell and Sonson. p. 114 – via Wikisource.
- Harris, Stephen (2004). Race and Ethnicity in Anglo-Saxon Literature. London: Routledge. ISBN 9780203497999.
- Byrne, Francis John (2004). Irish Kings and High Kings. Dublin: Four Courts. ISBN 9781851825523.
- Mattingly, Garrett (1962). The defeat of the Spanish Armada. Harmondsworth: Penguin. OCLC 66075359.
- Martin, Colin; Parker, Geoffrey (1999). The Spanish Armada. Manchester: Manchester University Press. ISBN 9781901341140.
- Vego, Milan N. (1999). Naval Strategy and Operations in Narrow Seas. Portland: Frank Cass. ISBN 9780714648705.
- Harris, Tim (2005). Restoration:Charles II and His Kingdoms 1660–1685. Allen Lane. ISBN 978-0713991918.
- Firth, C. H.; Rait, Robert S. (1911). Acts and Ordinances of the Interregnum, 1642–1660. Vol. 3. London: His Majesty's Stationery Office. OCLC 277167908.
- Youngs Jr., Frederic (1979). Southern England. Guide to the Local Administrative Units of England. Vol. 1. London: Royal Historical Society. ISBN 978-0-901050-67-0.
- Chandler, J. A. (2007). Explaining Local Government: Local Government in Britain Since 1800. Manchester: Manchester University Press. ISBN 978-0-7190-6706-8.
- Huscroft, Richard (2016). Ruling England, 1042–1217 (2nd ed.). Routledge. ISBN 978-1138786554.
- Israel, Jonathan (1989a). Dutch Primacy in World Trade, 1585-1740 (E-book ed.). Clarendon Press. ISBN 9780191591822.
- Hackwood, Frederick William (1923). The Story of the Shire, being the Lore, History and Evolution of English County Institutions. London: Heath Cranton. OCLC 459703458.
- Byrne, Tony (1994). Local Government in Britain. Harmondsworth: Penguin Books. ISBN 978-0-14-017663-6.
- Winchester, Angus J L (1990). Discovering Parish Boundaries. Oxford: Shire Publications. ISBN 978-0-7478-0060-6.
- Israel, Jonathan (1989b). The Dutch Republic and the 'Glorious Revolution' of 1688/89 in England. Greenwich: Trustees National Maritime Museum. pp. 31–44. ISBN 978-0948065033.
- Jolliffe, J. E. A. (1961). The Constitutional History of Medieval England from the English Settlement to 1485 (4th ed.). Adams and Charles Black.
- Keynes, Simon (1998). "Alfred and the Mercians". In Blackburn, Mark A.S.; Dumville, David N. (eds.). Kings, currency, and alliances: history and coinage of southern England in the ninth century. Woodbridge: Boydell & Brewer. pp. 1–46. ISBN 978-0-8511-5598-2.
- Keynes, Simon (2014) [1st edition 1999]. "Appendix I: Rulers of the English, c. 450–1066". In Lapidge, Michael; Blair, John; Keynes, Simon; Scragg, Donald (eds.). The Wiley Blackwell Encyclopedia of Anglo-Saxon England (Second ed.). Chichester, West Sussex: Wiley Blackwell. pp. 521–538. ISBN 978-0-4706-5632-7.
- Simon Keynes; Michael Lapidge, eds. (1983). Alfred the Great: Asser's Life of King Alfred & Other Contemporary Sources. New York: Penguin. pp. 97–98. ISBN 9780140444094.
- Lynch, Michael (1992). Scotland: A New History. Pimlico. pp. 311. ISBN 0-7126-9893-0.
- Grattan, Henry (1822). The Speeches of the Right Honourable Henry Grattan in the Irish, and in the Imperial Parliament. Vol. II. Longman, Hurst, Rees, Orme and Brown. OCLC 217485581.
- Youings, Joyce A. (1960). "The Council of the West". Transactions of the Royal Historical Society. 10: 41–59. doi:10.2307/3678773. JSTOR 3678773.
- Mayhew, A. L.; Skeat, Walter W. (1888). A Concise Dictionary of Middle English From A.D. 1150 to 1580. Oxford: Clarendon Press. OCLC 1051084.
- Holdsworth, William Searle (1913). A History of English Law. London: Methuen. OCLC 1049426716.
- Mock, Steven (2011). Symbols of Defeat in the Construction of National Identity. Cambridge University Press. ISBN 9781107013360. OCLC 1097164619.
- Nelson, Lynn H. (1966). The Normans in South Wales, 1070–1171. Austin and London: University of Texas Press. Archived from the original on 10 April 2005.
- Palmer, M. A.J. (2007). Command at Sea: Naval Command and Control since the Sixteenth Century. Harvard University Press. ISBN 9780674041912.
- Prestwich, Michael (1997). Edward I. English Monarchs (Revised Second ed.). Yale University Press. ISBN 978-0-3000-7209-9. OL 704063M.
- Ramsay, James Hill (1908). "Henry III, A.D. 1237–1241". The Dawn of the Constitution or The Reigns of Henry III and Edward I (A.D. 1216 – 1307). The Scholar's History of England: Volume IV. London: Swan Sonnenschein & Co. pp. 82–83.
- Vince, Alan (1990). Saxon London: An Archaeological Investigation. London: B.A. Seaby. ISBN 9781852640194.
- Robison, William; Fritze, Ronald H. (1996). Historical Dictionary of Stuart England, 1603–1689. Greenwood Press. p. 147. ISBN 978-0313283918.
- Rollason, David W. (2003). Northumbria, 500 – 1100: Creation and Destruction of a Kingdom. Cambridge University Press. ISBN 0-521-81335-2.
- Seward, Desmond (1978). The Hundred Years War: The English in France, 1337–1453. New York: Atheneum.
- Stenton, Frank (1971). Anglo-Saxon England (3rd ed.). Oxford University Press. ISBN 978-0-19-280139-5.
- Troost, Wout (2005). William III, The Stadholder-king: A Political Biography. Translated by J. C. Grayson. Ashgate Publishing. ISBN 0-7546-5071-5.
- Turner, Ralph V. (2009). King John: England's Evil King?. Stroud, UK: History Press. ISBN 978-0-7524-4850-3.
- Williams, Glanmor (1993). Renewal and reformation : Wales, c.1415–1642. Oxford: Oxford University Press. ISBN 0192852779.
- Williams, Neville (1973). The Life and Times of Henry VII. London: Weidenfeld and Nicolson. ISBN 978-0-297-76517-2.
- Willson, David Harris (1963) [1956], King James VI & I, London: Jonathan Cape, ISBN 978-0-2246-0572-4
- Bartlett, Robert (2002). England under the Norman and Angevin kings: 1075–1225. Oxford: Oxford University Press. ISBN 9781383011357.
- Black, J.B. (2004). The Reign of Elizabeth, 1558–1603. Oxford: Clarendon Press. ISBN 9780198217015.
- Borman, Tracy (2020). Thomas Cromwell: The Untold Story of Henry VIII's Most Faithful Servant. London: Hodder. ISBN 9781444782882.
- Clayton, F. David Roberts; Bisson, Douglas (2016). Prehistory to 1714. A History of England. Vol. 1. London: Routledge.
- Elton, G. R. (1955). England under the Tudors. London: Methuen. ISBN 9781138602731.
- Ellis, Steven G. (2014). Ireland in the age of the Tudors, 1447–1603: English expansion and the end of Gaelic rule. London: Routledge.
- Guy, John (2013). The Tudors: a very short introduction. Oxford: Oxford University Press.
- Harriss, G.L. (2005). Shaping the nation: England 1360–1461. Oxford =: Oxford University Press.
- Jacob, E.F. (1961). The Fifteenth Century, 1399–1485. Oxford =: Oxford History of England.
- Jenkins, Elizabeth (1964). Elizabeth the Great. Time Incorporated.
- Jones, J. Gwynfor (1989). Wales and the Tudor state: government, religious change and the social order, 1534–1603. University of Wales Press.
- Levin, Carole (2013). The heart and stomach of a king: Elizabeth I and the politics of sex and power. University of Pennsylvania Press.
- Loades, David Michael (1999). Politics and nation: England 1450–1660. Wiley-Blackwell.
- Loades, David Michael (1997). Power in Tudor England.
- McCaffrey, Wallace (1993). Elizabeth I. London: Hodder. ISBN 034056167X.
- McKisack, May (1959). The Fourteenth Century, 1307–1399. Oxford: Oxford History of England.
- Neale, J.E. (1957). Queen Elizabeth I: a biography.
- Penn, Thomas (2012). Winter king: Henry VII and the dawn of Tudor England.
- Powicke, Maurice (1962). The Thirteenth Century, 1216–1307. Oxford History of England.
- Ridley, Jasper G. (1985). Henry VIII.
- Thomson, John A.F. (2014). The Transformation of Medieval England 1370–1529. London: Routledge.
- Williams, Penry (1995). The Later Tudors: England, 1547–1603. Oxford: Oxford University Press.

Preceded by Wessex c. 519–10th century	Kingdom of England; 10th century – 1649	Succeeded by English Interregnum; 1649–1660
Preceded by English Interregnum; 1649–1660	Kingdom of England; 1660–1707	Succeeded by Kingdom of Great Britain; 1707–1800
