= Historic Counties Institute =

British organisation concerned with historic county geography

The Historic Counties Institute (HCI) is a United Kingdom organisation concerned with the historic counties of Britain and Ireland. It operates RealCounties.com and the Real Counties Map, publishes research and explanatory material on county geography and history, produces contemporary statistics aggregated to historic-county boundaries, and analyses the relationship between historic counties and current or proposed administrative geography. It also campaigns for greater recognition and use of historic counties and for a clearer distinction between geographic counties, local-government areas and lieutenancy areas.

Earlier campaigning associated with RealCounties.com was conducted under the name Campaign for Historic Counties (CHC). The Campaign name appeared in press coverage during the early 2020s and continued to be used in public and parliamentary discussion into 2026. By later 2026, press coverage identified the organisation under the Historic Counties Institute name.

== History ==
The organisation's earlier public campaigning was carried out under the Campaign for Historic Counties name. Its campaigning included calls for historic counties to receive greater recognition in maps, road signage and public terminology, and for a clearer distinction between historic-county geography and areas used for local government.

In September 2021, a question tabled in the House of Lords by Lord Lexden asked the UK Government what plans it had to ensure the preservation of England's historic counties. The ensuing discussion covered their representation on maps, county-boundary signs and their relationship with ceremonial and administrative arrangements. The government minister Lord Greenhalgh referred to changes made in 2014 to allow signs marking traditional county boundaries and to the commissioning of historic-county boundary data from Ordnance Survey in 2015.

Writing in The Yorkshire Post following the debate, Lord Caine said that proposals for historic counties to appear routinely on maps and to be used for ceremonial purposes were advocated by the Campaign for Historic Counties.

The Campaign received further press coverage in 2023. The Scottish Daily Express described it as a pressure group seeking to protect historic county identities in Scotland and reported its proposals concerning county-boundary signage, mapping, lieutenancy arrangements and administrative terminology. Later that year, The Daily Telegraph included the Campaign among organisations concerned with the recognition of traditional county and place names.

The Campaign name continued to appear publicly into 2026. During a House of Commons Public Bill Committee sitting on the Railways Bill on 22 January 2026, Olly Glover MP referred by name to the Campaign for Historic Counties during discussion of local-government geography and said that he sometimes engaged with comments on its Facebook page.

By August 2026, The Guardian identified Joshua Malone as director of public affairs for the Historic Counties Institute in coverage of proposed local-government reorganisation affecting Rutland. The article discussed HCI's distinction between historic county geography and changing administrative boundaries and reported its position on the relationship between lieutenancy areas and historic counties.

In September 2026, the Scottish Daily Express reported HCI's response to proposals for restructuring local government in Scotland. The article discussed the Institute's argument that administrative areas should be named in ways that do not obscure historic county identities.

== Research and publications ==
HCI publishes research and explanatory material through RealCounties.com on the history, geography and contemporary use of historic counties. Subjects covered include county boundaries, local government, lieutenancy, historical legislation, detached parts, counties corporate, postal geography, county naming and terminology, and the county geography of individual towns and cities.

The Institute has published explanatory material on the Local Government Act 1888, the reorganisation of local government in England and Wales in 1974, Scottish local-government reorganisation in 1975, the status and use of historic counties, and differences between geographic and administrative boundaries.

Other publications deal with subjects including detached parts of counties, counties corporate, differences between county boundaries shown on different maps, and the relationship between postcodes and county geography.

The site also publishes place-specific articles addressing locations whose historic-county geography differs from, or is commonly confused with, later administrative geography.

== Real Counties Map ==
HCI operates the Real Counties Map, an interactive mapping resource which displays historic-county boundaries and allows them to be compared with other geographical and administrative layers.

The map allows users to search for places and postcodes and to view historic counties alongside current council areas, lieutenancy areas and other public boundary systems. HCI presents the layers separately in order to allow differences between geographic and administrative boundaries to be examined.

For historic-county geography, HCI follows the Historic Counties Standard, a definition of the names, areas and boundaries of the historic counties published by the Historic Counties Trust. Current administrative and electoral layers are based on official boundary datasets.

The multi-layer approach is comparable in principle with the Office for National Statistics' Index of Place Names (IPN), which links named places to a range of administrative, health, electoral and other geographies.

== Census and statistical work ==
In 2026 HCI began publishing contemporary official census statistics aggregated to historic-county geography.

The project uses 2021 census data for England and Wales published by the Office for National Statistics, 2021 census data for Northern Ireland from the Northern Ireland Statistics and Research Agency, and Scotland's Census 2022 data from National Records of Scotland. HCI carries out additional geographical processing to aggregate the source data to historic-county boundaries and publishes the resulting statistics through the Real Counties Map.

The underlying statistical data remain those published by the respective national statistical agencies, while the aggregation to historic-county geography is undertaken by RealCounties. Published measures include population and demographic indicators, with further census variables being added as the project develops.

HCI describes the project as a means of allowing modern statistics to be examined using a geographical framework independent of changing local-government boundaries.

== Local-government reorganisation analysis ==
HCI has used the Real Counties Map to analyse existing and proposed local-government structures. During the programme of local government reorganisation in England, proposed authority areas were added to the map so that they could be compared with existing council areas and historic-county boundaries.

The Institute has also published analyses and consultation responses relating to individual reorganisation proposals. These distinguish between the areas of proposed local authorities and the historic counties through which those areas extend.

One such analysis concerned the proposed Ridgeway authority, whose proposed area crosses existing administrative boundaries associated with Berkshire and Oxfordshire. HCI used its mapping data to calculate the proportion of the proposed authority lying within each historic county and used the example in support of its policy on the distinction between administrative and geographic names.

HCI's involvement in discussion of proposed changes affecting Rutland received national press coverage in August 2026. In September 2026, its response to proposed Scottish local-government reform was reported by the Scottish Daily Express.

== Aims and policies ==
HCI distinguishes historic or geographic counties from areas used for local administration, lieutenancy, postal addressing and statistical purposes. It argues that these systems should be described separately rather than treated as alternative definitions of the same geographical unit.

The Institute does not advocate making historic counties units of local government. It states that local-government structures may be reorganised independently of historic-county geography and that recognition of the historic counties does not require council areas to follow historic-county boundaries.

Its stated objectives include greater recognition of historic counties in mapping and public records, the marking of historic county boundaries, clearer terminology for administrative areas and the realignment of lieutenancy areas with historic counties.

HCI also argues that councils and other administrative bodies should use names which distinguish their administrative territories from geographic counties, particularly where an authority crosses historic-county boundaries.

The Institute's policy on lieutenancy areas received national attention during the 2026 debate over Rutland. The Guardian reported HCI's position that lieutenancy arrangements should be aligned with historic-county geography rather than being dependent upon changing local-government boundaries.

== Public and parliamentary engagement ==
The Campaign for Historic Counties and, subsequently, HCI have appeared in press and parliamentary discussion concerning county identity and geography.

Following the September 2021 House of Lords question on historic counties, Lord Caine wrote in The Yorkshire Post that the Campaign for Historic Counties advocated the routine appearance of historic counties on maps and their use for ceremonial purposes.

In January 2023, the Scottish Daily Express published an article centred on the Campaign's proposals for Scotland. Later that year, The Daily Telegraph named it among organisations campaigning around traditional county and place identities.

The Campaign was explicitly mentioned in Parliament in January 2026, when Olly Glover MP referred to it during a Public Bill Committee sitting on the Railways Bill.

Under the Historic Counties Institute name, the organisation was quoted by The Guardian in August 2026 in connection with the proposed reorganisation of local government in Rutland. The following month, the Scottish Daily Express reported HCI's response to proposed Scottish local-government reform and quoted its director of public affairs on the naming of administrative areas and their relationship with historic counties.

== See also ==
- Association of British Counties
- Historic Counties Trust
- Historic counties of England
- Historic counties of Scotland
- Historic counties of Wales
- Counties of Ireland
- Lieutenancy areas of the United Kingdom
