= List of ancient counties of England by area in 1891 =

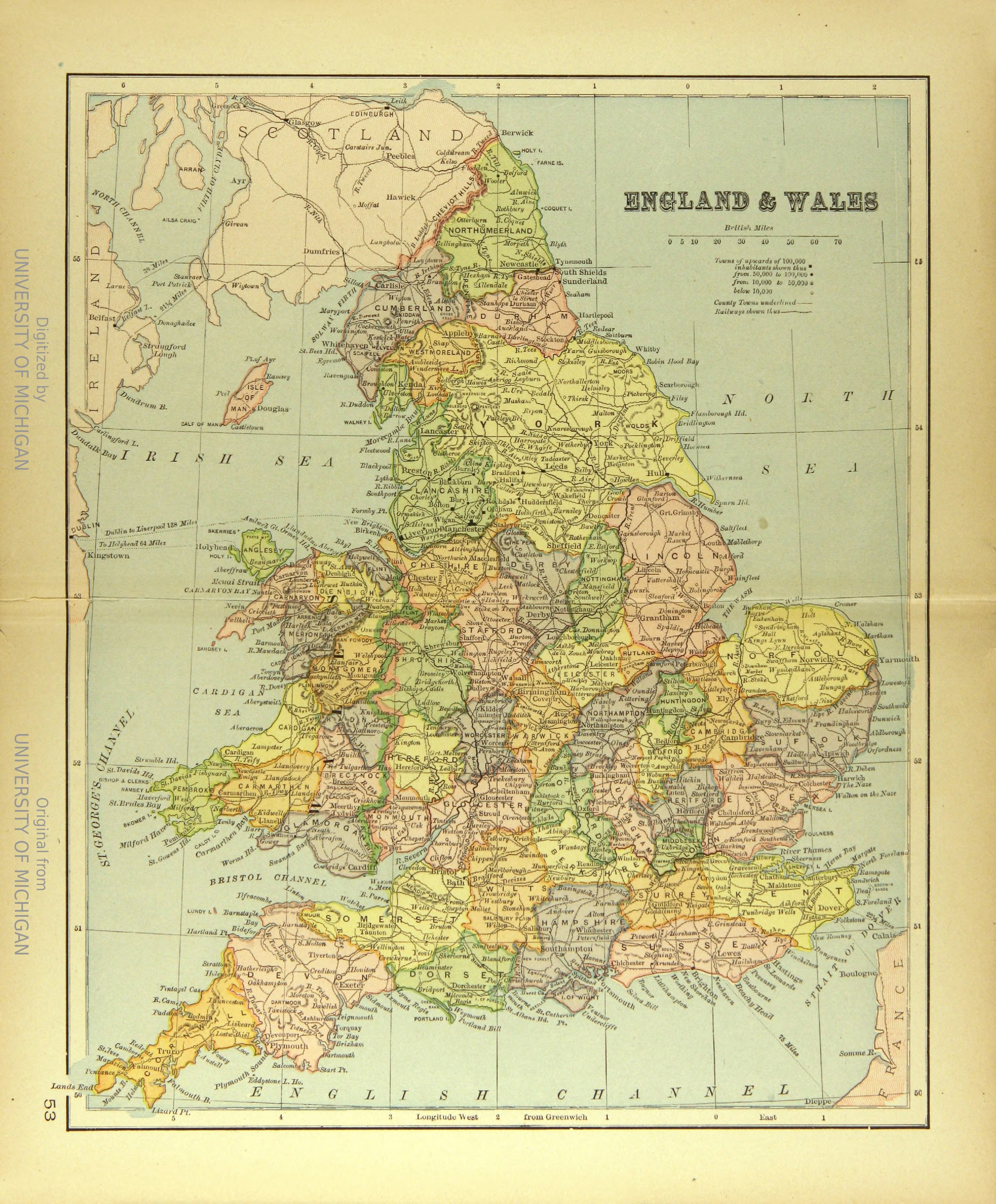
Counties of England and Wales (1894 map)

This list shows the ancient counties of England (excluding Monmouth shire), as recorded by the 1891 census, and ordered by their area.

Rank	County	Area (acres)	Area (square miles)
1	Yorkshire	3,882,848	6,067
2	Lincolnshire	1,693,547	2,646
3	Devon	1,667,097	2,605
4	Norfolk	1,308,440	2,044
5	Northumberland	1,289,756	2,015
6	Lancashire	1,207,605	1,887
7	Somerset	1,043,485	1,630
8	Hampshire	1,037,764	1,622
9	Kent	995,344	1,555
10	Essex	987,028	1,542
11	Cumberland	970,161	1,516
12	Suffolk	952,709	1,489
13	Sussex	933,269	1,458
14	Wiltshire	880,248	1,375
15	Cornwall	868,068	1,356
16	Shropshire	859,516	1,343
17	Gloucestershire	795,734	1,243
18	Staffordshire	749,601	1,171
19	Derbyshire	658,876	1,029
20	Cheshire	657,068	1,027
21	Durham	647,281	1,011
22	Northamptonshire	641,992	1,003
23	Dorset	632,272	987
24	Warwickshire	577,462	902
25	Cambridgeshire	549,749	859
26	Nottinghamshire	539,752	843
27	Herefordshire	537,363	839
28	Leicestershire	527,124	823
29	Westmorland	500,906	782
30	Surrey	485,128	758
31	Oxfordshire	483,614	755
32	Worcestershire	480,560	751
33	Buckinghamshire	475,694	743
34	Berkshire	462,224	722
35	Hertfordshire	406,161	635
36	Bedfordshire	298,494	466
37	Huntingdonshire	234,218	366
38	Middlesex	181,301	283
39	Rutland	97,273	152
