= List of counties of England by area in 1831 =

This is a list of historic counties of England by area as at the 1831 United Kingdom census. Note that Monmouthshire was considered to be part of England at the time.

Rank	County	Area
1	Yorkshire	3,669,510 acres (14,850.0 km^{2})
2	Lincolnshire	1,663,850 acres (6,733.4 km^{2})
3	Devon	1,636,450 acres (6,622.5 km^{2})
4	Norfolk	1,292,300 acres (5,230 km^{2})
5	Northumberland	1,165,430 acres (4,716.3 km^{2})
6	Somerset	1,028,090 acres (4,160.5 km^{2})
7	Hampshire	1,018,550 acres (4,121.9 km^{2})
8	Essex	979,000 acres (3,960 km^{2})
9	Lancashire	977,260 acres (3,954.8 km^{2})
10	Kent	972,240 acres (3,934.5 km^{2})
11	Cumberland	969,490 acres (3,923.4 km^{2})
12	Suffolk	918,760 acres (3,718.1 km^{2})
13	Sussex	907,920 acres (3,674.2 km^{2})
14	Wiltshire	869,620 acres (3,519.2 km^{2})
15	Shropshire	864,360 acres (3,497.9 km^{2})
16	Cornwall	854,770 acres (3,459.1 km^{2})
17	Gloucestershire	790,470 acres (3,198.9 km^{2})
18	Staffordshire	736,290 acres (2,979.7 km^{2})
19	County Durham	679,530 acres (2,750.0 km^{2})
20	Derbyshire	663,180 acres (2,683.8 km^{2})
21	Cheshire	649,050 acres (2,626.6 km^{2})
22	Northamptonshire	646,810 acres (2,617.5 km^{2})
23	Dorset	627,220 acres (2,538.3 km^{2})
24	Warwickshire	567,930 acres (2,298.3 km^{2})
25	Herefordshire	543,800 acres (2,201 km^{2})
26	Cambridgeshire	536,853 acres (2,172.57 km^{2})
27	Nottinghamshire	525,800 acres (2,128 km^{2})
28	Leicestershire	511,340 acres (2,069.3 km^{2})
29	Westmorland	485,990 acres (1,966.7 km^{2})
30	Surrey	474,480 acres (1,920.2 km^{2})
31	Berkshire	472,270 acres (1,911.2 km^{2})
32	Oxfordshire	467,380 acres (1,891.4 km^{2})
33	Buckinghamshire	463,820 acres (1,877.0 km^{2})
34	Worcestershire	459,710 acres (1,860.4 km^{2})
35	Hertfordshire	400,370 acres (1,620.2 km^{2})
36	Monmouthshire	324,310 acres (1,312.4 km^{2})
37	Bedfordshire	297,632 acres (1,204.47 km^{2})
38	Huntingdonshire	241,690 acres (978.1 km^{2})
39	Middlesex	179,590 acres (726.8 km^{2})
40	Rutland	97,500 acres (395 km^{2})
