= CountyWatch =

Direct action group in the UK

CountyWatch is a direct action group in the United Kingdom that was set up in 2004 to remove what they consider to be wrongly placed county boundary signs – i.e. signs that do not mark the historic or ancient county boundaries of England and Wales. Since 2005, Count Nikolai Tolstoy has been a patron of CountyWatch. CountyWatch and its supporters claim to have removed, re-sited or erected 80 county boundary signs in Dorset, County Durham, Greater Manchester, Hampshire, Lancashire, Lincolnshire, North Yorkshire, Somerset and Warwickshire.

A prominent member of the group is Anthony Bennett, a British politician. In May 2002 Bennett was prosecuted for removing 29 metric road signs, claiming they were illegal and that he was preventing the law from being broken. He buried the signs in four locations under bushes. Initially found guilty of theft and criminal damage, his theft conviction was overturned in October 2002 on appeal. The judge stated that "there was no evidence of dishonesty or that he intended to permanently deprive the owners of their signs." His conviction for criminal damage was upheld, but the judge discharged the sentence, which had been 50 hours of community service.

== Beliefs ==
The Anglo-Saxons set up a network of shires whose boundaries, in some cases, have been unchanged for over 1,000 years. The Normans may have conquered us in 1066 but at least they left our shire boundaries in place, just changing the name to "Counties" when they placed their own Counts in charge of the shires. The Conservatives under Edward Heath started the process of dismantling our network of shire Counties when they created the hugely unpopular new "Counties" of Avon, Humberside and Cleveland. Now it seems Labour wants to finish them off. Many English people have a strong sense of place and we are sure many of them will fight hard to keep alive and healthy the names and the real boundaries of our Counties.

— Derek Norman, Chairman of CountyWatch

CountyWatch sees the abolition of democratically elected county councils in the UK as part of a long-term project to weaken the constituent nations of Europe, notably the UK, and to concentrate power at two levels: Brussels (the European Commission) and the "regions" within countries.

There have been similar illegal acts before. The former county of Humberside was extremely unpopular with some of its residents. The book The Fight for Yorkshire by Michael Bradford detailed a series of cases where signs were altered to read "East Riding of Yorkshire" in North Humberside. None of these acts were ever prosecuted and in 1996 the county was abolished.

== Direct action ==
=== Bedfordshire ===
In August 2007, CountyWatch took its campaign to Bedfordshire, where, in November 2006, Bedfordshire County Council erected four signs on the main roads on the north, west and south sides out of Luton proclaiming 'Welcome to Bedfordshire'. Luton is the largest town within the historic and ceremonial county of Bedfordshire. Some letter writers still address mail to "Luton Beds". Some organisations based in Luton, such as the University of Bedfordshire, include 'Bedfordshire' as part of their address. In 1996, the Royal Mail stopped using Postal Counties as a method of sorting mail, using instead the post code. However, they have a "flexible addressing policy" whereby historic counties can be used. Luton became a unitary authority on 1 April 1997. Bedfordshire County Council no longer runs any services in the area covered by Luton Borough Council.

The County Council erected the signs only in November 2006 in a struggle to save Bedfordshire County Council from extinction against rival bids from the Borough of Bedford to become a unitary Borough Council and from Mid Bedfordshire and South Bedfordshire Councils to become another unitary authority, to be called Central Bedfordshire.

The signs were unpopular with some Luton residents, some of whom called the signs "snooty". Bedfordshire County Council responded by saying, "Luton has been a unitary authority since 1997 and is therefore not part of Bedfordshire. In July 2007, the government announced that Bedfordshire County Council would be abolished in 2010.

On 9 August 2007, CountyWatch removed four Welcome to Bedfordshire signs from Luton, claiming they were misleading to the public. One sign was removed from the B653 to Wheathampstead and re-erected on the A505 near Stopsley in front of a Welcome to Luton sign. The other three signs were removed from the A6, the A505 and the B579. CountyWatch claimed these were being stored at a secure location and added that the signs would be returned to the County Council if they were re-sited on what CountyWatch deem to be the true Bedfordshire boundaries. The County Council responded by stating that, "This is absolutely crazy. We are proud of our county and we like to ensure that visitors are given a warm welcome. The signs on the edge of Luton mark the boundaries of their responsibilities and the beginnings of ours."

=== Berkshire ===
In April 2006 the group set up "Royal County of Berkshire" signs on the ancient border between Berkshire and Oxfordshire. The signs were quickly removed. The Mayor of Abingdon, once the county town of Berkshire, now administered by Oxfordshire County Council, said "I still get letters addressed to me with Abingdon, Berkshire, and many older people still have allegiances." The Mayor of Wantage, however, noted, "I think Count Tolstoy and his supporters are living in the past. They need to face reality. I know there are many older people in Wantage who still think of themselves as Berkshire people, but the reality is that time has moved on and we can't go backwards." The Mayor of Faringdon said that "Faringdon should stay in Oxfordshire", noting that "when we were in Berkshire, County Hall in Reading was so far away. It's much better for us to get into Oxford."

=== Dorset and Hampshire border ===
On 10 November 2005, Tony Bennett removed a Dorset sign from Chewton Bunny at Highcliffe and moved it to its historic location at the original County Gates border between Bournemouth and Poole, claiming that while Bournemouth and neighbouring Christchurch had been administered by Dorset County Council for the past 30 years, they remained historically Hampshire towns.

=== Durham ===
In May 2006, CountyWatch announced that it has been contacted by Durham residents who were unhappy that Durham County Council had recently relocated signs from the historic boundary between Durham and Yorkshire and relocated them to the Darlington boundary. It would be travelling around Durham looking to see whether signs were on what it consider to be the correct, true border and would remove County Durham signs from the border with the unitary authority of Darlington to the historic and currently ceremonial border with North Yorkshire on the River Tees on 25 May 2006 and re-erect them on suitable posts along the River Tees.

The BBC and Tyne Tees Television filmed CountyWatch removing the boundary signs at Royal Oak. Twelve signs with, "County Durham: Land of the Prince Bishops" were removed. Three of them were re-erected along the historic border between Yorkshire and Durham – the River Tees, also the current ceremonial border. The Council were informed by CountyWatch of the location of the other signs they removed. Durham County Council issued a statement saying that CountyWatch's actions were "nothing more than sheer vandalism, no less mindless or anti-social than smashing bus stops or phone boxes".

On 31 May 2006, an article in The Northern Echo newspaper praised the group's actions, calling the council's statement "a trifle wide of the mark" and ended the article - "Carry on CountyWatch".

=== Lancashire ===
In November 2005 CountyWatch removed over thirty 'Welcome to Lancashire' signs from Blackburn, Blackpool, Skelmersdale and Southport, placing all of them on the historic Lancashire/Yorkshire border at Blacko near Nelson, where they telephoned the Council's Solicitor. Lancashire County Council reacted by stating that "the cost of replacing the signs would be met from taxpayers' money." and also that it would be speaking to the police about the group. The Welcome to Lancashire signs were erected on the boundaries with Blackburn with Darwen and Blackpool unitary authorities by the county council in 2004 to show where its services begin. CountyWatch responded stating that, "The sign says 'Welcome to Lancashire', it doesn't say 'Welcome to the administrative unit of Lancashire County Council - that would be all right." The signs which were dumped by the side of the A682 in Blacko, near to the historic border with Yorkshire, were recovered by Lancashire County Council who stated that they would re-erect them.

CountyWatch also claimed to have removed the larger brown-coloured motorway signs on the M6, M66 and M61 which read "Welcome to Lancashire the Red Rose County". They also claimed that they had a legal right to remove signs under the section 131 of the Highways Act 1980 because "they misinform the public".

=== Lincolnshire ===
On 27 July 2005, the BBC TV Look North regional news programme featured the group and filmed it in the act of removing a "Welcome to the County of Lincolnshire" sign near Brigg. Lincolnshire County Council Area Highways Manager Eric Jorgensen described the group as "self-appointed and unelected" and stated that taxpayers would be forced to pay for the signs to be replaced.

On 22 September 2005, CountyWatch removed ten road signs stating: "Welcome to the County of Lincolnshire" between Brigg and Immingham, which the group claimed there was no point in putting up a welcome sign 15 miles into the historic county. CountyWatch claimed, "Lincolnshire starts where Yorkshire finishes – not 20 miles into Lincolnshire. We want them erected on the proper boundary". Lincolnshire County Council however attacked the group for taking council property and said "it will cost the taxpayer to put the signs back up". The signs were deposited at a council depot after being removed.

=== Somerset ===
In August 2004, CountyWatch's first action was the removal of five signs saying 'Welcome to the County of Somerset', on the northern border of the non-metropolitan county of Somerset with either Bath and North East Somerset or North Somerset. The signs were taken down by CountyWatch members and relocated on the historic borders of Somerset with neighbouring historic counties Gloucestershire and Wiltshire.

== Nine new local authorities ==
On 25 July 2007, the Local Government Minister, John Healey from the Department for Communities and Local Government announced that nine all-purpose local authorities would be created in 2009 in England.

CountyWatch see this as the next phase of attempts to replace the administration of England and Wales by county and district councils with a series of so-called 'unitary' authorities, which combine the administrative functions of both district councils and county councils. Region-wide functions will be carried out by regional development agencies and new government quangos, following the announcement earlier in the month of the abolition of unelected regional assemblies from 2010.

On 4 November 2020 County Watch was represented by Patron Count Nikolai Tolstoy and Secretary Tony Bennett at the formation of the new All Party Parliamentary Group (APPG) on Historic Counties. The meeting was chaired by Andrew Rosindell, Conservative MP for Romford. The Parliamentary Group consisted of Conservative and Labour MPs and members of both houses. County Watch has made a written submission to the APPG making suggestions for achieving greater recognition of the nation's historic county boundaries.

== See also ==
- Association of British Counties
- Friends of Real Lancashire
- Yorkshire Ridings Society
