= Saddleworth White Rose Society =

- Founded: 1974
- Purpose: Historic counties of England
- Location: Uppermill, Saddleworth
- Website: whiterose.saddleworth.net

The Saddleworth White Rose Society is a political advocacy group dedicated to the promotion of the historic county of Yorkshire as the primary geographic reference frame for Saddleworth, a civil parish amalgamated into the Metropolitan Borough of Oldham and metropolitan county of Greater Manchester under the Local Government Act 1972.

The group, associated with the more general Yorkshire Ridings Society, aims to gain wider recognition for the use of the historic county system over the modern county system. It promotes their contention that Saddleworth remains in Yorkshire, as it asserts that the historic counties were never abolished and exist alongside the new metropolitan counties, via the publication of its newsletter and the organisation of various events.

Saddleworth is the only part of the Metropolitan Borough of Oldham or Greater Manchester that formed part of the former administrative county of Yorkshire, West Riding, the rest formerly being part of Lancashire or an independent county borough.

The Society is affiliated to the Association of British Counties and has expressed support for the CountyWatch direct action group.

== See also ==
- Friends of Real Lancashire
