= Colin Holt =

Colin Holt may refer to:

- Colin Holt (footballer) (1934–2018), Australian rules footballer
- Colin Holt (activist) (1945–2006), former Chairman of the Yorkshire Ridings Society
- Colin Holt (politician) (born 1963), member of the Western Australian Legislative Council
