= 2006 Bolton Metropolitan Borough Council election =

← 2004	4 May 2006	2007 →

20 of the 60 seats on Bolton Metropolitan Borough Council 31 seats needed for a majority
	First party	Second party	Third party
Party	Labour	Conservative	Liberal Democrats
Seats won	10	7	3
Seats after	22	21	17
Seat change	▲2	▲2	▼4
Popular vote	25,452	27,096	12,789
Percentage	37.7%	40.1%	18.9%
Swing	▲6.5%	▲4.5%	▼11.2%
- Labour in red, Conservatives in blue and Liberal Democrats in orange.
Council control before election
No overall control
Council control after election
No overall control

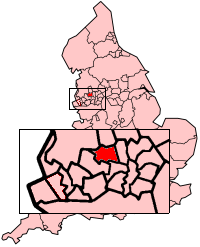
The Metropolitan Borough of Bolton shown within England.

Elections to Bolton Metropolitan Borough Council were held on 4 May 2006. One third of the council was up for election and the council stayed under no overall control, with the Labour Party overtaking the Liberal Democrats as the largest party and resuming control of the council after a two-year break.

20 seats were contested, with the Labour Party winning 10 seats, the Conservatives 7 and the Liberal Democrats 3 Overall turnout was 34.3%.

After the election, the composition of the council was:

- Labour 22
- Conservative 21
- Liberal Democrat 17

== Election result ==
Bolton local election result 2006
Party	Seats	Gains	Losses	Net gain/loss	Seats %	Votes %	Votes	+/−
Labour	10	2	0	+2	50.0	37.7	25,452	+5.8
Conservative	7	2	0	+2	35.0	40.1	27,096	+3.2
Liberal Democrats	3	0	4	-4	15.0	18.9	12,789	-11.0
Green	0	0	0	0	0.0	2.2	1,500	+1.9
Socialist Labour	0	0	0	0	0.0	0.6	379	+0.3
Veritas	0	0	0	0	0.0	0.4	288	+0.4

== Council Composition ==
Prior to the election the composition of the council was:

↓
20	19	21
Labour	Conservative	Lib Dems

After the election the composition of the council was:

↓
22	21	17
Labour	Conservative	Lib Dems

== Ward results ==
=== Astley Bridge ward ===
Astley Bridge ward
Party	Candidate	Votes	%	±%
Conservative	John Walsh	2,424	65.3	+3.0
Labour	Muhammad Rafiq	686	18.5	−1.0
Liberal Democrats	Jaleh Salari	351	9.5	−8.7
Socialist Labour	Howard Broadbent	250	6.7	+6.7
Majority		1,738	46.8	
Turnout		3,711	36.0	−4.0
Conservative hold		Swing	LD to Soc Lab 7.7	

=== Bradshaw ward ===
Bradshaw ward
Party	Candidate	Votes	%	±%
Conservative	Paul Brierley	2,319	64.3	+4.8
Labour	Janice Sutton	751	20.8	−0.2
Liberal Democrats	Stephen Howarth	539	14.9	−4.6
Majority		1,568	43.5	
Turnout		3,609	39.0	−6.0
Conservative hold		Swing	LD to Con 4.7	

=== Breightmet ward ===
Breightmet ward
Party	Candidate	Votes	%	±%
Labour	Lynda Byrne	1,435	45.6	+4.0
Conservative	Richard Elliot	1,358	43.2	+0.7
Liberal Democrats	Edward Hill	351	11.2	−4.6
Majority		77	2.4	
Turnout		3,144	31.0	−4.0
Labour hold		Swing	LD to Labour 4.3	

=== Bromley Cross ward ===
Bromley Cross ward
Party	Candidate	Votes	%	±%
Conservative	David Greenhalgh	2,725	65.0	−0.2
Labour	Anthony Terrible	712	17.0	−2.4
Liberal Democrats	Clive Atty	462	11.0	−4.4
Green	Elizbaeth Spencer	297	7.1	+7.1
Majority		2,013	47.9	
Turnout		4,191	40.0	−8.0
Conservative hold		Swing	LD to Green 5.7	

=== Crompton ward ===
Crompton ward
Party	Candidate	Votes	%	±%
Labour	Sufrana Bashir-Ismail	1,932	44.7	+21.8
Liberal Democrats	Valibhai Patel	1,132	26.2	−25.6
Conservative	Donald Fairclough	941	21.8	+0.1
Veritas	Anthony Backhouse	190	4.4	+4.4
Socialist Labour	Lynne Lowe	129	3.0	+1.2
Majority		800	18.5	
Turnout		4,324	43.0	+0.0
Labour gain from Liberal Democrats		Swing	LD to Labour 23.7	

=== Farnworth ward ===
Farnworth ward
Party	Candidate	Votes	%	±%
Labour	Noel Spencer	1,296	58.9	+7.4
Conservative	Peter Taylor	509	23.1	+1.6
Liberal Democrats	David Connor	394	17.9	−9.1
Majority		787	35.8	
Turnout		2,199	21.0	−6.0
Labour hold		Swing	LD to Labour 8.2	

=== Great Lever ward ===
Great Lever ward
Party	Candidate	Votes	%	±%
Labour	Mohammed Ayub	1,889	58.7	+19.4
Conservative	Christine Wild	669	20.8	−19.4
Liberal Democrats	Gulamali Jiva	335	10.4	−10.2
Green	Alan Johnson	327	10.2	+10.2
Majority		1,220	37.9	
Turnout		3,220	34.0	−4.0
Labour hold		Swing	Con to Labour 19.4	

=== Halliwell ward ===
Halliwell ward
Party	Candidate	Votes	%	±%
Labour	Akhtar Zaman	2,289	69.4	+12.2
Conservative	Jamie Douglas	605	18.3	−2.1
Liberal Democrats	Nathan Biney	404	12.2	−10.2
Majority		1,684	51.1	
Turnout		3,298	34.0	−1.0
Labour hold		Swing	LD to Labour 11.2	

=== Harper Green ward ===
Harper Green ward
Party	Candidate	Votes	%	±%
Labour	Laurence Williamson	1,194	49.4	+6.0
Conservative	Robert Tyler	768	31.8	+4.4
Liberal Democrats	Geoffrey Willis	454	18.8	−10.4
Majority		426	17.6	
Turnout		2,416	25.0	−5.0
Labour hold		Swing	LD to Labour 8.2	

=== Heaton and Lostock ward ===
Heaton and Lostock ward
Party	Candidate	Votes	%	±%
Conservative	Colin Shaw	3,329	69.0	+6.4
Labour	John Gillatt	828	17.2	−1.3
Liberal Democrats	Andrew Snowden	668	13.8	−5.0
Majority		2,501	51.8	
Turnout		4,825	46.0	−7.0
Conservative hold		Swing	LD to Con 5.7	

=== Horwich and Blackrod ward ===
Horwich and Blackrod ward
Party	Candidate	Votes	%	±%
Conservative	Michael Hollick	1,151	35.1	+3.7
Labour	Isabel Seddon	1,105	33.7	+1.7
Liberal Democrats	John Cronnolley	1,025	31.2	−5.4
Majority		46	1.4	
Turnout		3,281	35.0	−7.0
Conservative gain from Liberal Democrats		Swing	LD to Con 4.5	

=== Horwich North East ward ===
Horwich North East ward
Party	Candidate	Votes	%	±%
Liberal Democrats	Stephen Rock	1,449	40.0	−16.4
Conservative	Stephen Wallen	1,169	32.3	+9.0
Labour	Madeline Murray	1,004	27.7	+7.4
Majority		280	7.7	
Turnout		3,622	38.0	−8.0
Liberal Democrats hold		Swing	LD to Con 12.7	

=== Hulton ward ===
Hulton ward
Party	Candidate	Votes	%	±%
Conservative	Andrew Morgan	1,741	53.5	+9.2
Labour	Romanna Kowalczuk	1,051	32.3	−1.9
Liberal Democrats	Linden Greensitt	463	14.2	−7.3
Majority		690	21.2	
Turnout		3,255	33.0	−8.0
Conservative hold		Swing	LD to Con 8.2	

=== Kearsley ward ===
Kearsley ward
Party	Candidate	Votes	%	±%
Labour	Derek Burrows	1,158	42.5	+10.4
Liberal Democrats	William Collison	1,079	39.6	−16.6
Conservative	Diane Bamber	487	17.9	+6.3
Majority		79	2.9	
Turnout		2,724	28.0	−5.0
Labour gain from Liberal Democrats		Swing	LD to Labour 13.5	

=== Little Lever and Darcy Lever ward ===
Little Lever and Darcy Lever ward
Party	Candidate	Votes	%	±%
Labour	Sean Hornby	1,573	42.0	+0.8
Conservative	David Broadie	1,427	38.1	−0.1
Green	Alwynne Cartmell	345	9.2	+2.6
Liberal Democrats	Wendy Connor	298	8.0	−6.0
Veritas	William Jones	98	2.6	+2.6
Majority		146	3.9	
Turnout		3,741	40.0	−4.0
Labour hold		Swing	LD to Green 4.3	

=== Rumworth ward ===
Rumworth ward
Party	Candidate	Votes	%	±%
Labour	Ismail Ibrahim	2,028	68.5	+22.5
Conservative	John Heyes	932	31.5	+15.4
Majority		1,096	37.0	
Turnout		2,960	29.0	−9.0
Labour hold		Swing		

=== Smithills ward ===
Smithills ward
Party	Candidate	Votes	%	±%
Liberal Democrats	Richard Silvester	1,621	42.4	−10.3
Conservative	Dennis Bray	1,345	35.1	+12.3
Labour	Joseph Hayes	861	22.5	+3.6
Majority		276	7.3	
Turnout		3,827	38.0	−4.0
Liberal Democrats hold		Swing	LD to Con 11.3	

=== Tonge with the Haulgh ward ===
Tonge with the Haulgh ward
Party	Candidate	Votes	%	±%
Labour	Nicholas Peel	1,598	54.2	+1.7
Conservative	Mudasir Dean	874	29.6	−6.6
Liberal Democrats	Rosalind Harasiwka	252	8.5	−2.8
Green	James Tomkinson	227	7.7	+7.7
Majority		724	24.6	
Turnout		2,951	31.0	−6.0
Labour hold		Swing	Con to Green 7.1	

=== Westhoughton North and Chew Moor ward ===
Westhoughton North & Chew Moor ward
Party	Candidate	Votes	%	±%
Conservative	John Higson	1,486	43.1	+10.3
Labour	David Chadwick	1,146	33.2	+4.3
Liberal Democrats	James Gilfallan	515	14.9	−23.4
Green	Eric Hyland	304	8.8	+8.8
Majority		342	9.9	
Turnout		3,451	35.0	−8.0
Conservative gain from Liberal Democrats		Swing	LD to Con 16.8	

=== Westhoughton South ward ===
Westhoughton South ward
Party	Candidate	Votes	%	±%
Liberal Democrats	Julia Silvester	997	36.3	−11.0
Labour	Barbara Ramsden	916	33.3	+4.8
Conservative	Michael Baker	837	30.4	+6.2
Majority		81	3.0	
Turnout		2,750	30.0	−6.0
Liberal Democrats hold		Swing	LD to Con 8.6	
