= 2007 Hull City Council election =

2007 UK local government election

Map of the results of the 2007 Hull council election. Labour in red, Liberal Democrats in yellow, Uncontested in cream.

The 2007 Hull City Council election took place on 3 May 2007 to elect members of Hull City Council in England. One third of the council was up for election and the Liberal Democrats gained overall control of the council from no overall control. Overall turnout was 27%.

After the election, the composition of the council was:

- Liberal Democrat 30
- Labour 20
- Independent 7
- Conservative 2

== Campaign ==
Before the election the Liberal Democrats had run the council as a minority administration since the 2006 election. However, by the time of the 2007 election they only had 24 seats on the council as compared to 25 for the Labour Party; with 2 Conservatives, 6 in the independent group and 2 other independent councillors making up the council. The Liberal Democrats generally received support from the Conservatives and one of the independent councillors, while Labour usually got support from the independent group. As a result, the election was expected to be close with both main parties hopeful of forming the administration after the election.

All three of the Labour, Liberal Democrat and Conservatives parties contested the 19 seats which were up for election. There were also 11 independent, 6 Green, 3 British National Party and 3 United Kingdom Independence Party candidates. An important issue in the election was poor housing in Hull, with the council planning to spend £200 million on refurbishing council properties. An important division between Labour and the Liberal Democrats was over free school meals, with Labour wanting to extend the 3-year long pilot scheme which saw all primary school pupils get free meals. However the Liberal Democrats planned to reintroduce charges for lunches while keeping breakfasts free.

As the Liberal Democrats were only defending 7 seats and had won the most votes in the 2006 election they were optimistic of making gains. They pointed to the fact that the council had recently received a second star in the council performance ratings, and were also seen as likely to benefit due to the unpopularity of the national Labour Prime Minister Tony Blair, with even the Labour leader on the council saying that "the sooner he goes, the better". The Liberal Democrats targeted the Labour held wards of Drypool, Ings, Newington, Pickering and Sutton, as well as Derringham where the independent councillor Clare Page stood down at the election.

== Election result ==
The results saw the Liberal Democrats gain 6 seats, including 5 from Labour, to hold 30 seats and thus win a majority on the council. The Liberal Democrat gains included all 6 wards which they had been targeting, with the results seen as a reflection on the Labour party nationally. The result was welcomed by the national Liberal Democrat leader, Menzies Campbell, who described the result in Hull as "tremendous".

This was the first time any party had a majority on the council since 2002 and also the first time that the Liberal Democrats had ever won a majority in Hull. Meanwhile, Labour, on 20 seats after the election, were in their worst position on the council for nearly 40 years. Following the election defeat the leader of the Labour group on the council, Ken Branson, stood down as leader and was succeeded by Steve Brady.

Hull local election result 2007
Party	Seats	Gains	Losses	Net gain/loss	Seats %	Votes %	Votes	+/−
Liberal Democrats	13	6	0	+6	68.4	46.1	19,220	+2.5
Labour	5	0	5	-5	26.3	36.0	15,011	+2.7
Independent	1	0	1	-1	5.3	5.4	2,262	-2.0
Conservative	0	0	0	0	0.0	7.8	3,251	-3.6
Green	0	0	0	0	0.0	2.1	874	+2.1
BNP	0	0	0	0	0.0	1.3	556	-1.2
UKIP	0	0	0	0	0.0	1.3	522	+1.0

== Ward results ==
Avenue
Party	Candidate	Votes	%	±%
Liberal Democrats	David Woods	1,267	43.6	−6.9
Labour	Andrew Dorton	809	27.9	+3.7
Green	Martin Deane	455	15.7	+15.7
Conservative	Basil Bulmer	221	7.6	−0.4
Independent	Haris Livas-Dawes	151	5.2	−1.1
Majority		458	15.7	−10.6
Turnout		2,903	32.4	+0.6
Liberal Democrats hold		Swing		

Beverley
Party	Candidate	Votes	%	±%
Liberal Democrats	David McCobb	1,779	72.4	+12.9
Labour	Josh Haringman	373	15.2	−8.3
Conservative	Richard Bate	233	9.5	−7.5
Green	Susan Harr	72	2.9	+2.9
Majority		1,406	57.2	+21.2
Turnout		2,457	36.9	
Liberal Democrats hold		Swing		

Boothferry
Party	Candidate	Votes	%	±%
Liberal Democrats	Karen Woods	1,453	51.4	−6.2
Labour	Mall Fields	866	30.6	+5.2
Conservative	Karen Woods	336	11.9	−5.2
UKIP	Robert Shepherd	173	6.1	+6.1
Majority		587	20.8	−11.4
Turnout		2,828	29.5	−0.2
Liberal Democrats hold		Swing		

Bransholme East
Party	Candidate	Votes	%	±%
Independent	Nadene Burton	731	60.0	−4.2
Labour	Liz Noble	336	27.6	+6.1
Liberal Democrats	Ann Godden	86	7.1	−1.4
Conservative	Ian Brown	66	5.4	+5.4
Majority		395	32.4	−10.3
Turnout		1,219	19.8	−2.6
Independent hold		Swing		

Bransholme West
Party	Candidate	Votes	%	±%
Labour	Gordon Wilson	663	48.6	−12.7
Liberal Democrats	Karen Mathieson	646	47.4	+8.7
Conservative	David Whellan	55	4.0	+4.0
Majority		17	1.2	−21.4
Turnout		1,364	23.2	+5.5
Labour hold		Swing		

Derringham
Party	Candidate	Votes	%	±%
Liberal Democrats	Helena Woods	1,236	51.5	+9.2
Labour	Simon Kelsey	506	21.1	+4.5
UKIP	John Cornforth	277	11.5	+11.5
Independent	Karen Rouse-Deane	198	8.3	−23.4
Conservative	Peter Abraham	131	5.5	−0.3
Green	James Russell	52	2.2	+2.2
Majority		730	30.4	+19.8
Turnout		2,400	27.1	−2.7
Liberal Democrats gain from Independent		Swing		

Drypool
Party	Candidate	Votes	%	±%
Liberal Democrats	Angela Wastling	1,642	52.1	−3.5
Labour	Gary Wareing	1,234	39.1	+2.5
Independent	Janet Toker	139	4.4	+4.4
Conservative	James Parker	138	4.4	−3.4
Majority		408	13.0	−6.0
Turnout		3,153	31.2	+0.8
Liberal Democrats gain from Labour		Swing		

Holderness
Party	Candidate	Votes	%	±%
Liberal Democrats	Yvonne Uzzell	1,567	55.1	−9.8
Labour	Martin Mancey	837	29.4	+4.1
Conservative	Albert Greendale	243	8.5	−1.2
Independent	Joe Matthews	197	6.9	+6.9
Majority		730	25.7	−13.9
Turnout		2,844	28.0	−2.3
Liberal Democrats hold		Swing		

Ings
Party	Candidate	Votes	%	±%
Liberal Democrats	Maureen Bristow	1,527	49.4	−11.6
Labour	Phil Webster	1,212	39.2	+9.1
Conservative	Andrew Forster	202	6.5	−0.3
Independent	Mally Reeve	152	4.9	+2.8
Majority		315	10.2	−20.7
Turnout		3,093	31.6	−2.4
Liberal Democrats gain from Labour		Swing		

Kings Park
Party	Candidate	Votes	%	±%
Liberal Democrats	Carl Minns	917	60.5	+4.9
Labour	John Nicholson	414	27.3	+6.7
Conservative	Andrew Allison	150	9.9	+3.2
Independent	Janet McCoid	34	2.2	+2.2
Majority		503	33.2	−1.8
Turnout		1,515	25.2	
Liberal Democrats hold		Swing		

Longhill
Party	Candidate	Votes	%	±%
Labour	John Black	1,145	56.6	+4.4
Liberal Democrats	Chris Gurevitch	383	18.9	−12.1
Independent	Peter Martin	253	12.5	+12.5
Conservative	Stephen Brown	243	12.0	−4.8
Majority		762	37.7	+16.5
Turnout		2,024	23.4	+0.3
Labour hold		Swing		

Marfleet
Party	Candidate	Votes	%	±%
Labour	Brenda Petch	986	59.3	−1.2
Liberal Democrats	James Morrell	298	17.9	−8.8
BNP	Mike Cooper	208	12.5	+12.5
Conservative	Wayne Hanson	172	10.3	−2.5
Majority		688	41.4	+7.6
Turnout		1,664	18.6	−0.8
Labour hold		Swing		

Myton
Party	Candidate	Votes	%	±%
Labour	Rilba Jones	995	48.8	−3.5
Liberal Democrats	Barbara Tress	271	13.3	−6.3
BNP	David Orriss	214	10.5	−5.7
Independent	Pat Penna	194	9.5	+9.5
Conservative	Reg Britton	182	8.9	−3.0
Green	Kate Bonella	112	5.5	+5.5
UKIP	Karl Horden	72	3.5	+3.5
Majority		724	35.5	+3.8
Turnout		2,040	22.0	−0.3
Labour hold		Swing		

Newington
Party	Candidate	Votes	%	±%
Liberal Democrats	Rick Welton	830	44.8	−7.5
Labour	Lynn Petrini	754	40.7	+9.5
BNP	Jonathan Mainprize	134	7.2	−4.1
Conservative	Bob Cook	80	4.3	+0.4
Independent	June Jones	56	3.0	+3.0
Majority		76	4.1	−17.0
Turnout		1,854	22.1	+0.7
Liberal Democrats gain from Labour		Swing		

Newland
Party	Candidate	Votes	%	±%
Liberal Democrats	Mark Collinson	711	55.4	−9.9
Labour	Iain Keers	329	25.6	+5.5
Green	Ruth Nicol	135	10.5	+10.5
Conservative	Martine Martin	108	8.4	+0.0
Majority		382	29.8	15.4
Turnout		1,283	21.8	
Liberal Democrats hold		Swing		

Orchard Park and Greenwood
Party	Candidate	Votes	%	±%
Labour	Trevor Larsen	1,152	70.7	+35.7
Liberal Democrats	Craig Woolmer	305	18.7	+11.0
Conservative	Sheila Airey	172	10.6	+5.8
Majority		847	52.0	
Turnout		1,629	17.7	−4.8
Labour hold		Swing		

Pickering
Party	Candidate	Votes	%	±%
Liberal Democrats	Sarita Bush	1,411	52.8	+5.5
Labour	Julie Lowery	1,037	38.8	+10.5
Conservative	Robert Brown	225	8.4	+2.4
Majority		374	14.0	−5.0
Turnout		2,673	29.4	−4.4
Liberal Democrats gain from Labour		Swing		

Sutton
Party	Candidate	Votes	%	±%
Liberal Democrats	Tracey Neal	1,930	63.1	−0.2
Labour	Kenneth Turner	955	31.2	+3.3
Conservative	Colin Percy	174	5.7	−3.1
Majority		975	31.9	−3.5
Turnout		3,059	31.8	+1.3
Liberal Democrats gain from Labour		Swing		

University
Party	Candidate	Votes	%	±%
Liberal Democrats	Christine Randall	961	56.7	−3.9
Labour	Dan Durcan	408	24.1	−7.1
Independent	June Johnson	157	9.3	+9.3
Conservative	Gordon Dear	120	7.1	−1.1
Green	Aaron Fitzpatrick	48	2.8	+2.8
Majority		553	32.6	+3.2
Turnout		1,694	28.9	−3.2
Liberal Democrats hold		Swing		

No elections were held in Bricknell, Southcoates East, Southcoates West and St Andrews wards.
