= Long live our noble Duke =

Traditional Lancastrian alteration to the British royal anthem 'God Save the King'

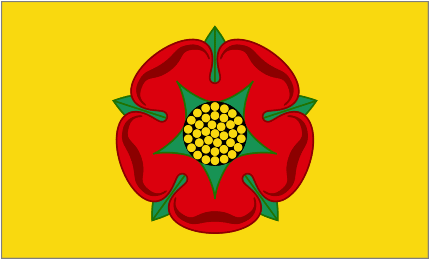
Lancashire flag

"Long live our noble Duke" is an alteration traditionally made within the historic county boundaries of Lancashire (Note: Includes Liverpool, Manchester, Bolton and Southport.) to the anthem "God Save the King". The anthem still uses the same lyrics and instrumental tune, but the second line "Long live our noble King" is changed to "Long live our noble Duke" out of respect to the reigning monarch in his capacity as Duke of Lancaster. The title is always held by the monarch as head of the royal Duchy of Lancaster, historically Lancaster being the county town of Lancashire. No matter if the sovereign is male or female, he always retains the style of duke, therefore the variant second line never changes even if "God save the Queen" changes to "God save the King" and vice versa.

An unofficial Lancashire anthem, it is often used at formal dinners in the historical county and in Lancastrian regiments of the armed forces. This version of the anthem is used every Sunday at the Savoy Chapel which is governed by the Duchy of Lancaster. Another version recorded to have been used at the Savoy Chapel is "God save our Duke the King, Long Live our noble Duke", this being in 1951 when King George VI was monarch. The variant alters lines 1 and 2 in the original national lyrics.

It is still currently used by Old Boys of Lancaster Royal Grammar School.

== Lyrics ==
"God Save the King"	"God Save the King"	"God Save the Duke"
Version 1	Version 2	Version 3
God save our gracious King! Long live our noble Duke! God save the King! Send him victorious, happy and glorious, long to reign over us: God save the King!	God save our Duke the King! Long live our noble Duke! God save the King! Send him victorious, happy and glorious, long to reign over us: God save the King!	God save our gracious Duke! Long live our noble Duke! God save the Duke! Send him victorious, happy and glorious, long to reign over us: God save the Duke!

== See also ==
- Lancashire
- Lancashire Day
- God Save the King
