= Yorkshire Ridings Society =

Yorkshire
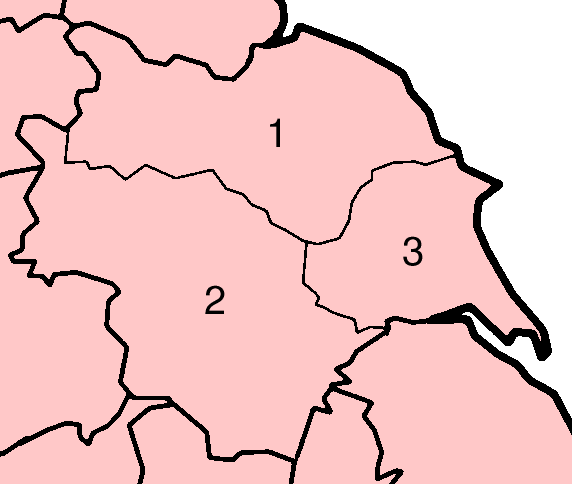
1. North Riding
2. West Riding
3. East Riding

The Yorkshire Ridings Society is a group affiliated to the Association of British Counties calling for the wider recognition of the historic borders of Yorkshire, and its traditional subdivisions, the North, East and West Ridings.

== History ==
The Yorkshire Ridings Society was founded in 1974 in response to the Local Government Act 1972, which it saw, alongside subsequent local government reform, as a threat to Yorkshire's identity. Colin Holt, a founder member, was the long-time chairman of the group until his death in April 2006. The Chairman of 2009 was Councillor Chris Abbott, who died on 8 January 2017.

The group has promoted Yorkshire Day annually on 1 August since 1975 to raise awareness of its cause. The group dates the founding of the county of Yorkshire to 875 AD.

Associated groups include the Saddleworth White Rose Society, which handles Saddleworth (historically in the West Riding, but since 1974 part of Oldham, Greater Manchester), and Unite Craven, who are concerned with the western part of Craven (including Barnoldswick, Earby and the former Bowland Rural District) which was made part of the non-metropolitan county of Lancashire in 1974.

== Aims ==
In 1977 the society's founding committee published What future for Yorkshire? in reply to the Government's white paper on devolution. It proposed as a "starting point":

- The abolition of the county councils created in 1974 as soon as possible.
- The metropolitan boroughs to become "boroughs" or "cities" with the powers of pre-1974 county boroughs.
- Retention of the non-metropolitan districts established in 1974.
- Three new cities or boroughs for York, Hull and Middlesbrough and their hinterlands.
- Possible introduction of a similar borough covering the Selby coalfield.
- County-wide services to be provided by a "consortium" of district councils.
- A Yorkshire Provincial Assembly to cover the pre-1974 Yorkshire Ridings.

According to the society's website, its current aims are:

- Roadside boundary signs to mark the Ridings.
- A Yorkshire address for all parts of Yorkshire.
- Accurate representation of Yorkshire in all respects.
- Local government to more closely reflect Yorkshire's true geography.

== See also ==
- Friends of Real Lancashire

== Bibliography ==
- Bradford, Michael (1988). The Fight for Yorkshire. East Yorkshire: Hutton Press. ISBN 0-907033-66-0.
