= Anthony Bennett (Veritas politician) =

English former attorney (born 1947)

- Born: Anthony John Stuart Bennett; 7 September 1947 (age 79); UK
- Occupations: Rights adviser, researcher and writer

Anthony John Stuart Bennett (born 7 September 1947) is an English former solicitor and former candidate for public office. He was a member of the British political party Veritas and was listed on the database of the Electoral Commission as official leader for three days, before the real leader was revealed as Robert Kilroy-Silk.

In 2006, he began a private prosecution against Michael Barrymore for alleged drugs and drink offences committed on the night Stuart Lubbock was found dead at the entertainer's home. Bennett co-wrote a book with Terry Lubbock, the father of Stuart Lubbock, Not Awight: Getting Away With Murder, explaining their theory that Stuart Lubbock died as a result of a violent attack on him, which Barrymore and his associates that night covered up.

He campaigned against the parents of Madeleine McCann, who disappeared while on a family holiday in Portugal in 2007. He asserted that they should have been prosecuted for child neglect and accused them of covering up what happened to their daughter, a charge which ultimately led to the family successfully pursuing legal action against him.

== Background and family life ==
Bennett was educated at Bournemouth School. He then attended Sheffield University where he was awarded a first class honours Bachelor of Arts degree in geography, and the London School of Economics where he received a Diploma in Social Administration. He also attended University of Nottingham where he was awarded a Certificate of Qualification in Social Work (CQSW) and an M.A., and Hertfordshire University, where he received a Diploma in Management Studies. Bennett is married with two children.

He was employed as the Principal Welfare Rights Adviser for Harlow Council from 1978 to 1987. In 1987, he became head of the Money Advice Unit for Hertfordshire County Council, a post he held until 1992, after which he was admitted as a solicitor in 1995. It has been reported that he worked for the UK Independence Party as a solicitor.

On 9 September 2003, the Solicitors Disciplinary Tribunal found him "guilty of conduct unbefitting a solicitor". On 15 October 2009, he voluntarily removed himself from the Roll.

== Political career ==
Bennett became active in politics when he lived in Derbyshire from 1972 to 1978. In May 1976, he was voted onto North East Derbyshire District Council as an Independent Labour candidate for the Hasland Ward, where he served until 1978. In 1978, he moved to Harlow where, in 1985, he joined Harlow Constituency Labour Party.

Bennett founded two credit unions in the 1980s – the Harlow Community Credit Union in 1980 and, in 1988, the Harlow Council Employees Credit Union. They merged several years later to form HarlowSave Credit Union.

In November 1997, Bennett left the Labour party and joined the United Kingdom Independence Party (UKIP). In April 1999, he became the Campaign Manager for UKIP's Eastern Region campaign and, in July 1999, he became Political Assistant to Jeffrey Titford, UKIP MEP, a post he held until February 2001. In January 2000, he co-founded the UKIP's Metric Martyrs Fund with Jeffrey Titford, and published leaflets encouraging traders to defy the new laws making it an offence to sell fruit, vegetables and other "loose goods" using weighing scales calibrated in pounds and ounces. He stood for the UKIP in Harlow in the 2001 General Election, where he finished fifth with 1,223 votes (3%).

A Eurosceptic, Bennett was a member of The Drive the Flag campaign founded by Leeds businessman Peter Rogers, to allow national flags on vehicle number plates, in the face of proposed government legislation which would have only allowed the European Union (EU) symbol on the number plates. In December 2001, the Government announced that it planned to permit the display of the Union Flag as well as the national flags of England, Scotland and Wales vehicle numberplates in the UK. This was implemented on 27 April 2009 with the caveat that drivers who chose to take advantage of this dispensation need to display a "GB sticker" on their vehicles when driving abroad.

In early 2002, he was banned from holding office in the party in 2004 after he privately circulated a pamphlet in which he called the Islamic prophet, Muhammad, a paedophile for having consummated his marriage to his child bride Aisha when she was nine years old, which Bennett stated would have been prosecuted today as a case of child sexual abuse. The pamphlet also warned of the probable rise of militant Islam in the UK, which were later claimed to be part of a "reasoned, academic exposition" aimed at explaining the reasons behind the 11 September terrorist attacks. UKIP described Bennett as "an energetic campaigner, with some extremely eccentric and individualistic views". On 15 August 2004, Bennett began work as Robert Kilroy-Silk's researcher and became a founder member of the Veritas Party in January 2005. In February 2005, however, Bennett was involved in controversy when it was revealed that he had previously co-founded the People's Campaign to Keep the Pound with Ian Anderson, a former chairman of the far right, white nationalist party, the National Front. Bennett denied any knowledge of Anderson being chairman of the National Front at the time the two men formed the campaign, describing Anderson as an "English patriot".

Bennett was a co-founder of the Campaign for a Referendum on the European Constitution (CREC), which campaigned using purple pre-addressed postcards to send to Queen Elizabeth II, asking her to refuse Royal Assent to any Bill to adopt the EU constitution, until the British people had had the chance to accept or reject it in a referendum.

After Tony Blair agreed to a referendum in May 2004, CREC changed its name to the Campaign to Reject the European Constitution. The CREC maintained that the EU constitution was part of an attempt to create a European superstate. Bennett stood for the Veritas party in Harlow in the 2005 general election, securing 941 votes (2.4%) and finishing fifth out of five just behind UKIP's John Felgate on 981 votes (2.5%).

== Removal of road signs ==
Whilst still a member of UKIP, Bennett co-founded the "Active Resistance to Metrication" (A.R.M.), a pressure group opposed to metrication, in June 2001.

In 2002, as part of a campaign by the group, Bennett removed various road and footpath signs in metres which the group claimed contravened the Traffic Signs Regulations and General Directions 2002. He was prosecuted for an action in Kent where he removed around 40 metric signs. He was found guilty in May 2002 of theft and criminal damage at Maidstone Magistrates' Court. In October 2002, his conviction for theft was overturned by Judge Keith Simpson at Maidstone Crown Court. Judge Simpson upheld the conviction for criminal damage but discharged the sentence, which had been 50 hours of community service to an absolute discharge. Up to September 2004, Bennett was arrested six times as part of the group's campaign to remove metric signs which they claim are illegal. He was charged three times, but received only the one conviction in 2002.

Bennett has since been actively involved in the direct action group CountyWatch, which has relocated road signs marking modern administrative county borders to historic county borders in a number of English counties, including Lancashire. These campaigns were justified by CountyWatch under section 131 of the Highways Act 1980, which allows members of the public to remove road signs which are "not lawfully placed on the highway".

== Private prosecutions ==
=== Stuart Lubbock ===
In January 2006, Bennett started a private prosecution against the entertainer Michael Barrymore over alleged offences involving drink and the possession and use of Class A and Class B drugs by Barrymore during the night when 31-year-old Stuart Lubbock was found dead at Barrymore's house in March 2001. The prosecution was blocked by a District Judge (Magistrates' Court) at Southend-on-Sea Magistrates' Court on the grounds of insufficient evidence. After the decision was made, Bennett announced that he had been acting independently but that he had the support of the Lubbock family. Barrymore released a statement in which he said, "Mr Bennett's motivation to seek the truth as to how Mr Stuart Lubbock received the injuries to his body is absolutely right. I remain totally committed, as I always have been, to continue to pursue the truth. Allegations about drugs on that night have always been a complete irrelevance as to how Stuart Lubbock suffered those injuries. The court held Mr Bennett's misguided application to prosecute me for drugs offences was an abuse of process."

Before the decision was made not to allow the prosecution, Terry Lubbock, the father of Stuart Lubbock, met with Barrymore, when it was alleged that Terry Lubbock told Barrymore he did not blame him for his son's death. Bennett, though, maintained that the private prosecution would proceed, but that he would reconsider if asked to drop the case by the Lubbock family. He added that evidence from the night of Stuart Lubbock's death, made available at the inquest, had not been seen by the Crown Prosecution Service (CPS).

Bennett was secretary of The Lubbock Trust which was founded by Terry Lubbock in late January 2006 and formally wound up a year and half later, on 22 June 2007. He is the co-author, with Terry Lubbock, of a book analysing the events which led to Stuart's violent death, published in June 2007: Not Awight: Getting Away With Murder. Bennett claims Lubbock's death was caused by a violent attack and that there was an elaborate cover-up of the true circumstances of his death including a staged drowning.

On 10 July, Bennett was informed by the Hate Crime Unit at Harlow police station that they had received a complaint about comments attributed to him about the practice of fisting on the Lubbock Trust website. The police said that as someone had accused him of a homophobic hate crime, they were investigating him over a hate crime. Bennett immediately complained to the Chief Constable of Essex, stating that there was no such thing in British Law as a homophobic hate crime. He stated further that, "There is material on the website which is critical of the lifestyle of homosexuals which activists might take exception to, but I don't have a problem with people from gay lobbies contacting us." Bennett believed the complaint was made because of the forthcoming release of the Not Awight book.

The police stated they had received an allegation about homophobic comments being published on the website, and that Essex Police has to investigate all reports of hate crime. They continued that a full investigation was currently being conducted to identify whether offences had been committed. The next day, 11 July, Essex Police Professional Standards Department referred his complaint to the IPCC to investigate.

In a statement on 13 July 2007, which appeared on the Lubbock Trust website, Bennett said that the contents of the site had been agreed by all members of The Trust 13 months earlier, and the reason for including the information was that it related directly to the probable cause of Stuart Lubbock's death. He added that, due to concerns expressed by Lubbock Trust chairman Harry Cichy that some of the material might be seen as 'homophobic', and following a complaint to the website's server, NetPivotal, and a request from them, some of that page had been removed.

Terry Lubbock responded by distancing himself from the controversy saying, "This is a diversion from the campaign which I don't want to take any part in. My aim is as it has always been, to get justice for my son Stuart and that is the only thing in my life now. I'm not going to let anything distract me from that. This latest episode is not doing the campaign a lot of good."

On 13 July 2007, during the launch of Not Awight, Terry Lubbock made a speech, in which he announced that Bennett would no longer be representing him and that The Lubbock Trust was being wound up as most of its original purposes had been achieved. It was further claimed that Lubbock and Bennett had split following the police investigation into Bennett.

On 22 July, Essex Police announced that they had consulted with the CPS and that there would be no further police action. Bennett however, responded by saying that he wanted an outside police force to investigate Essex police's handling of the complaint and the actions of the Essex Police Hate Crimes Unit. He continued, "I have had to endure among other things headlines such as "Gay Hate of Barrymore Accuser" in the Daily Express. I need a full, fair and impartial enquiry by the IPCC into what Essex Police thought they were doing investigating something they must have known from the word go could never have been a crime." In August 2007, it was announced that the police would be taking no further action against the complaint of homophobia on the Lubbock Trust website.

=== Disappearance of Madeleine McCann ===
On 1 August 2007, three months after the disappearance of Madeleine McCann from a holiday apartment in Praia da Luz, Lagos, Portugal, Bennett set up a fund called The Madeleine Foundation to fund a private prosecution for child neglect. In November 2007, he started such a prosecution against the parents of Madeline – Gerry and Kate McCann. The initial hearing was at Loughborough Magistrates' Court where the application was dismissed on the grounds that it was a matter for the Portuguese authorities, and thus beyond the jurisdiction of British courts.

The foundation was formally constituted in January 2008 with Bennett as secretary. One of the actions for which Tony Bennett and the Foundation were criticised by the British press was the leafletting of the village of Rothley where the McCanns live. He referred the articles in the UK media, which called him and others in the Madeleine Foundation "sickos" and "stalkers", to the PCC. The PCC replied that the newspapers had been justified in referring to him and other members of the Foundation in those terms.

After receiving a letter from libel lawyers Carter-Ruck dated 27 August 2009, Bennett gave an undertaking "Not to repeat allegations that the McCanns are guilty of, or are to be suspected of, causing the death of their daughter Madeleine McCann, and/or of disposing of her body, and/or lying about what happened and/or seeking to cover up what they had done". In November 2012, lawyers for the McCann family went to the High Court to argue that Bennett was not abiding by the terms of his undertaking and was continuing to spread false allegations against them. Bennett, in an interview with the Harlow Star, said that he still had valid arguments and that "Britain's libel laws are so oppressive that I had no alternative but to agree to the terms of the formal undertakings set out by the McCanns' lawyers in November 2009".

Bennett was found guilty of contempt of court and, on 21 February 2013, given a three-month suspended prison sentence and ordered to pay the McCanns' court costs. The court had considered 13 representative instances relating to breaches of his undertakings "on well over 100 occasions."
