= Lancashire Day =

County day of historic Lancashire, England

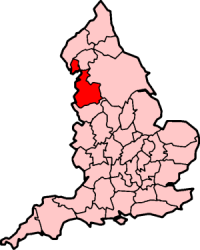
- Lancashire Rose Lancashire county palatine shown within England
- Observed by: Lancashire United Kingdom
- Type: Local
- Date: 27 November
- Next time: 27 November 2025
- Frequency: annual
- First time: 1996

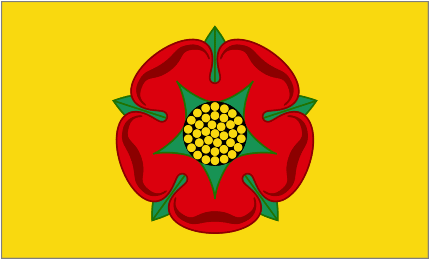
Flag of Lancashire

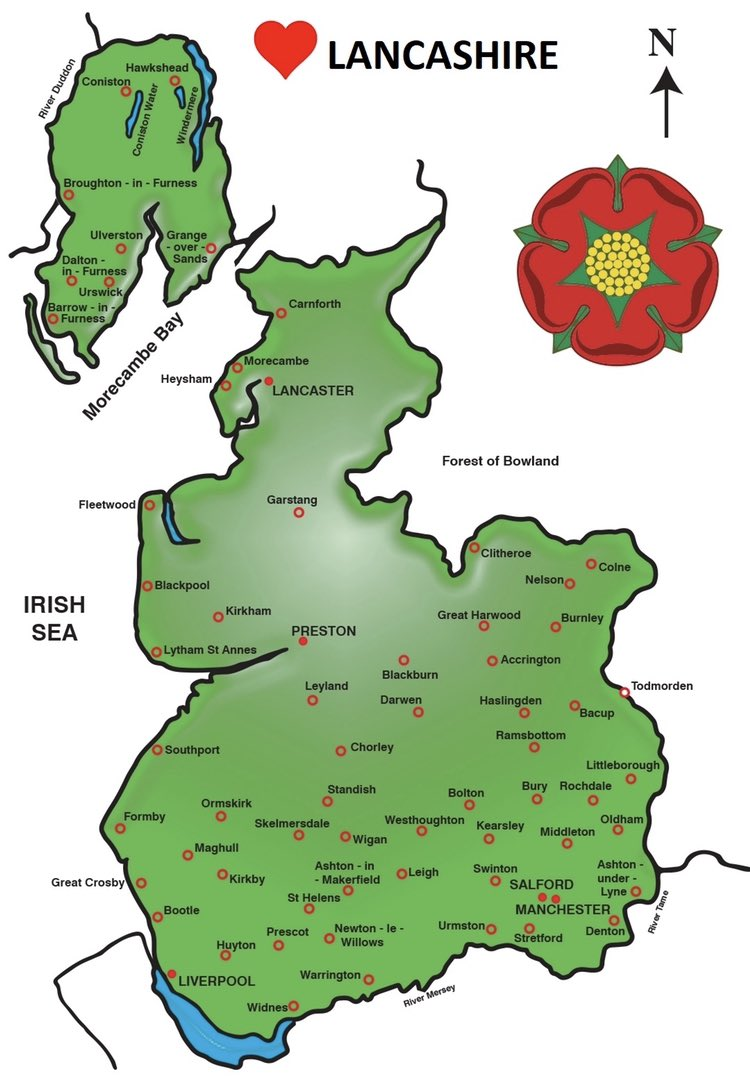
The County Palatine of Lancashire

Lancashire Day is the county day of historic Lancashire in England. It is held on 27 November to commemorate the day in 1295 when Lancashire first sent representatives to Parliament, to attend the Model Parliament of King Edward I. Lancashire Day was first held in 1996.

Organised and coordinated by the Friends of Real Lancashire, it is observed with the loyal toast to "The King, Duke of Lancaster", and is celebrated from everywhere within the county palatine. The day is marked throughout the historic county by town criers announcing the Lancashire Day proclamation which declares the historic regions boundaries of the county, and finishes with "God bless Lancashire, and God save the King, Duke of Lancaster"

The day since has been widely publicised, including reports from the BBC website and in the local press. The day receives support from both district councils and Lancashire County Council. Wigan, Bolton and St Helens Councils have all resolved to support the day every year. Many towns throughout the historic county host events on the day, most notably readings of the Lancashire Day Proclamation. At formal occasions on the day, "Long live our noble Duke", an unofficial Lancashire anthem variant of "God Save the King" is often used in respect to the Duke of Lancaster who is always the reigning monarch.

== See also ==
- Yorkshire Day
