= Colin Holt (activist) =

Former Chairman of the Yorkshire Ridings Society

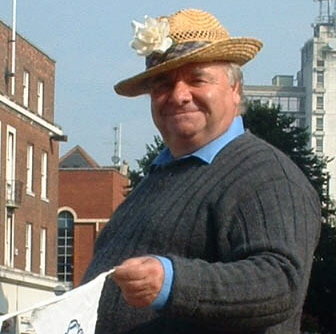
- Colin Holt on Yorkshire Day
- Born: Roland Colin Holt; 1945; Yorkshire, England
- Died: April 2006 (aged 61); Yorkshire, England
- Occupation: Activist
- Years active: 1974–2006
- Movement: Yorkshire identity preservation; anti-Local Government Act 1972
- Spouse: Hilary Holt

Roland Colin Holt, known as Colin Holt (1945–2006) was a Yorkshire activist who was a founder member of the Yorkshire Ridings Society, serving as its chairman for many years until his death. A determined opponent of the Local Government Act 1972 and an advocate for Yorkshire's traditional Ridings, he was responsible for the adoption of Yorkshire Day.

Colin Holt lived in Fenwick near Doncaster. He was a lecturer at Doncaster College. Though best known for vocally championing the cause of Yorkshire, Colin Holt was also a dedicated member of Moss and District Parish Council and a vintage vehicle enthusiast.

He also served on the committee of the Association of British Counties, to which the YRS is affiliated.

== The Yorkshire Ridings Society ==
Holt had an aptitude for generating publicity that he would use throughout his tenure at the Yorkshire Ridings Society. As publicity officer of the Yorkshire Ridings Society, Holt achieved his first publicity coup through his refusal to pay bills addressed to "Fenwick, South Yorkshire" rather than "Fenwick, Yorkshire" or "Fenwick, West Riding". Eventually, after many official letters, British Telecom cut his household off. They were not reconnected for several years. After BT was privatised, the company agreed to make the address read "Yorkshire" and the Holts had their telephone connection back.

He believed strongly in cultural heritage and regional identity. His message was simple and constant: that the sidelining of Yorkshire's ancient North, West and East Ridings, which dated to the ninth century, under local government re-organisation in 1974 was a crime and an insult.

== Yorkshire Day ==
In Colin Holt devised Yorkshire Day, falling on 1 August, as a celebration of all things Yorkshire. He began the tradition, still continued, for members of the YRS, with white roses in their buttonholes, to make a circuit of the ancient city walls of York, reading out a "Yorkshire Declaration of Integrity". The first of August was chosen as the county day because on that day in 1759 that soldiers from Yorkshire regiments who had fought in the Battle of Minden picked white roses as a tribute to fallen comrades.

== Personal life ==
Holt married Hilary in 1968. They would remain married for 38 years, until his death from heart failure in 2006.
