= Death of Stuart Lubbock =

2001 suspicious death at Michael Barrymore's home

Stuart Lubbock
- Born: 1 October 1969
- Died: 31 March 2001 (aged 31); Roydon, Essex, England
- Occupation: Wholesale butcher's supervisor
- Known for: Death under suspicious circumstances at Michael Barrymore's home
- Children: 2

Stuart Lubbock (1 October 1969 – 31 March 2001) was an English meat-factory worker who died under suspicious circumstances at the home of television personality Michael Barrymore on 31 March 2001. Barrymore and two others present – James Futers and Simon Shaw – reported finding Lubbock unconscious in the swimming pool of Barrymore's home in Roydon, Essex, earlier that morning. Lubbock was discovered by the examining pathologist to have suffered serious anal injuries, with traces of ecstasy, cocaine and alcohol in his blood. Barrymore's television career effectively ended as a result of the police investigation and legal action around the case.

== Background ==
According to BBC News, neighbours described Stuart Lubbock as a "pleasant, sociable" man who lived with his father Terry and brother Kevin in a terraced house in Harlow, Essex. At the time of his death, Lubbock had two daughters, aged four and one, who were being brought up by his former partner whom he had left months earlier. Lubbock, a wholesale butcher's supervisor, had visited the Roydon home of television personality Michael Barrymore after meeting him in a local nightclub, the Millennium.

== Inquest ==
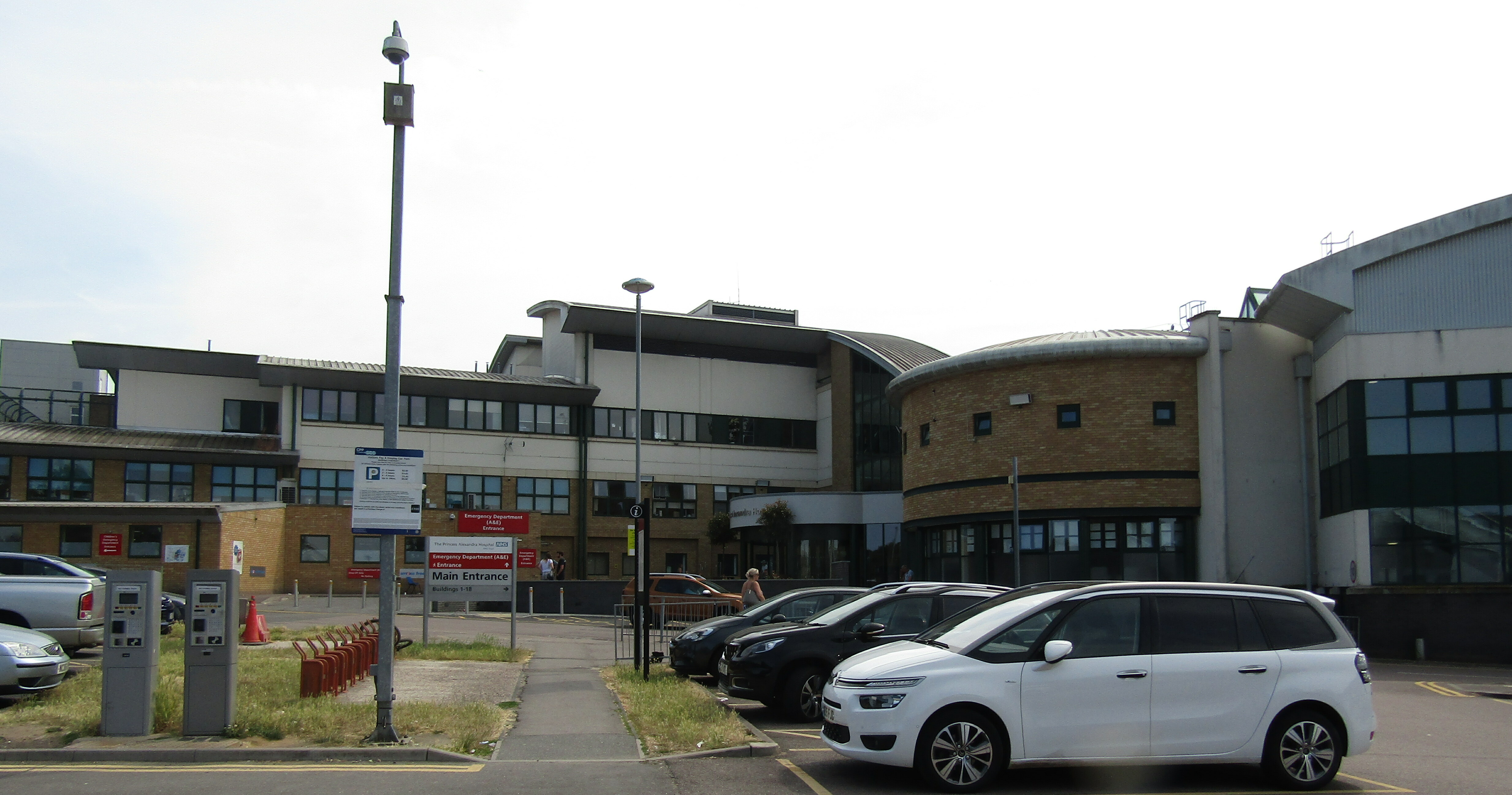
Lubbock was pronounced dead at Princess Alexandra Hospital, Harlow (pictured in 2018)

A September 2002 inquest reached an open verdict: Coroner Caroline Beasley-Murray said, "None of these witnesses who were party guests for three hours have given to this court an explanation about how Stuart Lubbock, a previously fit 31-year-old, should be found floating in a swimming pool at the premises with a significant level of alcohol and drugs in his system and have serious anal injuries."

== Initial investigation dropped ==
Michael Heath, the pathologist at Lubbock's post-mortem, concluded that he had drowned accidentally. Three other pathologists who examined the body said that the marks on Lubbock's forehead suggested that he might have been asphyxiated. None of the pathologists claimed that this was the cause of death, and the marks could have been caused by extensive resuscitation attempts. In January 2006, Heath volunteered to stop working for police after he was criticised for multiple occasions of having drawn conclusions contradictory to other pathologists.

== 2006 developments ==
=== Private prosecution launched, later dismissed by judge ===
On 11 January 2006, Tony Bennett, the Lubbock family's solicitor, issued an application in the Harlow Magistrates Court for Barrymore to be charged with six offences, relating to his actions on the morning of Lubbock's death. Bennett's firm attempted to serve the papers on Barrymore whilst he was appearing on Channel 4's Celebrity Big Brother UK, generating more headlines. This was later thrown out of court by a district judge, who ruled that Barrymore had no case to answer.

=== Inquest witness arrested, charges later dropped ===
On 10 May 2006, Kylie Merritt, a witness at the coroner's inquest, was arrested on suspicion of perjury. Merritt, a witness on the night of Lubbock's death, told the inquest that she saw Barrymore put some cocaine on his finger and rub it on Lubbock's gums. During a lie detector test conducted by tabloid newspaper the News of the World, Merritt later stated that she could not be certain that her allegation was true. On 14 June, the charges against her were dropped.

=== Pathologist discredited ===
On 19 June 2006, Heath was called before a disciplinary tribunal at the Old Bailey. The following day his testimony was discredited. At the hearing, Charles Miskin QC for the Home Office said: "It is the belief of The Home Office that Dr Heath has fallen short of the high standards required by the Secretary of State of forensic pathologists."

=== Case re-opened ===
Lubbock's father Terry set up the Lubbock Trust to campaign for further investigation into the case, and to generate as much publicity as possible. On 2 December 2006, police announced that they were reopening the investigation into Lubbock's death.

== Investigation by Independent Police Complaints Commission ==
Following a dossier on the case presented to the Independent Police Complaints Commission (IPCC) by Terry Lubbock's lawyer Tony Bennett on 1 December 2006, the IPCC approved an investigation by an outside police force into over 30 separate allegations of incompetence and possible corruption by Essex Police. The allegations pertain to their initial £8 million investigation into Stuart Lubbock's death. In April 2007, the IPCC elevated this investigation, internally managed and run, and appointed former Hertfordshire Police Officer Adrian Tapp to head the investigation. In May 2007, the IPCC agreed with Bennett that a total of 38 separate complaints about Essex Police would be investigated.

Terry Lubbock died from cancer on 15 September 2021, at the age of 76. A friend said, "He's died sad, because he's died knowing people never knew the truth about what happened. But no one could have fought harder for their son. A new inquest was what really mattered to him. He had lost faith in the police. Sadly, he's died not knowing whether there will be another inquest."

== 2007 arrests ==
On 14 June 2007, three men were arrested in connection with Lubbock's death. Michael Barrymore was one arrested on suspicion of murder. On 15 June, Barrymore was released without charge after being questioned.

== Civil action by Barrymore against Essex Police (2015–2017) ==
In July 2015, Barrymore sued Essex Police for damages to his reputation and career, valuing his claim at more than £2.4 million. Essex Police subsequently acknowledged that Barrymore had been wrongfully arrested, although this was due to administrative errors, and not to a lack of evidence.

In August 2017, the High Court in London ruled that Barrymore would be entitled to "more than nominal" damages against Essex Police. This decision was overturned in 2019 by the Court of Appeal, which ruled that he would be entitled only to "nominal" damages. Essex Police subsequently announced that Barrymore had dropped his compensation claim, and that no payments had been made to him.

== Channel 4 documentary, renewed appeal, and arrest (2020–2021) ==
On 4 February 2020, Essex Police offered a £20,000 reward for information leading to a conviction. The cash reward, funded by Essex Police and the charity Crimestoppers, was in response to a new Channel 4 documentary on the incident, Barrymore: The Body in the Pool, which aired on 6 February 2020.

On 17 March 2021, Essex Police confirmed that they had arrested a 50-year-old man from Cheshire on suspicion of indecent assault and murder. He was later released without charge.

Lucy Morris of Essex Police stated, "Nine people were at that party. We know that not everyone was responsible for what happened but someone was. Now is the time to come forward, if you haven't done so already, to set this matter to rest by providing us with any information you have." She emphasised Essex Police had "never given up on this case" and investigations were complex.

Following Terry Lubbock's death, Detective Chief Inspector Jennings said, "Terry's devotion to his son and to his pursuit of justice knew no bounds. He was an example to many of us in his relentless quest for truth and justice. Our investigation into Stuart's death will not end with Terry's – as long as the case remains open, we will do all we can to deliver justice for him and his family. To this end we urge anyone who has information about Stuart's death to please now, more than ever, do the right thing and come forward."
