= 2007 Bolton Metropolitan Borough Council election =

2007 UK local election

Results of the 2007 Bolton Metropolitan Borough Council election

Elections to Bolton Metropolitan Borough Council were held on 3 May 2007. One third of the council was up for election and the council stayed under no overall control.

20 seats were contested with the Labour Party winning 10 seats, the Conservatives 7 and the Liberal Democrats 3.

After the election, the composition of the council was

- Labour 26
- Conservative 22
- Liberal Democrat 12

== Election result ==
Bolton local election result 2007
Party	Seats	Gains	Losses	Net gain/loss	Seats %	Votes %	Votes	+/−
Labour	10	2	0	+2		36.5	24,426	-1.2
Conservative	7	2	1	+1		39.8	26,637	-0.3
Liberal Democrats	3	0	3	-3		19.7	13,187	+0.8
Green	0	0	0	0	0	3.2	2,148	+1.0
BNP	0	0	0	0	0	0.8	524	+0.8
Veritas	0	0	0	0	0	0.1	74	-0.3

== Council Composition ==
Prior to the election the composition of the council was:

↓
22	21	17
Labour	Conservative	Lib Dems

After the election the composition of the council was:

↓
26	22	12
Labour	Conservative	Lib Dems

== Ward results ==
=== Astley Bridge ward ===
Astley Bridge ward
Party	Candidate	Votes	%	±%
Conservative	Stuart Lever	1,989	57.7	−12.3
Labour	Joe Hayes	822	23.8	+4.0
Liberal Democrats	Clive Atty	639	18.5	+8.4
Majority		1,167	33.8	−13.0
Turnout		3,450	33.5	−2.5
Conservative hold		Swing	Con to LD 10.3	

=== Bradshaw ward ===
Bradshaw ward
Party	Candidate	Votes	%	±%
Conservative	Diana Brierley	2,334	65.5	+1.2
Labour	Jim Cottam	618	17.3	−3.5
Liberal Democrats	Steve Howarth	446	12.5	−2.4
Green	Anne Mumberson	167	4.7	+4.7
Majority		1,716	48.1	+4.6
Turnout		3,565	38.8	−0.2
Conservative hold		Swing	Labour to Green 4.1	

=== Breightmet ward ===
Breightmet ward
Party	Candidate	Votes	%	±%
Labour	John Byrne	1,691	48.3	+2.7
Conservative	Arthur Norris	1,431	40.9	−2.3
Liberal Democrats	Edward Rae Hill	241	6.9	−4.3
Green	Lynne Hyland	140	4.0	+4.0
Majority		260	7.4	+5.0
Turnout		3,503	34.6	+3.6
Labour hold		Swing	LD to Green 4.1	

=== Bromley Cross ward ===
Bromley Cross ward
Party	Candidate	Votes	%	±%
Conservative	Norman Critchley	2,784	66.7	+1.7
Labour	Anthony Muscat Terrible	677	16.2	−0.8
Liberal Democrats	Christine MacPherson	362	8.7	−2.3
Green	Liz Spencer	350	8.4	+1.4
Majority		2,107	50.5	+2.6
Turnout		4,173	39.6	−0.4
Conservative hold		Swing	LD to Con 2.0	

=== Crompton ward ===
Crompton ward
Party	Candidate	Votes	%	±%
Labour	Emma Scowcroft	1,662	52.3	+7.6
Conservative	Don Fairclough	1,035	32.6	+10.8
Liberal Democrats	Anne Warren	482	15.2	−11.0
Majority		627	19.7	+1.2
Turnout		3,179	30.7	−12.3
Labour gain from Liberal Democrats		Swing	LD to Con 10.9	

=== Farnworth ward ===
Farnworth ward
Party	Candidate	Votes	%	±%
Labour	Jean Cottam	1,107	42.5	−16.4
Liberal Democrats	Tariq Aziz	920	35.3	+17.4
Conservative	Ruth Kenny	399	15.3	−7.8
Green	Ria Greenhalgh	179	6.9	+6.9
Majority		187	7.2	−28.6
Turnout		2,605	24.0	+3.0
Labour hold		Swing	Labour to LD 16.9	

=== Great Lever ward ===
Great Lever ward
Party	Candidate	Votes	%	±%
Labour	Madeline Murray	1,601	47.1	−11.6
Conservative	Mohammad Idrees	1,276	37.5	+16.7
Liberal Democrats	Wendy Connor	306	9.0	−1.4
Green	Alan Johnson	219	6.4	−3.8
Majority		325	9.5	−28.4
Turnout		3,402	34.9	−3.0
Labour gain from Conservative		Swing	Labour to Con 14.1	

=== Halliwell ward ===
Halliwell ward
Party	Candidate	Votes	%	±%
Labour	Linda Thomas	1,802	64.8	−4.6
Conservative	Martin Grindrod	517	18.6	+0.3
Liberal Democrats	Martin McLoughlin	463	16.6	+4.4
Majority		1,285	46.2	−4.9
Turnout		2,782	28.5	−5.5
Labour hold		Swing	Labour to LD 4.5	

=== Harper Green ward ===
Harper Green ward
Party	Candidate	Votes	%	±%
Labour	Margaret Clare	1,182	50.9	+1.5
Conservative	Robert Tyler	719	31.0	−0.8
Liberal Democrats	Dave Connor	419	18.1	−0.7
Majority		463	19.9	+2.3
Turnout		2,320	23.4	−1.6
Labour hold		Swing	Con to Labour 1.1	

=== Heaton and Lostock ward ===
Heaton and Lostock ward
Party	Candidate	Votes	%	±%
Conservative	Bob Allen	3,199	68.9	−0.1
Labour	John Gillatt	908	19.5	+2.3
Liberal Democrats	Jonathon Evans	538	11.6	−2.2
Majority		2,291	49.3	−2.5
Turnout		4,645	43.9	−2.1
Conservative hold		Swing	LD to Labour 2.2	

=== Horwich and Blackrod ward ===
Horwich and Blackrod ward
Party	Candidate	Votes	%	±%
Conservative	John Raymond Barrow	1,325	41.2	+6.1
Labour	Isabel Seddon	1,162	36.1	+2.4
Liberal Democrats	Peter McGeehan	731	22.7	−8.5
Majority		163	5.1	
Turnout		3,218	33.6	−1.4
Conservative gain from Liberal Democrats		Swing	LD to Con 7.3	

=== Horwich North East ward ===
Horwich North East ward
Party	Candidate	Votes	%	±%
Liberal Democrats	Robert Ronson	1,807	49.8	+9.8
Conservative	Stephen Wallan	1,038	28.6	−3.7
Labour	Kevan Jones	787	21.7	−6.0
Majority		769	21.2	+13.5
Turnout		3,632	36.8	−1.2
Liberal Democrats hold		Swing	Labour to LD 7.9	

=== Hulton ward ===
Hulton ward
Party	Candidate	Votes	%	±%
Conservative	Phillip Ascroft	1,692	52.5	−1.0
Labour	Michael Francis	1,088	33.8	+1.5
Liberal Democrats	Linden Greensitt	441	13.7	−0.5
Majority		604	18.7	−2.5
Turnout		3,221	32.2	−0.8
Conservative hold		Swing	Con to Labour 1.2	

=== Kearsley ward ===
Kearsley ward
Party	Candidate	Votes	%	±%
Liberal Democrats	Margaret Rothwell	1,215	42.4	+2.8
Labour	Guy Harkin	1,188	41.5	−1.0
Conservative	Diane Bamber	463	16.2	−1.7
Majority		27	0.9	
Turnout		2,866	28.4	+0.4
Liberal Democrats hold		Swing	Con to LD 2.0	

=== Little Lever and Darcy Lever ward ===
Little Lever and Darcy Lever ward
Party	Candidate	Votes	%	±%
Labour	Anthony Connell	1,667	43.2	+1.2
Conservative	Rees Gibbon	1,596	41.3	+3.2
Liberal Democrats	Eric Hyde	323	8.4	+0.4
Green	Alwynne Cartmell	275	7.1	−1.1
Majority		71	1.8	−2.1
Turnout		3,861	39.8	−0.2
Labour hold		Swing	Green to Con 2.1	

=== Rumworth ward ===
Rumworth ward
Party	Candidate	Votes	%	±%
Labour	Ebrahim Adia	2,079	64.4	−4.1
Conservative	John (Jack) Heyes	668	20.7	−10.8
Liberal Democrats	Sandra Bridger	480	14.9	+14.9
Majority		1,411	43.7	+6.7
Turnout		3,227	31.1	+2.1
Labour hold		Swing	Con to LD 12.8	

=== Smithills ward ===
Smithills ward
Party	Candidate	Votes	%	±%
Liberal Democrats	Carole Swarbrick	1,763	47.6	+5.2
Conservative	Dennis Bray	1,044	28.2	−6.9
Labour	James Shaw	680	18.4	−4.1
Green	Rachel Mann	218	5.9	+5.9
Majority		719	19.4	+12.1
Turnout		3,705	36.7	−1.3
Liberal Democrats hold		Swing	Con to Green 6.4	

=== Tonge with the Haulgh ward ===
Tonge with the Haulgh ward
Party	Candidate	Votes	%	±%
Labour	Elaine Sherrington	1,463	44.9	−9.3
Conservative	Nigel Ford	831	25.5	−4.1
BNP	David Wood	524	16.1	+16.1
Liberal Democrats	Rosalind Harasiwka	236	7.2	−1.3
Green	James Tomkinson	133	4.7	−3.6
Veritas	Anthony Backhouse	74	2.3	+2.3
Majority		632	19.4	−5.2
Turnout		3,261	34.6	+3.6
Labour hold		Swing	Labour to BNP 12.7	

=== Weshoughton North and Chew Moor ward ===
Weshoughton North and Chew Moor ward
Party	Candidate	Votes	%	±%
Conservative	June Patricia Allen	1,482	41.9	−1.2
Labour	Arthur Price	1,219	34.4	+1.2
Liberal Democrats	Ronald Halliwell	651	18.4	+3.5
Green	Laura Spencer	188	5.3	−3.5
Majority		263	7.4	−2.5
Turnout		3,540	33.7	−1.3
Conservative gain from Liberal Democrats		Swing	Green to LD 3.5	

=== Weshoughton South ward ===
Weshoughton South ward
Party	Candidate	Votes	%	±%
Labour	David Chadwick	1,023	36.0	+2.7
Conservative	Christine Wild	815	28.7	−1.7
Liberal Democrats	Pamela Rigby	724	25.5	−10.8
Green	Eric Hyland	279	9.8	+9.8
Majority		208	7.3	
Turnout		2,841	30.0	+0.0
Labour gain from Liberal Democrats		Swing	LD to Green 9.3	
