= 2006 Hull City Council election =

2006 UK local government election

Map of the results of the 2006 Hull council election. Labour in red, Liberal Democrats in yellow, Conservatives in blue, Independent in grey, Hull Independents in white, Uncontested in cream.

The 2006 Hull City Council election took place on 4 May 2006 to elect members of Hull City Council in England. One third of the council was up for election and the council stayed under no overall control. Overall turnout was 27.3%.

Before the election in April 2006 the national Labour government removed their "statutory direction" of the council which had been put in place in 2003 after inspectors criticised the performance of the council. The council was now described as having made adequate progress, but the opposition Liberal Democrats criticised the timing of the announcement during the campaign for the local elections.

The results saw the Liberal Democrats become the largest party on the council after gaining 4 seats including defeating the Labour Lord Mayor, Bryan Bradley. However immediately after the election they were not confident they would be able to get enough support from other parties to take control from Labour. Following the election the 2 Liberal and 3 of the various independent councillors met with the Labour leader of the council to discuss supporting them as they preferred Labour to the Liberal Democrats. However it was reported that regional Labour party officials told the party to go into opposition raising the possibility that neither party would form the administration.

At the council meeting on 18 May the Liberal Democrats managed to get elected into power by one vote after receiving the support of 4 councillors from other groups, including the former Labour leader of the council Colin Inglis. He had promised to oppose Labour forming the administration if 2 of the councillors who had been involved in removing him as leader were part of any Labour cabinet.

After the election, the composition of the council was

- Liberal Democrat 26
- Labour 25
- Conservative 2
- Hull Independents 2
- Independent 2
- Liberal Party 2

== Election result ==
Hull local election result 2006
Party	Seats	Gains	Losses	Net gain/loss	Seats %	Votes %	Votes	+/−
Liberal Democrats	10	4	0	+4	50.0	43.6	19,076	+6.2%
Labour	7	0	2	-2	35.0	33.3	14,585	-1.0%
Conservative	1	0	0	0	5.0	11.4	5,011	+0.2%
Hull Independents	1	0	1	-1	5.0	4.4	1,908	+4.4%
Independent	1	0	0	0	5.0	3.0	1,327	-3.9%
BNP	0	0	0	0	0	2.5	1,108	+0.5%
Liberal	0	0	1	-1	0	0.8	353	+0.8%
UKIP	0	0	0	0	0	0.3	143	-6.8%
Legalise Cannabis	0	0	0	0	0	0.2	103	+0.0%
Veritas	0	0	0	0	0	0.2	102	+0.2%
Mums' Army	0	0	0	0	0	0.2	69	+0.2%

== Ward results ==
Avenue
Party	Candidate	Votes	%	±%
Liberal Democrats	Simone Butterworth	1,441	50.5	+3.9
Labour	Graham Petrini	690	24.2	+0.8
Conservative	Basil Bulmer	229	8.0	−2.5
Hull Independents	Ginette Andrew	210	7.4	+2.2
Independent	Haris Livas-Dawes	179	6.3	+6.3
Legalise Cannabis	Carl Wagner	103	3.6	+3.6
Majority		751	26.3	+3.1
Turnout		2,852	31.8	
Liberal Democrats hold		Swing		

Boothferry
Party	Candidate	Votes	%	±%
Liberal Democrats	Patricia Ellis	1,626	57.6	+16.2
Labour	Freda Longbottom	716	25.4	−1.4
Conservative	Karen Woods	482	17.1	+2.7
Majority		910	32.2	+17.6
Turnout		2,824	29.7	
Liberal Democrats hold		Swing		

Bransholme East
Party	Candidate	Votes	%	±%
Hull Independents	Anita Harrison	867	64.2	+23.9
Labour	Daniel McIntyre	291	21.5	−11.8
Liberal Democrats	Maureen Bristow	115	8.5	−12.0
Veritas	Harold Nielson	78	5.8	+5.8
Majority		576	42.7	+35.7
Turnout		1,351	22.4	
Independent hold		Swing		

Bransholme West
Party	Candidate	Votes	%	±%
Labour	Leonard Bird	625	61.3	−7.9
Liberal Democrats	Richard Welton	394	38.7	+25.1
Majority		231	22.6	−33.0
Turnout		1,019	17.7	
Labour hold		Swing		

Bricknell
Party	Candidate	Votes	%	±%
Conservative	John Fareham	1,607	65.7	+5.0
Labour	Kay Vandebriele	434	17.7	−3.6
Liberal Democrats	Stuart Bell	406	16.6	−1.4
Majority		1,173	48.0	+8.6
Turnout		2,447	38.7	
Conservative hold		Swing		

Derringham
Party	Candidate	Votes	%	±%
Liberal Democrats	Stephen Hull	1,110	42.3	+33.3
Hull Independents	Chris Jarvis	831	31.7	+3.5
Labour	Simon Kelsey	436	16.6	−9.2
Conservative	Peter Abraham	153	5.8	−2.7
Liberal	David Harris	93	3.5	+3.5
Majority		279	10.6	
Turnout		2,623	29.8	
Liberal Democrats gain from Independent		Swing		

Drypool
Party	Candidate	Votes	%	±%
Liberal Democrats	Andrew Sloan	1,595	55.6	+15.6
Labour	Jill Wareing	1,050	36.6	+5.0
Conservative	James Parker	223	7.8	+2.0
Majority		545	19.0	+10.6
Turnout		2,868	30.4	
Liberal Democrats gain from Liberal		Swing		

Holderness
Party	Candidate	Votes	%	±%
Liberal Democrats	Stephen Baker	1,967	64.9	+9.8
Labour	Martin Mancey	768	25.3	−7.1
Conservative	Albert Greendale	295	9.7	−2.7
Majority		1,199	39.6	+16.9
Turnout		3,030	30.3	
Liberal Democrats hold		Swing		

Ings
Party	Candidate	Votes	%	±%
Liberal Democrats	Mervyn Taylor	2,017	61.0	+9.9
Labour	Peter Clark	997	30.1	−5.4
Conservative	Andrew Clark	224	6.8	−0.9
Independent	John Reeve	71	2.1	−3.7
Majority		1,020	30.9	+15.3
Turnout		3,309	34.0	
Liberal Democrats gain from Labour		Swing		

Longhill
Party	Candidate	Votes	%	±%
Labour	Alice Hewitt	1,033	52.2	+1.7
Liberal Democrats	Ann Godden	614	31.0	+14.3
Conservative	Robert Brown	332	16.8	+6.5
Majority		419	21.2	−6.8
Turnout		1,979	23.1	
Labour hold		Swing		

Marfleet
Party	Candidate	Votes	%	±%
Labour	Sean Chaytor	1,023	60.5	+0.8
Liberal Democrats	Joseph Matthews	452	26.7	+1.1
Conservative	John Abbott	217	12.8	+12.8
Majority		571	33.8	−0.3
Turnout		1,692	19.4	
Labour hold		Swing		

Myton
Party	Candidate	Votes	%	±%
Labour	Kenneth Branson	1,103	52.3	+0.7
Liberal Democrats	Brian Woodward	413	19.6	+2.2
BNP	Terry Symons	342	16.2	+16.2
Conservative	Colin Baxter	252	11.9	+2.1
Majority		690	32.7	−1.5
Turnout		2,110	22.3	
Labour hold		Swing		

Newington
Party	Candidate	Votes	%	±%
Liberal Democrats	Damian Walker	974	52.3	+35.3
Labour	Bryan Bradley	582	31.2	−5.3
BNP	Jonathan Mainprize	211	11.3	+11.3
Conservative	David Thompson	73	3.9	−6.2
Veritas	Peter Mawer	24	1.3	+1.3
Majority		392	21.1	
Turnout		1,864	21.4	
Liberal Democrats gain from Labour		Swing		

Orchard Park and Greenwood
Party	Candidate	Votes	%	±%
Independent	Terence Geraghty	1,077	52.6	+22.4
Labour	Kathryn Nicholson	716	35.0	−18.5
Liberal Democrats	Angela Simpson	157	7.7	−8.6
Conservative	Ian Brown	98	4.8	+4.8
Majority		361	17.6	
Turnout		2,048	22.5	
Independent hold		Swing		

Pickering
Party	Candidate	Votes	%	±%
Liberal Democrats	Abigail Walker	1,436	47.3	+16.5
Labour	Alan Gardiner	859	28.3	−5.5
BNP	Edward Scott	451	14.9	+2.2
Conservative	Reginald Britton	181	6.0	−3.6
Liberal	Alan Monkman	108	3.6	+3.6
Majority		577	19.0	
Turnout		3,035	33.8	
Liberal Democrats hold		Swing		

St Andrews
Party	Candidate	Votes	%	±%
Labour	Nadine Fudge	467	37.0	+12.4
Liberal Democrats	Amanda Blexill	419	33.2	−18.5
Liberal	Patricia Penna	152	12.0	+12.0
BNP	Alan Siddle	104	8.2	+8.2
Mums' Army	Karen Rouse-Deane	69	5.5	+5.5
Conservative	Robert Cook	51	4.0	−2.2
Majority		48	3.8	
Turnout		1,262	23.8	
Labour hold		Swing		

Southcoates East
Party	Candidate	Votes	%	±%
Labour	David Gemmel	573	55.4	−4.8
Liberal Democrats	James Morrell	213	20.6	+0.7
UKIP	Christopher Goss	143	13.8	+13.8
Conservative	Douglas Percy	106	10.2	+10.2
Majority		360	34.8	−5.5
Turnout		1,035	18.3	
Labour hold		Swing		

Southcoates West
Party	Candidate	Votes	%	±%
Labour	Stephen Brady	824	49.8	+4.5
Liberal Democrats	Martin Uzzell	751	45.4	+2.3
Conservative	Leslie Fisher	79	4.8	−6.8
Majority		73	4.4	+2.2
Turnout		1,654	27.5	
Labour hold		Swing		

Sutton
Party	Candidate	Votes	%	±%
Liberal Democrats	Paul Hepton	1,827	63.3	+5.8
Labour	Elizabeth Noble	807	27.9	+1.4
Conservative	Sheila Airey	254	8.8	+3.5
Majority		1,020	35.4	+4.4
Turnout		2,888	30.5	
Liberal Democrats hold		Swing		

University
Party	Candidate	Votes	%	±%
Liberal Democrats	Chris Randall	1,149	60.6	+12.9
Labour	Robert Silby	591	31.2	−11.2
Conservative	Gordon Dear	155	8.2	+1.0
Majority		558	29.4	+24.1
Turnout		1,895	32.1	
Liberal Democrats hold		Swing		

No elections were held in Beverley, Kings Park and Newland wards.
