= Royal Oak, County Durham =

Hamlet in County Durham, England

Coordinates: 54.607°N 1.681°W

Royal Oak
- Location within County Durham
- OS grid reference: NZ207236
- Civil parish: Heighington
- Unitary authority: Darlington
- Ceremonial county: County Durham
- Region: North East
- Country: England
- Sovereign state: United Kingdom
- Post town: DARLINGTON
- Postcode district: DL2
- Police: Durham
- Fire: County Durham and Darlington
- Ambulance: North East

Royal Oak is a hamlet in the west of Heighington civil parish, in the Borough of Darlington, County Durham, in England. It is situated to the north west of Darlington.
