= Veritas (political party) =

- Founder: Robert Kilroy-Silk
- Founded: 2 February 2005
- Dissolved: 14 June 2015
- Split from: UKIP
- Merged into: English Democrats
- Headquarters: London
- Membership: 1,100
- Ideology: Euroscepticism; Anti-immigration
- Political position: Right-wing
- National affiliation: Alliance for Democracy (2010)
- Colours: Purple

Veritas (Latin: truth) was a right-wing, Eurosceptic political party in the United Kingdom, launched in June 2005 by Robert Kilroy-Silk, Member of the European Parliament (MEP) for the East Midlands, following a split with the UK Independence Party (UKIP). Kilroy-Silk served as party leader through the 2005 General Election, in which the party fielded 65 candidates receiving a total of 40,481 votes (0.1%).

Kilroy-Silk subsequently resigned after failing to win any parliamentary seats, and was succeeded by Patrick Eston, who resigned in 2008 citing frustrations of his efforts to reform the party. The party merged into the English Democrats in June 2015.

Veritas had no representation in Parliament, although Kilroy-Silk sat in the European Parliament, and the party had two London Assembly members, originally elected as UKIP candidates and defecting upon Veritas' formation. Perennial candidate Winston McKenzie was a member of Veritas, standing in the seat of Croydon North in 2005.

== History ==
=== Background ===
Robert Kilroy-Silk, a former Labour Member of Parliament (MP) and television presenter, was elected as a UKIP Member of the European Parliament (MEP) in the 2004 European Parliament election for the East Midlands region. In October 2004, Kilroy-Silk expressed his ambition to lead UKIP, and criticised party leader Roger Knapman. To avoid disciplinary action from other UKIP MEPs, Kilroy-Silk resigned the party whip, while remaining a member and asserting his continued challenge. The plan ultimately failed, and he eventually resigned from UKIP on 20 January 2005, with it being widely speculated that he would set up a party of his own, called 'Veritas' (Latin for "truth").

=== Establishment ===
Veritas was officially founded at a press conference on 2 February 2005, during which Kilroy-Silk proclaimed "unlike the old parties, we shall be honest, open and straight", devoid of the other parties' "lies and spin". He also confirmed that the new party had seven branches and 250 members. There were a number of defections to the new party, including both UKIP London Assembly members, Damian Hockney, who became Veritas deputy leader, and Peter Hulme-Cross.

The party was immediately lambasted as nothing more than a vanity vehicle for Kilroy-Silk, and was nicknamed "Vanitas" by former allies. Anthony Bennett, whose name was listed by the Electoral Commission as the party's leader, was linked to a former chairman of the National Front.

When the party launched its election manifesto in June 2005, its primary policy was leaving the European Union, and it was perceived to be more specific than UKIP's general euroscepticism, almost to the point of Veritas being labelled a single-issue party. It also called for strict immigration controls, a 22% flat rate of income tax, tougher sentences for crime and anti-social behaviour, and the eviction of travellers from illegal sites.

The manifesto was described as "a mix of English nationalism, Old Labour big-strategy socialism and traditional liberal values".

=== 2005 general election ===
At the 2005 general election Veritas had hoped to overtake UKIP as the primary party opposing the European Union. Prior to the election, The Times newspaper had reported that Veritas had selected 120 candidates, planning to stand in every constituency across Great Britain. The party ended up fielding 65 candidates in England and Wales, receiving a total of 40,481 votes (0.1%).

Kilroy-Silk himself contested the constituency of Erewash in Derbyshire. He came fourth with 2,957 votes (5.8%); Liz Blackman was elected for Labour with 22,472. No Veritas candidates were elected; Kilroy-Silk was the only one to save his election deposit.

In the subsequent Cheadle by-election held on 14 July the Veritas candidate polled 218 votes (0.6%).

=== Aftermath of 2005 general election ===
In the wake of the poor showing in the general election, some discontented party members came to oppose Kilroy-Silk and formed the Veritas Members Association (VMA). One of its founders, Ken Wharton, challenged Kilroy-Silk for the leadership on 12 July 2005, during the Cheadle by-election campaign but his challenge faltered due to ill health.

Kilroy-Silk resigned as party leader on 29 July 2005. In a press statement he said:

"It was clear from the general election result – and more recently that of the Cheadle by-election – that the electors are content with the old parties and that it would be virtually impossible for a new party to make a significant impact given the nature of our electoral system. We tried and failed".

Further resignations included that of his chief of staff, David Soutter, and deputy leader Damian Hockney. Hockney and Peter Hulme-Cross subsequently formed the One London party.

A leadership election was held at the party's inaugural Annual General Meeting (AGM) on 18 September 2005. Acting leader Patrick Eston defeated Foreign Affairs Spokesperson Colin Brown, and former boxer Winston McKenzie on a 22% turnout. Eston appointed a deputy, Howard Martin, who was the main Veritas Party spokesperson, and seemed determined to continue with the party, despite the depletion of the Veritas membership.

=== 2005–2015 ===
At the 2006 local elections, Veritas stood four candidates: two each in Kingston-upon-Hull and Bolton. In the 2007 elections, Veritas stood three candidates: two at council elections and one – Iain James Sheldon in the Mid and West Wales Region for the Welsh Assembly, who gathered 502 votes (0.2%).

On 15 June 2008, Patrick Eston announced that he could not take the Veritas Party in the direction he wanted and so would be resigning the party leadership.

Therese Muchewicz, Party Secretary, served as Acting Leader until leadership elections in October 2008, and was subsequently elected as the new Party Leader.

On 18 December 2015, members of the English Democrats voted to merge with Veritas.

== Electoral performance ==
=== House of Commons ===
2005 general election results
% of vote	Candidate	Constituency	Number of votes
5.8	Robert Kilroy-Silk	Erewash	2957
4.0	Colin Brown	Leicester East	1666
3.6	Tony Martin	City of Durham	1603
3.4	John Burdon	Hemsworth	1247
3.2	Steve Wallis	Hull West & Hessle	889
3.0	Patrick Eston	Tamworth	1320
2.7	Michael Harvey	Mansfield	1034
2.6	Jim Wright	Aberavon	768
2.6	Alex Stevenson	Amber Valley	1224
2.6	Sarah Hemstock	Ashfield	1108
2.4	Graham Morris	Hull East	750
2.4	Tony Bennett	Harlow	941
2.3	Edward Spalton	Derbyshire South	1272
2.2	Martin Bardoe	Derby North	958
2.2	Ian Taylor	Stoke-on-Trent North	689
2.1	Grant Allen	Stoke-on-Trent South	1272
1.9	Brian Buxton	Burton	913
1.9	John Scott	Macclesfield	848
1.7	Tony Smith	Poplar & Canning Town	650
1.5	Howard Martin	Bedfordshire Mid	769
1.4	Barrie Wilkins	Daventry	822
1.4	Frank Leeming	Derby South	608
1.4	Kenneth Roseblade	Leicester South	573
1.4	Duncan Shelley	Rutland & Melton	696
1.4	Nick Alex	Wellingborough	749
1.3	David Davis	Darlington	507
1.3	Tineke Robinson	Hull North	389
1.3	John McVay	Loughborough	588
1.3	Marian Harvey-Lover	Newcastle-under-Lyme	518
1.2	Therese Muchewicz	Bradford South	421
1.2	Damian Hockney	Broxtowe	590
1.2	Debbie Le May	Hertford & Stortford	572
1.2	Yvonne Holley	Swansea West	401
1.2	Gene Alcantara	West Ham	365
1.1	David Jones	Bolton South East	343
1.1	Helen Martinek	Colne Valley	543
1.1	David Malindine	Ealing North	495
1.1	Daniel Moss	Rushcliffe	624
1.0	Alan Ainscow	Bolton North East	375
1.0	Graham Dare	Croydon South	497
1.0	Roger Meekins	Mole Valley	507
0.9	Anne Assheton-Salton	Cornwall South East	459
0.9	Deborah Johnson	Gedling	411
0.9	Tony Green	Northampton South	508
0.9	Carl Faulkener	Rochdale	353
0.9	Trevor Hackett	Saffron Walden	475
0.9	Carleton Beaman	Somerset & Frome	484
0.8	Brian Greaves	Barrow & Furness	306
0.7	Michael Ford	Bolton West	290
0.7	Iain Sheldon	Ceredigion	268
0.7	Winston McKenzie	Croydon North	324
0.7	Adrian Roberts	Mitcham & Moredon	286
0.6	David Harris	Cities of London & Westminster	218
0.6	Alan Eastwood	Cornwall North	324
0.6	Marianne Bowness	Croydon Central	304
0.6	David Heather	Dulwich & West Norwood	241
0.6	H Forster	Southport	238
0.5	Russell Thomas	Havant	195
0.5	Fiona Luckhurst-Matthews	Sedgefield	218
0.5	David Cassidy	Sittingbourne & Sheppey	192
0.4	David Henson	Kingston & Surbiton	200
0.3	Ian Upton	Bury North	476
0.3	Peter Gifford	Falmouth & Camborne	128
0.3	Dave Boyle	Reading West	141
0.3	Glenn Platt	Surrey South West	172
–	Total	65 constituencies	41272

=== Parliamentary by-elections ===
2005 Cheadle by-election results
Candidate	Party	Votes	%	Position
Leslie Leggett	Veritas	218	0.6	4th

=== National Assembly for Wales elections ===
2007 National Assembly for Wales election results
Candidate	Region	Votes	%	Result
Iain Sheldon	Mid and West Wales	502	0.2	Not elected

=== Local elections ===
2006 local election results
Council	Candidates	Votes
Hull	2	102
Bolton	2	288

2007 local election results
Council	Candidates	Votes
Bolton	1	74
South Bedfordshire	1	405
North Norfolk	1	59

== See also ==
- Alliance for Democracy (UK)
- English Democrats
