= Association of British Counties =

UK society

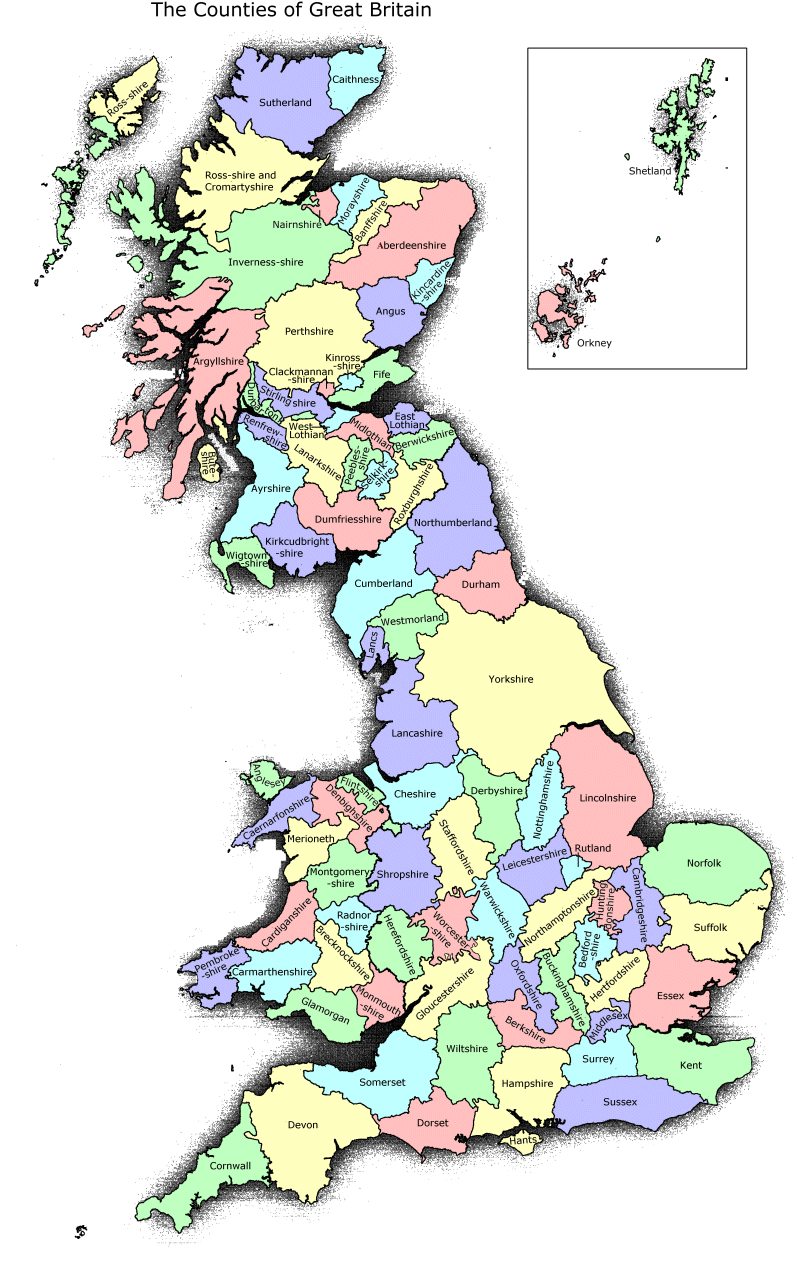
ABC map of counties, based approximately on "reputed boundaries" from first edition Ordnance Survey maps

The Association of British Counties (ABC) is a non-party-political society formed in 1989 by television personality Russell Grant to promote the historic counties of the United Kingdom. It argues that the historic counties are an important part of Britain's cultural heritage and as such should be preserved and promoted. It also proposes that there be a clear official distinction between the historic counties and the administrative units known as counties—first described as a separate entity in the Local Government Act 1888.

== Definitions and county boundaries recognised by the Association ==
The ABC recognises ninety-two historic counties of the United Kingdom; and provides a gazetteer of British place names to enable their identification. The gazetteer identifies the corresponding historic county with respect to the Counties (Detached Parts) Act 1844, in addition to cross-referencing other administrative areas.

The association maintains that "the "county corporate" status granted to some towns and cities has always been considered to be an extra civic dignity bestowed on the town/city and not to imply that these towns/cities are the equivalent of the Counties or no longer lie in their parent County".

The association declares that the "most authoritative definition of the boundaries of the Counties of Great Britain is that obtained by the Ordnance Survey during its first national survey of Great Britain".

Areas transferred from one county to another by the Counties (Detached Parts) Act 1844 are "considered to be associated with both their parent County (from which they are detached) and the County in which they locally lie."

== Aims and objectives ==
The ABC has declared that it does not want further local government reorganisation. Instead it would rather see an official distinction made between current administrative units known as counties, and those areas known as counties before the local government reforms of 1965 and 1974, which were not abolished.

It seeks to bring about an official change in government terminology to bring it in line with its interpretation of the Local Government Act 1888—the original piece of legislation which created the county councils in England and Wales, though there have since been several further changes. The Act specifically called the areas it created "administrative counties" (although it also amended what it called the "counties"), and the ABC wishes to see this terminology consistently used to describe them. Also it wishes to see the term "county" stripped from the unitary authorities that use it, a measure which it claims will remove what it sees as confusion resulted from the status of various entities termed counties since 1888. In particular, ABC uses scare quotes around the word "county" when not referring to the counties as defined by them.

Other policies include:

- compelling the Ordnance Survey to mark the historic county borders on their maps
- lobbying for the erection of boundary signs at these boundaries
- making the ceremonial counties match the boundaries of the historic counties they promote
- that the English regions should be redefined in order to ensure that the counties as they describe them should "be brought wholly within one region or another"

== Activities ==
=== Local government ===
The ABC was founded in 1989, holding its inaugural conference on 1 April in historic Monmouthshire. This was at the beginning of a period of review of local government areas: in March 1989 the Secretary of State for the Environment, Nicholas Ridley had ordered an urgent review of the future of Humberside. Later in April the MP Nicholas Bennett unsuccessfully introduced a bill into the Commons to introduce a system of unitary authorities in Wales based on historic counties. Following the establishment of the Local Government Commission for England in 1992, the ABC became active in the review process, advocating the restoration of historic county boundaries. The LGCE's review resulted in the restoration of Herefordshire and Rutland to local government and ceremonial status, and the abolition of the unpopular counties of Avon, Cleveland and Humberside. Attempts to resurrect Cumberland and Westmorland failed to gain the support of either the LGCE or the public. The creation of a Huntingdonshire unitary authority was also eventually rejected in spite of strong support locally.

In 2007 it was announced that a number of unitary authorities would be formed in 2009. Among the councils that were to gain unitary status were the county councils of Durham, Northumberland, Shropshire and Wiltshire, which were to absorb all of the district councils in each county. The ABC launched a campaign in November 2007 for the new unitary councils to be renamed to reflect what they asserted to be "real counties":

- They suggested that the new authority for County Durham should be named either "Central Durham and Teesdale" or "Mid Durham and Teesdale". The leader of Durham County Council rejected this suggestion, noting that residents of the area were proud of their county name, and that the "only redeeming feature is that it would give us one of the longest council names in the country". "Given our proud heritage and all that our area has to offer, I would hope that our county would be known for much more than that." Another member of the council suggested that if these "unelected people...want to change the name, then they should pay for it", a cost he estimated at £4 million.
- The group suggested naming the new authority for Northumberland "Northumberland Heartlands Council", "North and West Northumberland Council", "Rural Northumberland Council" or "Northumberland Moors and Coast Council". However, when the people of the county were asked to choose whether they wanted the name of the council to remain as 'Northumberland County Council' or to change to 'Northumberland Council' the outcome was to retain the old county council name.
- Suggested renamings of Shropshire Council were "Shropshire Heartlands Council", "Heart of Shropshire Council" and "Shrewsbury and Rural Shropshire Council".
- ABC suggest naming the new authority for Wiltshire "Heart of Wiltshire Council", "Wiltshire Heartlands Council", "Wiltshire Plains and Downs Council" or "Salisbury and Rural Wiltshire Council". However, the name "Wiltshire Council" had already been chosen in September 2007.

=== Addresses and signage ===
Successes for the "traditional counties movement" include:

- Successfully lobbying the Royal Mail to have historic, in addition to administrative and former postal, counties included in the Postcode Address File's Alias record, which is used to "find the correct postal addresses from ‘postally-not-required’ data".
- The erection of signs marking the historic boundary between Lancashire and the West Riding of Yorkshire on the A59.
- The erection of signs by Trafford Metropolitan Borough Council marking the historic boundary between Cheshire and Lancashire.
- The erection of signs by Oldham Metropolitan Borough Council and Saddleworth Parish Council marking the historic boundary between Yorkshire and Lancashire.

=== Parliamentary support ===
Some MPs overtly support recognition of the historic counties – notably the former Secretary of State for Communities and Local Government, Eric Pickles, who was quoted on the departmental website as saying: "The historic English counties are one of the oldest forms of local government in Western Europe. Their roots run deep. And no amount of administrative reshuffling can delete these longstanding and cherished local identities."

A private member's bill, the Historic Counties (Traffic Signs and Mapping) Bill, was twice introduced into the 2001–05 Parliament, first by John Randall in 2003, and again in 2004 by Adrian Flook, who "[paid] tribute to the Association of British Counties for trailblazing the campaign". The Bill did not proceed to second reading in either year.

Another private member's bill, the Historic Counties, Towns and Villages (Traffic Signs and Mapping) Bill, was introduced to Parliament on 31 January 2007 by Andrew Rosindell under the Ten Minute Rule. It was ordered to be brought in by a group of 12 MPs. Rosindell "[thanks] the Association of British Counties, a society dedicated to promoting awareness of the 86 historic counties of Great Britain, which has campaigned tirelessly for their recognition through proper signage denoting historic county boundaries". The bill did not proceed beyond second reading but was supported by the Conservative opposition. It was opposed by the government.

John Butcher was an active member of the group, campaigning in Parliament during the 1990s UK local government reform. In 1991, he suggested to the Secretary of State for Wales the use of the traditional county names Radnorshire, Montgomeryshire and Monmouthshire for unitary authorities in Wales In a 1996 debate, declaring he was honorary president of the ABC, he noted his approval of the abolition of the postal counties, meaning that "people who live in places like Birmingham, Walsall and Coventry can now use in their addresses the ancient pre-1974 counties".

== Commentary ==
The following statements have been made regarding the status of the historic counties (though they are not Government policy statements):

Eric Pickles MP: see above

Quoted in The Times of 1 April 1974:

According to a Department of the Environment official, the new county boundaries are solely for the purpose of defining areas of first-level government of the future: "They are administrative areas and will not alter the traditional boundaries of counties, nor is it intended that the loyalties of people living in them will change." Citing Middlesex as an example, he said that although that county had been swallowed up in Greater London in 1965 and disappeared for governmental purposes, the name still exists for postal and other reasons. "Similarly the broad acres known as Yorkshire will remain unaltered despite the different names adopted by the new administrative counties."

Paul Beresford, then Parliamentary Under-Secretary of State for the Environment, on 4 December 1995.

local government boundaries are concerned essentially with administration, and changes, whether arising from the 1974 reorganisation or as part of the current review, need not affect ancient loyalties and affinities. I need hardly name some of these. Lancashire County Cricket Club was mentioned, and continues to have Old Trafford as its main ground and headquarters, and has managed to do quite well on it in the last season, despite being within Greater Manchester.

== Affiliates ==
When the ABC first emerged it was stated to have been "formed by about 30 county groups". Among those listed at the time were the Friends of Real Lancashire, the Voice of Rutland, the Back to Somerset Campaign and the County of Middlesex Trust. Of these only the first now appears to be active.

According to their websites, the following groups are affiliated as of September 2012:

- Friends of Real Lancashire
- The Huntingdonshire Society
- The Monmouthshire Association
- The Oxfordshire Association
- The Westmorland Association
- Yorkshire Ridings Society and its local group the Saddleworth White Rose Society

== Publications ==
- The Gazetteer of British Place Names
