= Friends of Real Lancashire =

Lancastrian pressure group

- Abbreviation: FORL
- Formation: 1995
- Founder: Chris Dawson
- Purpose: Promote, protect and preserve what it views as the true identity of Lancashire
- Location: United Kingdom
- President: Andrew Gwynne MP
- Chairman: Philip Walsh
- Affiliations: Association of British Counties
- Website: forl.co.uk

Friends of Real Lancashire (FORL) is an apolitical pressure group affiliated to the Association of British Counties, calling for the wider recognition of the historic boundaries of Lancashire in England. Its chairman is Philip Walsh and its president is the former Gorton and Denton MP, Andrew Gwynne.

== Background ==
The historic borders of Lancashire.

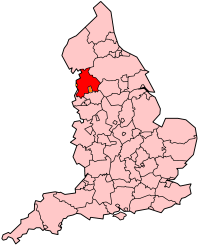
Local government Lancashire shown in red, with two unitary authorities in ceremonial Lancashire in orange.

The Friends of Real Lancashire are concerned to promote what it views as the true boundaries of the county, namely those of the County Palatine of Lancaster. The current local government boundary of the Ceremonial County of Lancashire was established in 1974 by the Local Government Act 1972. Lancashire saw more upheaval from this Act than most counties, having most of its population transferred to the new counties: Manchester and the rest of south east Lancashire became part of Greater Manchester; Liverpool and the rest of south west Lancashire became part of Merseyside; Furness became part of Cumbria; and Warrington and Widnes became part of Cheshire.

According to the FORL website, in 1974 "the Government at that time stated that the "new counties" were administrative areas only, and that the boundaries of traditional counties such as Lancashire had not been changed. Unfortunately, the media refer to these administrative areas all too frequently and ignore the fact that places such as Barrow-in-Furness, Liverpool, Manchester, Warrington, etc., are still in Lancashire."

The boundary changes were not intended to affect loyalties but they caused concern in some areas, and in practice, it is the new boundaries which are now shown on maps and marked by road signs. The historic county boundaries continue to be used as the basis for organisations such as the Duchy of Lancaster, Lancashire County Cricket Club and Lancashire County Football Association (although its area overlaps with the Liverpool and Manchester Football Associations, both of which predate their corresponding metropolitan counties).

The area under the control of Lancashire County Council, or shire county, became even smaller in 1998 when Blackpool and Blackburn with Darwen became unitary authorities. Although they remain part of the ceremonial county, they are often no longer mapped as part of Lancashire and "Welcome to Lancashire" road signs have been placed on their boundaries with the shire county.

The group counts at least nine MPs (Jake Berry, Gordon Birtwistle, Simon Danczuk, Nigel Evans, Lindsay Hoyle, John Leech, David Nuttall, John Pugh and Ben Wallace) amongst its supporters and has been mentioned in Hansard. It has received limited support within local government, and its campaign has also mentioned in the local press. Lancashire Life magazine identifies itself as an enthusiastic supporter of the group and continues to cover the historic county area.

== Aims ==
FORL has the following aims:

- The restoration of the historic boundaries of the Lancashire ceremonial county with the Lord-Lieutenant of Lancashire covering everywhere within the historic borders.
- Road signs to mark the historic boundaries with Cheshire, Yorkshire, Westmorland and Cumberland.
- The historic boundaries to be shown on Ordnance Survey and other maps rather than the current administrative boundaries.

The group also campaigns to have public bodies named in accordance with historic rather than contemporary county names e.g. NHS ambulance authority reforms. However, they do not propose any changes to administrative boundaries.

== Successes ==
FORL was central in the establishment of a county day on the 27th of November, which is now celebrated throughout the historic county and has been adopted by a wide range of organisations as well as being well recognised in the press.

In 1994 FORL raised a petition with 30,000 signatures calling "for the restoration of Lancashire's historic boundaries" – the petition requested that the "Metropolitan Counties of Merseyside, Greater Manchester and Cumbria be abolished and the real and historic county of Lancashire be restored". In response to other suggestions of restoring former boundaries, the Government has commented that although it has no plans to restore the historic borders of counties, boundary changes that have occurred need not affect loyalties.

The Local Government Commission for England made draft recommendations as part of a review of the structure of local government in Cumbria that the "areas of Barrow-in-Furness Borough Council and South Lakeland District Council formerly in Lancashire should be returned to historic Lancashire for ceremonial and related purposes". The final recommendations noted that "the Commission heard from few people on this subject during the consultation period, although support was indicated by the Friends of Real Lancashire", and consequently proposed no change.

The group succeeded in having signs erected near Clitheroe, Nelson and Colne marking the traditional border with the West Riding of Yorkshire, on roads which are currently managed by Lancashire County Council, and paid for at no expense to that body. A similar request to Cumbria County Council, to mark the historic borders between Westmorland and Cumberland and Lancashire was denied in 1996.

In 2001, the leader of the council was presented with a framed map, created by the group, depicting the historic boundaries. It was put on display at County Hall. Lancaster City Council endorsed the group's position in June 2002, resolving that the Council "support the Friends of Real Lancashire’s campaign to restore the former geographical county boundaries".

The Royal Mail no longer require the use of their former postal counties when addressing letters and instead use the postcode and post town to direct mail. As part of their flexible addressing policy, anyone may now include "Lancashire" as part of their address. Where a county is provided however, it will be ignored and to this end, an alias file supplement to the Postcode Address File cross references county and other postally-not-required information to the correct postal address.

In 2013, Secretary of State for Communities and Local Government Eric Pickles formally recognised and acknowledged the continued existence of England's 39 historic counties, including the traditional boundaries of Lancashire.

== Lancashire Day ==
As part of its campaign the group adopted 27 November as Lancashire Day, this being the day in 1295 when Lancashire sent its first representatives to Parliament. It was first celebrated in 1996 with the Loyal Toast to "The Queen, Duke of Lancaster". Lancashire Day paralleled the similar Yorkshire Day, first held in 1975.

Lancashire Day has been widely publicised, including mentions on the BBC website. It has received support from district councils, the county council as well as from organisations throughout the historic county of Lancashire.

As part of their curation of Lancashire Day, Friends of Real Lancashire hold an annual awards called "The Lancastrian Awards" with winners being categorised by Lancashire's historic hundreds and announced throughout Lancashire Day

== See also ==
- CountyWatch
